= One leu (Romanian coin) =

Romanian coin

- Romania
- Value: 1.00 Romanian leu
- Mass: 2.5 g
- Diameter: 19.00 mm
- Edge: Plain
- Composition: Copper-plated steel
- Years of minting: 1870, 1873–1874, 1876, 1881, 1884–1885, 1894, 1900–1901, 1906, 1910–1912, 1914, 1924, 1938–1941, 1992–1996

Obverse
- Design: Coat of arms of Romania with date split across
- Designer: Vasile Gabor
- Design date: 1993

Reverse
- Design: Country name at top, denomination in middle, wheat sheafs on each side
- Designer: Vasile Gabor
- Design date: 1993

The one leu coin was a coin of the Romanian leu. Introduced in 1870, it last circulated between 1992 and de facto 1996, when it was the lowest-denomination coin in the country. It was considered as circulating coin for accounting reasons and was still minted in proof sets until the 2005 denomination of the currency.

In addition to Romania, the coin was minted in Belgium, Austria, France and Hungary.

== History ==
=== Principality of Romania ===
Although the first Romanian coins were minted in the United Kingdom in 1867, a one leu coin was not introduced until 1870. The first one leu coin was 83.5% silver and 16.5% copper, with a diameter of 23mm and mass of 5g. The obverse bore the portrait of Carol I of Romania facing left with the inscription CAROL I DOMNUL ROMANIEI (Carol I Prince of the Romanians). The reverse, similar to other Romanian coins of the time, featured the denomination and year of minting within a wreath of laurel and oak. Below the wreath, where the British mintmarks had been on previous coins, was the initial 'C', for C.J. Cândescu, the director of the Bucharest mint. There were also coins bearing the 'B' mintmark of the mint itself. Production of the one leu coin began on 24 February 1870 and throughout the year a total of 400,000 were minted, some in coin orientation and some in medallic orientation.

A second one leu coin was introduced in 1873, retaining the composition and dimensions of the 1870 issue. On the obverse, the portrait was replaced with the full coat of arms of the Principality of Romania with the year below. The name of the engraver, STERN, and the mintmark of Saint Michael of Brussels were either side of the date. On the reverse, the wreath was shortened to include the name of the country at the top of the coin. There were coins struck in 1873 where the 'L' in 'LEU' was broken. The coin was minted in Brussels, Belgium, in 1873, 1874 and 1876 with the following mintages:

- 1873: 4,443,393
- 1874: 4,511,607
- 1876: 225,000

In 1881 a new coin was minted with the same dimensions and composition. On the obverse, the portrait of Carol I returned with the same inscription as in 1870, and with the engraver's name KULLRICH beneath. The full coat of arms moved to the reverse, with the country name on top and the denomination split either side. The year of minting was placed beneath the coat of arms, with the 'V' mintmark for Vienna, Austria on the left and the wheat ear for the Bucharest mint in Romania on the right. There was a total mintage of 1.8 million coins, with some bearing a 'B' mintmark for Bucharest in place of the 'V'.

=== Kingdom of Romania ===
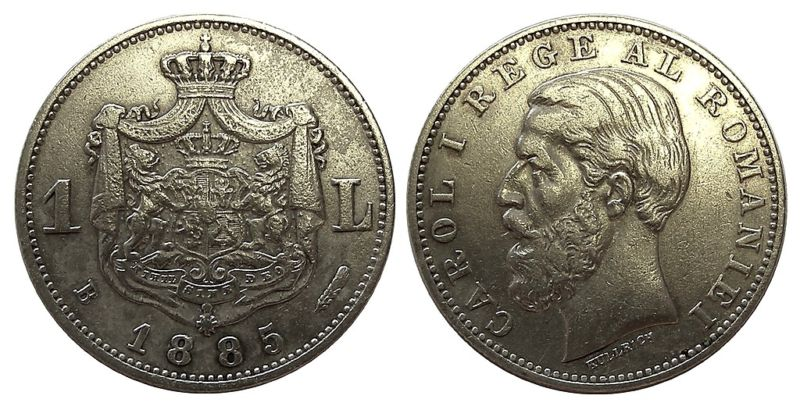
Both sides of an 1885 one leu coin bearing the portrait of King Carol I of Romania on the obverse

In 1884, due to the creation of the Kingdom of Romania in 1881, the script around Carol I read CAROL I REGE AL ROMANIEI (Carol I King of Romania). The name of the country was removed from the top of the reverse, and all coins bore the 'B' mintmark of Bucharest. The specifications remained the same. The initial year of production, 1884, saw a mintage of one million coins, with 400,000 in the next year.

Production of one leu coins resumed in 1894 with 1.5 million minted in Brussels. On the obverse, the portrait of Carol I was changed to a new version, with the engraver's name A. SCHARFF underneath. The country name returned to the top of the reverse. After 1894 the coin was not minted until 1900, in Hamburg, Germany, with 798,800 in 1900 and 369,614 in 1901.

In 1906, 2.5 million one leu coins were struck to mark the 40th Anniversary of the reign of Carol I. The obverse bore a portrait of him in 1906, with the inscription CAROL I REGE AL ROMANIEI and '1866–1906' circling him. Beneath the portrait were the initials 'A.M.' for Alphonse Michaux, the chief engraver of the Brussels mint. The reverse featured a portrait of Carol I in 1866 with the inscription CAROL I DOMNUL ROMANIEI and underneath, the engraver mark A. MICHAUX and the denomination.

The one leu coin design changed in 1910. On the obverse, the title was split either side of Carol I with the engraver's name, TASSET underneath. On the obverse was a woman walking, with the country name in the top left corner, the denomination in the top right, the year in the bottom right and the engraver's name (Costache) BASSARAB in the bottom left. The reverse design was similar to that of the French one franc coin, as both countries were in the Latin Monetary Union. The coins were minted in Brussels and Hamburg, with the Brussels coins having 106 reeds on the edge compared to 102 from Hamburg. Mintage continued up to 1914 with none minted for 1913.

The next one leu coins were minted in 1924, and the specifications changed. The diameter was reduced to 21mm, and the composition to 75% copper and 25% nickel, which reduced the mass to 3.5g. The obverse bore the coat of arms with the country name above and year below, with three stars to each side. The reverse had a wreath of wheat at the bottom, with the denomination as BUN PENTRU (good for) 1 leu. One million coins were minted in Brussels and 1,007,255 in Poissy, France. The Brussels coins had no distinguishing mark but the coins from Poissy bore a lightning mark under the denomination.

In 1938 the design was altered again to an 18mm diameter and mass of 2.75g, with a composition of 80% copper, 19% zinc and 1% nickel. On the obverse, the crown of Romania was in the centre with the country name above. Below was the year and a wreath of laurel and oak. The reverse had the denomination split either side of a corn cob, with the engraver's name I. Jalea underneath. A total of 36 million were issued in 1938 and production continued every year until 1941.

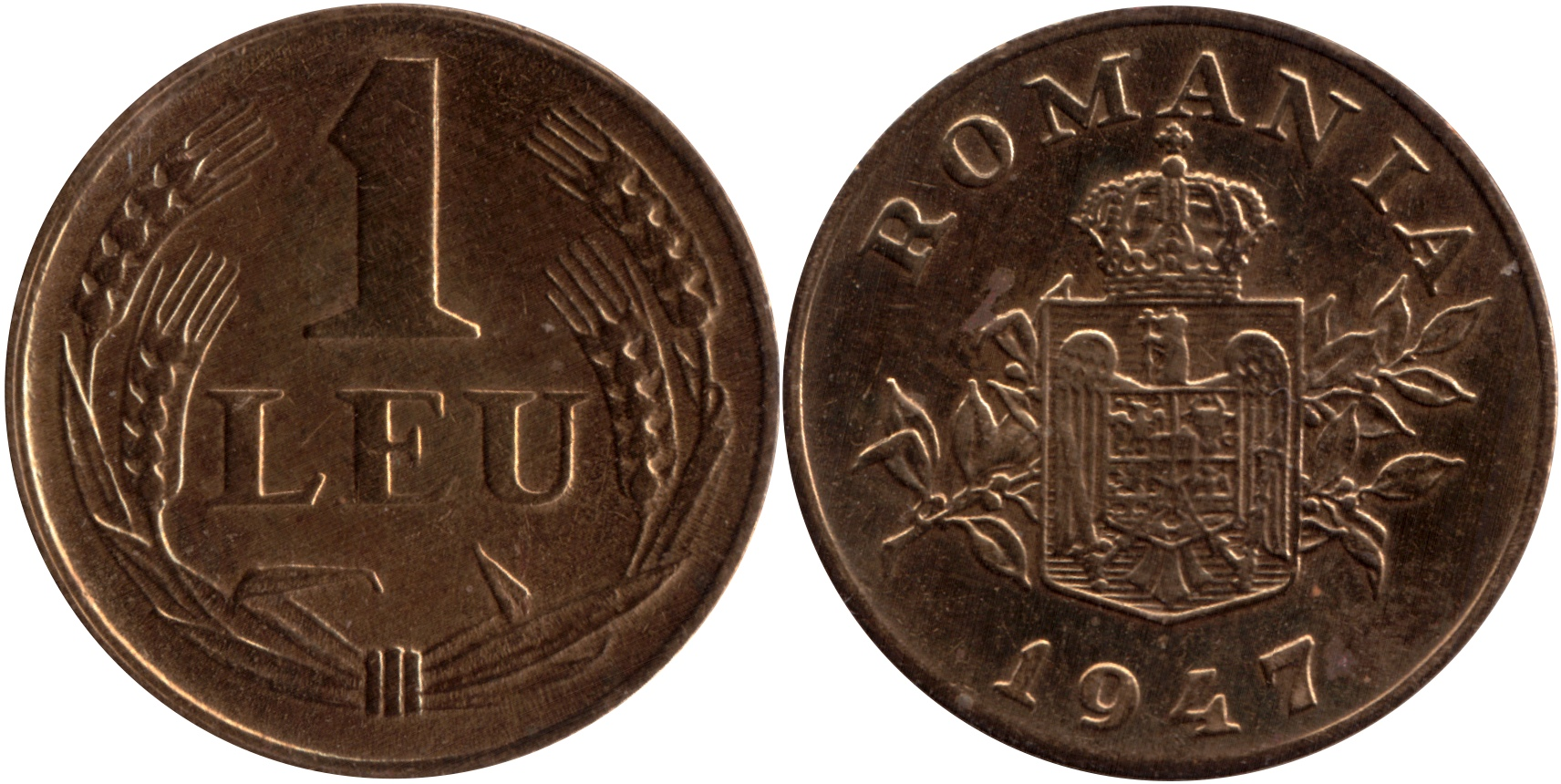
1 leu coin from 1947

The leu coin was re-introduced in 1947. It had the same diameter as the last one leu coin, but due to a new composition of 63% copper and 37% zinc, its weight fell to 2.5g. The obverse featured the new state arms with country name above and year below, and the reverse had the denomination between sheafs of wheat. A total of around 90 million of these coins were minted, between the Romanian capital Bucharest and the Hungarian capital Budapest.

=== Romanian People's Republic ===
After People's Republic of Romania was proclaimed on 30 December 1947, an entirely new coin was minted ]n 1949, with a 16mm diameter and 1.83g weight. Composed of 70% copper and 30% zinc, it was minted each year until 1951. The obverse featured an oil rig and a sunrise behind it, with the country's official name circling it. The engraver's name, H. IONESCU, was written below. The reverse was simpler, with the denomination and date in the centre.

A new coin with the same design as the 1949–1951 issue was introduced in 1951 and minted until 1952. It was aluminium made and therefore weighed 0.61g.

All the three coins from 1947 to 1952 were legal tender until the monetary reform on 28 January 1952.

In 1963 a new one leu coin was minted, with a 24mm diameter and weight of 5.06 g due to its composition of 5% nickel core and 95% steel plating. The obverse featured a new version of the state arms with the country's official name circling it, and the date underneath. The reverse had the denomination and a scene of agriculture, sunrise and oil rigs. Despite all of the coins bearing the date 1963, a total of 79,100,000 were minted from 1963 to 1965.

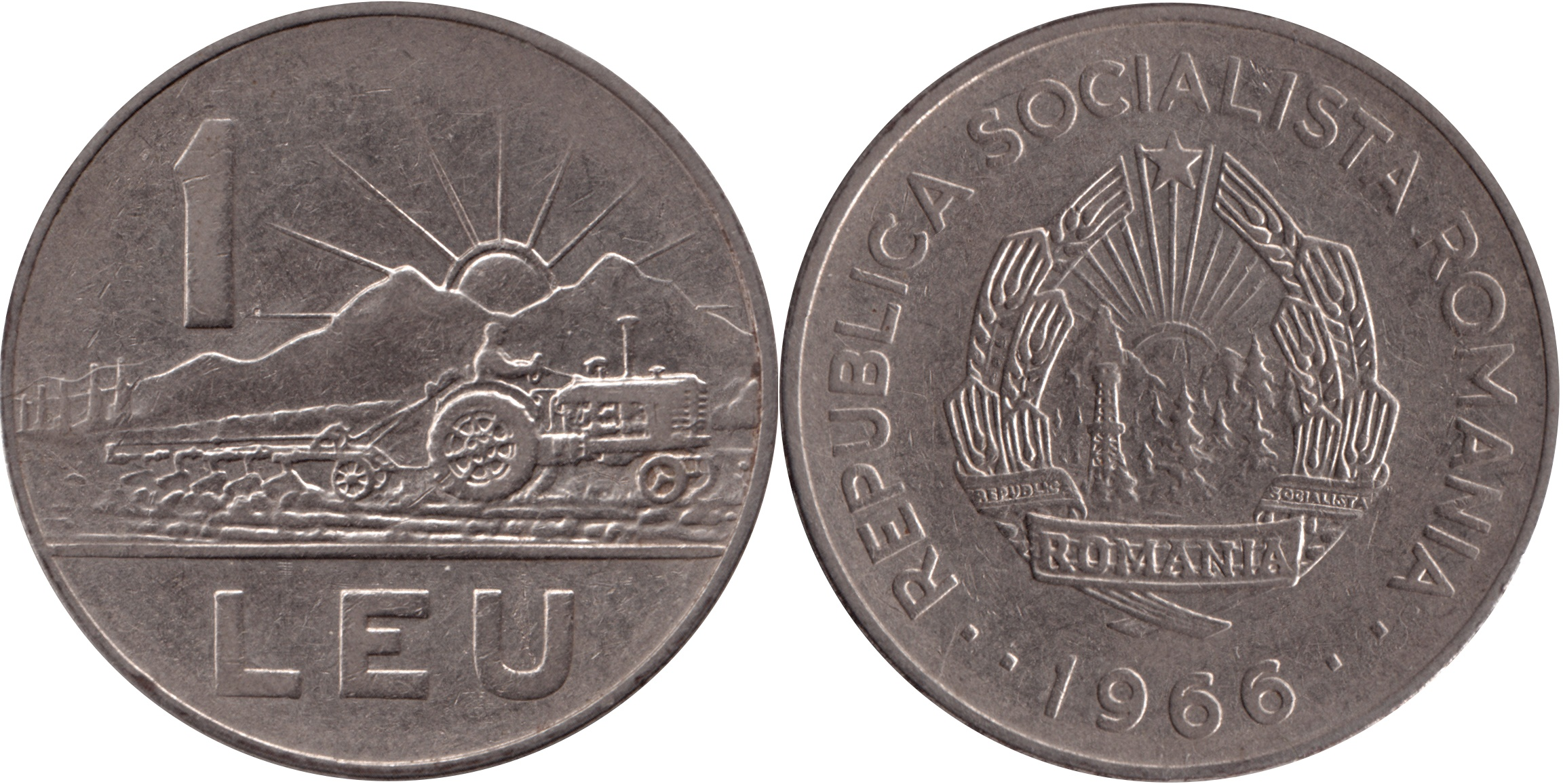
1 leu coin from 1966

The new Socialist Republic of Romania minted a one leu coin identical to the last one from the People's Republic, changing only the name of the country on the obverse. Although all of these coins were dated 1966, a total of 75,437,000 were minted until 1969.

=== After the Romanian revolution ===
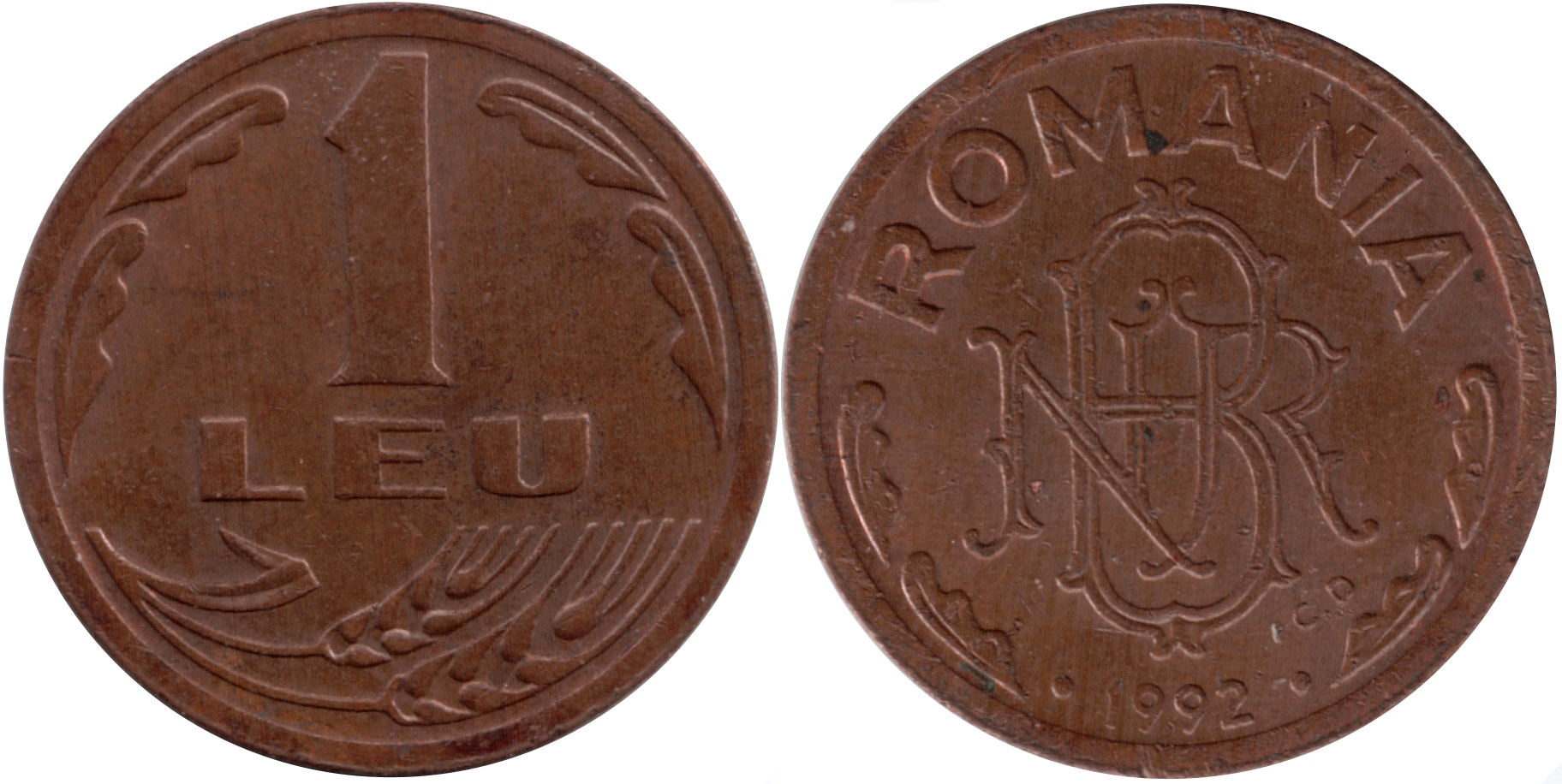
1 leu coin from 1992

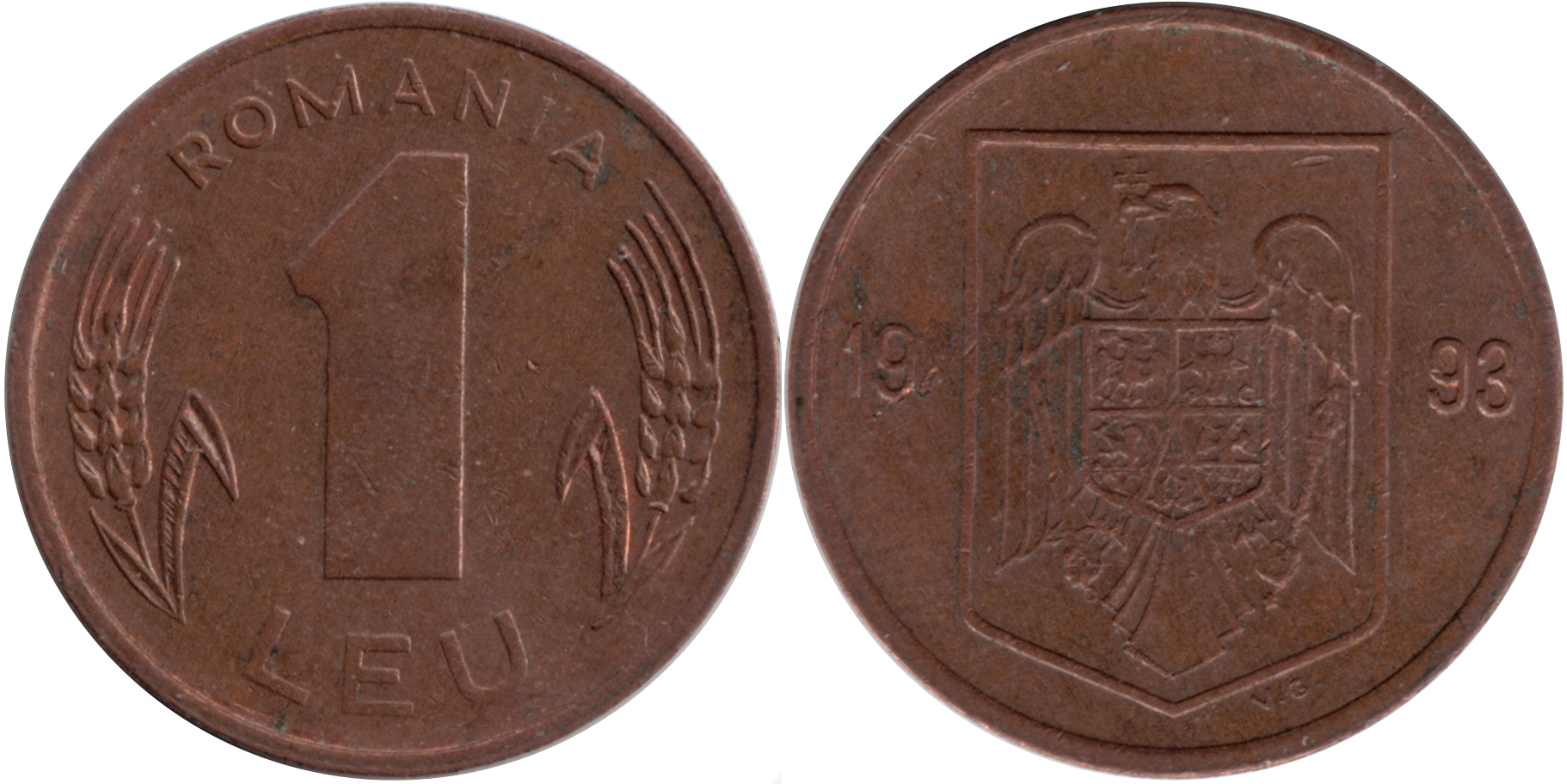
1 leu coin from 1993

Post-communist Romania issued a one leu coin on 25 November 1992, with a total mintage of 60 million. It had a diameter of 16mm, weight of 2.5g and was composed of copper-plated steel. The obverse had the National Bank of Romania's monogram in the centre, surrounded by oak leaves with the country name at the top and year at the bottom. The reverse had the denomination surrounded by oak leaves and wheat sheafs.

On 28 May 1993, in parallel with the 1992 issue, a new 1 leu coin was introduced with the same dimensions and specifications as the 1992 issue. The obverse featured the coat of arms of Romania, with the date of issue divided on either side of the coat of arms. The engraver's initials, V.G., from Vasile Gabor, were placed at the bottom, to the right of the coat of arms. The reverse featured the face value, 1 LEU, with ears of wheat on its sides and the name of the country, ROMANIA, at the top.

It was issued between 1993 and 1996 and had a circulation of 61,000,000 pieces in 1993, 10,000,000 pieces in 1994, 2,000,000 pieces in 1995 and 272,000 pieces in 1996.

Since the fall of communism and the reform of the currency in 2005, with 10000 old Lei becoming one new Leu, no one Leu coins have been issued for general circulation; a small bank note is used, with 50 Bani being the highest value coin in circulation.
