= Vreneli =

Gold coins

- Switzerland
- Value: Swiss franc
- Edge: minted
- Composition: .900 gold
- Years of minting: 1897–1936, 1947, 1949

Obverse
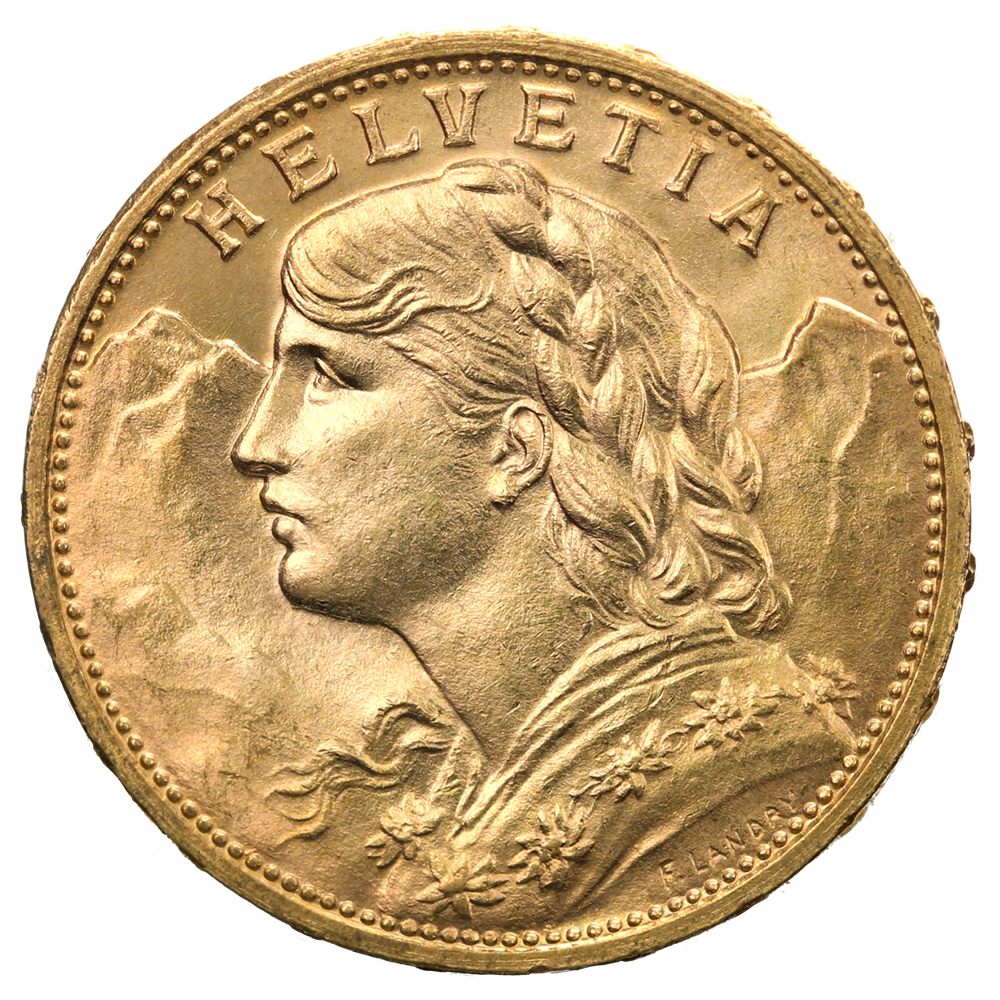
- Design: Helvetia

Reverse
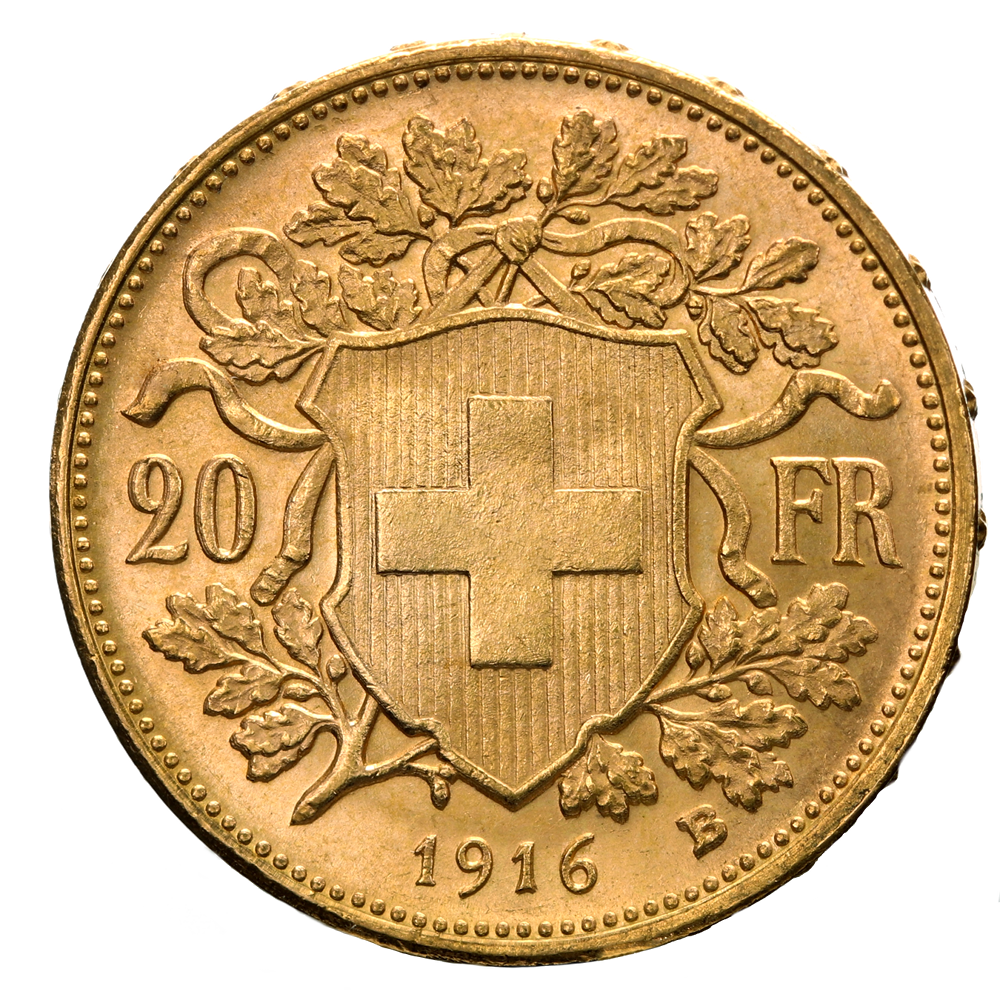
- Design: Coat of arms of Switzerland
- Designer: Fritz Ulysse Landry
- Design date: 1895

Vreneli (aka Goldvreneli) is the informal name for a range of legal tender gold coins of the Swiss franc. The coins were issued between 1897 and 1936, in 1947 and in 1949. All coins issued after 1936 are restrikes (legal tender ceased September 29, 1936).

The coin exists in three denominations, of 10, 20 and 100 francs. The 20 franc coin was produced from 1897 to 1949 with a total issue of 58.6 million pieces. It replaced an earlier design of gold coin minted from 1883 to 1896. The 10 franc version was minted from 1911 to 1922 (total issue 2.6 million pieces), and the 100 franc version was minted in 1925 only (total issue 5,000 pieces). All coins have a purity of 900 ‰ gold and were minted to the standards of the Latin Monetary Union.

The name Vreneli was given to the design of a female head in profile by Neuchâtel medalist Fritz Ulysse Landry. A more formal name is Helvetia Head (German Helvetiakopf, French Tête d'Helvetia, as opposed to the Seated Helvetia (Sitzende Helvetia, Helvetia assise) or the Standing Helvetia).

== Description ==
These coins had face values of 10, 20 and 100 Swiss francs and were minted in a millesimal fineness of 900. The coins are sometimes colloquially called “Swiss Miss” from the obvious obverse motif. The 20 franc coin's reverse shows the Swiss shield, featuring the Swiss Cross, and a wreath of oak along with the denomination. The coins were minted at the Swiss Mint at Bern (although the die engraving was done at the Paris mint) and the coins are mint marked with a "B" (without a period). The 20 franc coins are 21 mm in diameter (about the size of a U.S. five cent piece), 1.3 mm in thickness, weigh 6.45 grams (gross weight) and, at 900 ‰ pure, contain .1866 troy ounces or 5.805 grams of pure gold. The 10 franc coin weighs 3.23 grams and at 900 ‰ purity contains 2.9 grams (0.093 troy ounces) of pure gold.

Swiss Mint Marks post-1848
| Letter | City | Letter | City | Letter | City |
|---|---|---|---|---|---|
| B | Bern | B. | Brussels | BB | Strasbourg |
| AB | Strasbourg | A | Paris | L | lingot/bullion re-strikes |

== Key mintage figures ==
Around 61 million coins were minted, although only 5,000 of the 100 franc pieces were produced and only in the year 1925. The 20 Franc coin is the most common, and it is popular as a bullion coin.

=== 1926 - 20 francs ===
Among the 20 franc pieces, the 1926 coin with its mintage of only 50,000 pieces is the ostensible key to that series. However, the 1926 is relatively fairly common and the real keys to the series are said to be the 1903 and the 1904. This is based upon the fact that the major coin grading services have graded less than 10 coins of each date in all grades, while the 1926 has a graded population of over 200. Of course, populations depend upon the numbers of coins actually submitted by collectors which is inexorable tied to the popularity of a coin series, or lack thereof among collectors. For a critique of population reports see Doug Winter's essay, February 2002.

=== 1925 - 100 francs ===
The 100 franc denomination was only struck in 1925 with a very limited mintage of 5,000.

=== The 10-franc series ===
The 10 franc denomination was struck in 1911 (100,000) through 1916 (130,000), inclusive, and in 1922 (1,020,000). Although the obverse is the same for the 10, 20 and 100 franc pieces, the reverse of the 10 and 100 are common depicting a radiant Swiss Cross above a branch.

=== The re-strikes of 1935 ===
In 1935, 175,000 regular strikes of the 20 franc coins were produced. However, an additional twenty million (20,008,813) coins dated "L1935B" with the "L" indicating "lingot" or bullion and the "B" indicating the Bern mint, were re-struck in 1945 (3,500,000), 1946 (7,108,813) and 1947 (9,400,000). An additional 9,200,000 coins contemporaneously struck and dated in 1947 were also produced and are distinguished by the mint mark "B". There were no regular strikes produced in the years 1945 and 1946.

== History ==
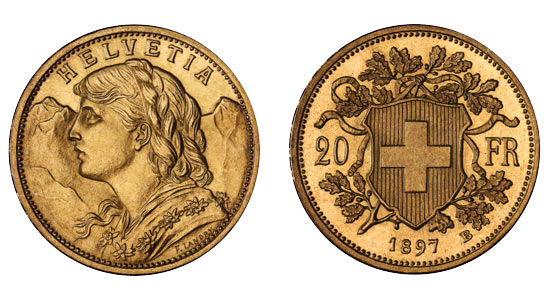
Switzerland AV 20 Francs. Bern mint. Dated 1897.

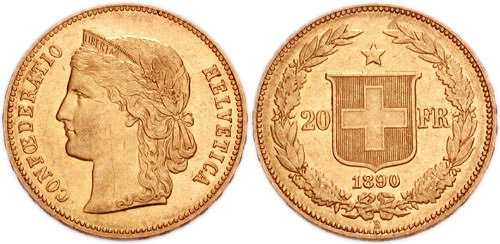
Switzerland AV 20 Francs (21mm, 6.45 g, 6h). Bern mint. Dated 1890.

The 20 francs gold coin was introduced in 1883, in the same design as the 5 francs coin at the time (with the Liberty head by Albert Walch, facing left, on the obverse, and a coat of arms designed by Albert Walch on the reverse). The "head of Liberty" design is often also identified as "Helvetia".

The 20 franc denomination with the aforementioned specifications (size and alloy and gold content) was first established by Napoleon for France in 1803. The denomination/specifications remained in usage until the First World War under what was known as the Latin Monetary League. Switzerland constituted itself in Confederation in 1848. It adopted the Swiss Franc, and aligned its currency on the French franc in 1850. It joined the Latin Union in December 1865. Switzerland had Swiss 20 franc pieces, Spain had 20 peseta coins, Italy had 20 lira pieces, Belgium had 20 Belgian franc coins, Romania had 20 lei coins and Greece had 20 drachmas coins all of which circulated and were accepted throughout Europe. For political reasons the British and the German Empires decided not to follow this direction. Attempts were even taken to explore the unification of the European currency with the American dollar, which explains the extremely rare U.S. Stella carrying an unusual face value of $4, which contained the same amount of gold as the Swiss 20 francs coins.

In 1895, the Federal Council decided that the coin should be made with a novel design. From a total of 21 suggestions, a depiction of Helvetia by Neuchâtel artist Fritz Ulysse Landry (1842–1927) won second place. His Helvetia figure was criticized as too young and romantic, and the alpine panorama as too intrusive. Landry revisited his design and the revised design was chosen for the coin. It shows a female head with tresses in profile, with a garland of edelweiss and an alpine panorama. Landry in a letterof 1895 mentions that he modelled the design on a "very pure type of women of Hasli" (the Oberhasli district of the Bernese Oberland). Suggestions for the identity of his model include and Rosa Tännler (at the time aged 17), or Françoise Kramer-Egli (at the time aged 36).

A trial run of only 12 pieces shows the head with an additional forelock which was removed as "too frivolous". The final design was still criticized as still too frivolous for a national representation, but at the same time it was widely popular and given the endearing nickname of Vreneli. The new series was authorized by the law on January 6, 1896.

The name of the coin is a Swiss German affectionate diminutive of the female given name "Verena". This name, in its diminutive form also used as a pars pro toto for female youths, is historically well-known and traditionally popular in Switzerland.

A 2011 article in Neue Zürcher Zeitung reported that part of the gold used for the coinage of Vrenelis originated from the Peruvian Madre de Dios region. The article drew a connection to the current environmental damage and health issues for the miners reported from the gold mines in the region.

== See also ==
- Coins of the Swiss franc
- Napoleon (coin)
- Rappen
