= Heinrich Ursprung =

Swiss biologist and scientific director (1932–2024)

- Born: Heinrich Klaus Peter Ursprung; 13 March 1932; Bad Zurzach, Switzerland
- Died: 17 February 2024 (aged 91)
- Education: University of Zurich
- Occupations: Biologist; Scientific director

Heinrich Klaus Peter Ursprung (13 March 1932 – 17 February 2024) was a Swiss biologist and scientific director. He was president of ETH Zurich and of ETH Domain and served as Secretary of State for Education, Research, and Innovation.

== Biography ==
Born in Bad Zurzach on 13 March 1932, Ursprung graduated from the Old Cantonal School Aarau in 1952 and from the University of Zurich in 1956. He lived in the United States from 1961 to 1969 and was an assistant researcher and adjunct professor at Johns Hopkins University. In 1969, he became a professor of zoology at ETH Zurich and served as the university's president from 1973 to 1987. From 1987 to 1990, he was president of the Schweizerischen Schulrates. In 1992, he was placed in charge of the State Secretariat for Education, Research, and Innovation under the umbrella of the Federal Department of Home Affairs.

Heinrich Ursprung died on 17 February 2024, at the age of 91.

== Honors ==
- Member of the Imperial College, London
- Honorary doctorate from the Technion – Israel Institute of Technology
- Honorary doctorate from Lund University
- Honorary member of the Swiss Academy of Engineering Sciences
- Winner of the Wilhelm Exner Medal (1996)
- Grand Star of the Decoration of Honour for Services to the Republic of Austria (1999)
