= Swiss Miss (disambiguation) =

Swiss Miss is a brand of ConAgra Foods, Inc.

Swiss Miss may also refer to:

- Heidi, an 1880 fictional orphaned Swiss girl
- Helvetia, the female personification of Switzerland
- Swiss Miss (film), a 1938 film starring Laurel and Hardy
- "Swiss Miss", a villain from Spider-Man: Turn Off the Dark
- Martina Hingis (born 1980), retired professional tennis player from Switzerland
- Vreneli, nickname for a range of legal tender gold coins produced in Switzerland
- An episode of the animated TV series Archer
- A musical composition by George Gershwin
