= Verena of Zurzach =

Egyptian virgin saint, hermit

Saint Verena of Zurzach
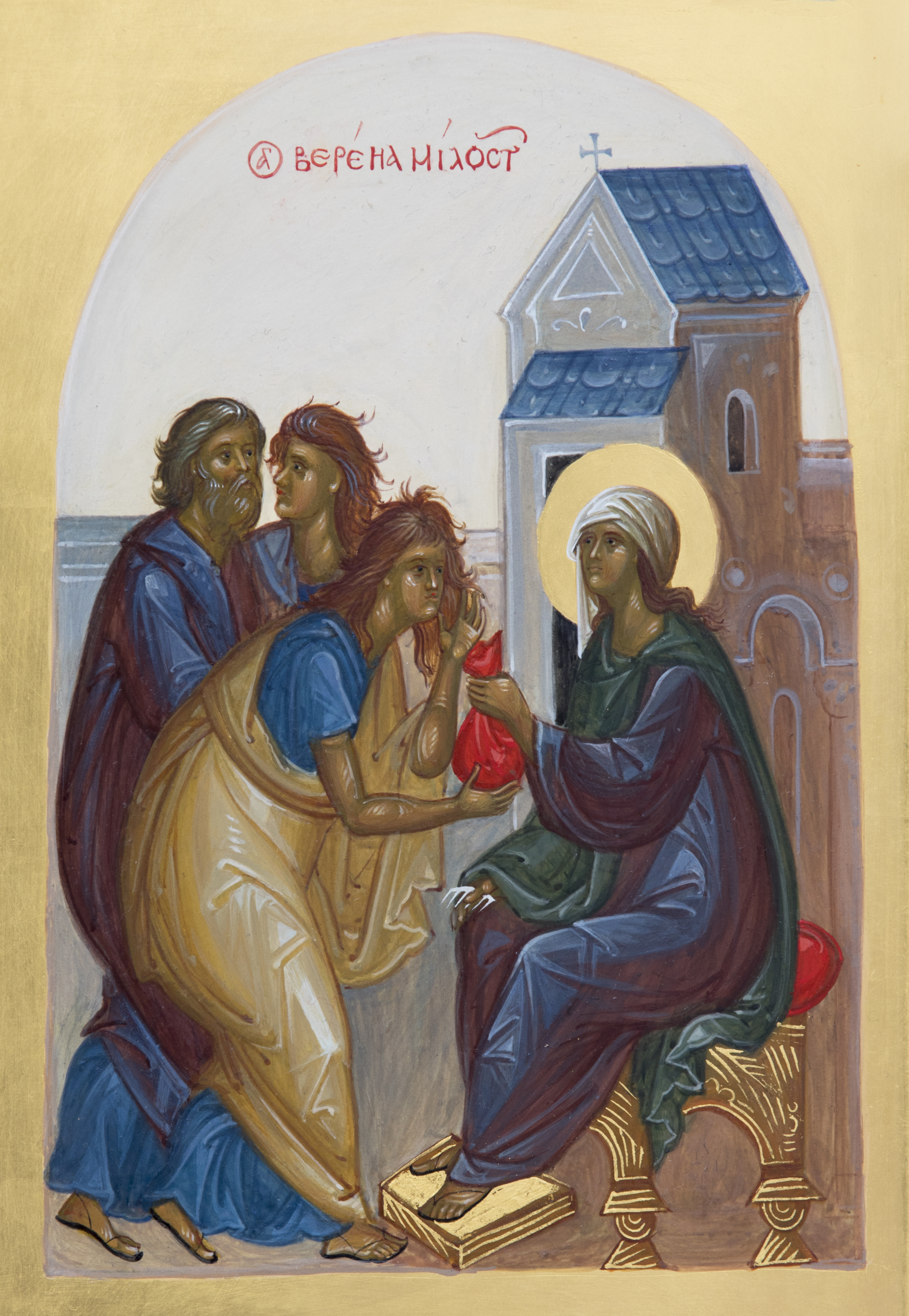
- A contemporary Russian Orthodox icon of St. Verena (right)

Virgin
- Born: 3rd century Thebes, Egypt
- Died: 344; Bad Zurzach, Switzerland
- Venerated in: Eastern Orthodox Church; Roman Catholic Church; Oriental Orthodox Churches
- Canonized: Pre-Congregation
- Major shrine: Bad Zurzach, Verena Gorge Hermitage
- Feast: 1 September (Eastern Orthodox and Roman Catholic); 4 Thout (Coptic)
- Attributes: jar and bread, comb
- Patronage: virgins, sick and lepers, nurses, fishermen, housekeepers, millers, mariners

Verena of Zurzach, also known as Saint Verena (c. 260 – c. 344), was an Egyptian early Christian consecrated virgin and hermit. She is venerated as a saint in the Eastern Orthodox Church, Roman Catholic Church and Oriental Orthodox Churches. She is especially venerated in Switzerland, where her cult is attested in Bad Zurzach, the reported place of her burial, from at least the 5th century. Her feast is on 1 September.

== Legend ==
The oldest tradition of the life of Verena is found in the so-called Vita prior by Hatto, the abbot of Reichenau (and later bishop of Mainz), written in c. 888. The younger Vita posterior was most likely written by a monk in Zurzach in the 11th century, the oldest extant copy dating to the 12th century.

According to Hatto's account, Verena was born in Thebes as the daughter of a notable Christian family. She was educated by a bishop named Chaeremon (Vita prior, ch. 3). A bishop Chaeremon of Nilopolis is mentioned by Eusebius as martyred in 250, which would place Verena's birth before that date.

After the death of Chaeremon, Verena travelled to Lower Egypt with a group of Christians, where the Theban Legion was being recruited. With the Theban Legion, she then travelled to Milan (Vita prior ch. 4). While still in Milan, she heard of the martyrdom of the Theban Legion (an event of uncertain historicity, traditionally dated to 286, during the reign of Maximian) and travelled to Agaunum (Saint-Maurice). In later sources, she is said to have buried the martyred legionnaires.

Verena then moved on to Salodurum (Solothurn) in a hermitage, and spent her days in fasting and prayer, and working miracles. Hatto presents her as a prototype of the consecrated virgin, saying that she attracted a following of young virgins. She was at one point imprisoned by a local governor, and Saint Maurice appeared to her in jail to console and strengthen her. After she was released, she continued her good works. At the end of her natural days, she retired into a narrow cave.

The year of her death was calculated as 344 by Johannes Laurentius Huber (1812–1879), provost at Verenamünster in Zurzach. If her birth before 250 is accepted (based on the identification of her mentor, bishop Chaeremon), this would imply that she was more than 95 years old at the time of her death.

== Veneration ==
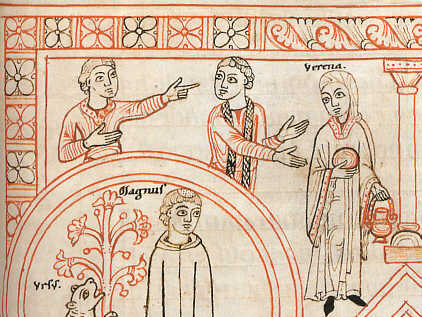
12th-century miniature from the Zwiefalter Chorbuch, showing Verena holding a jar and a plate

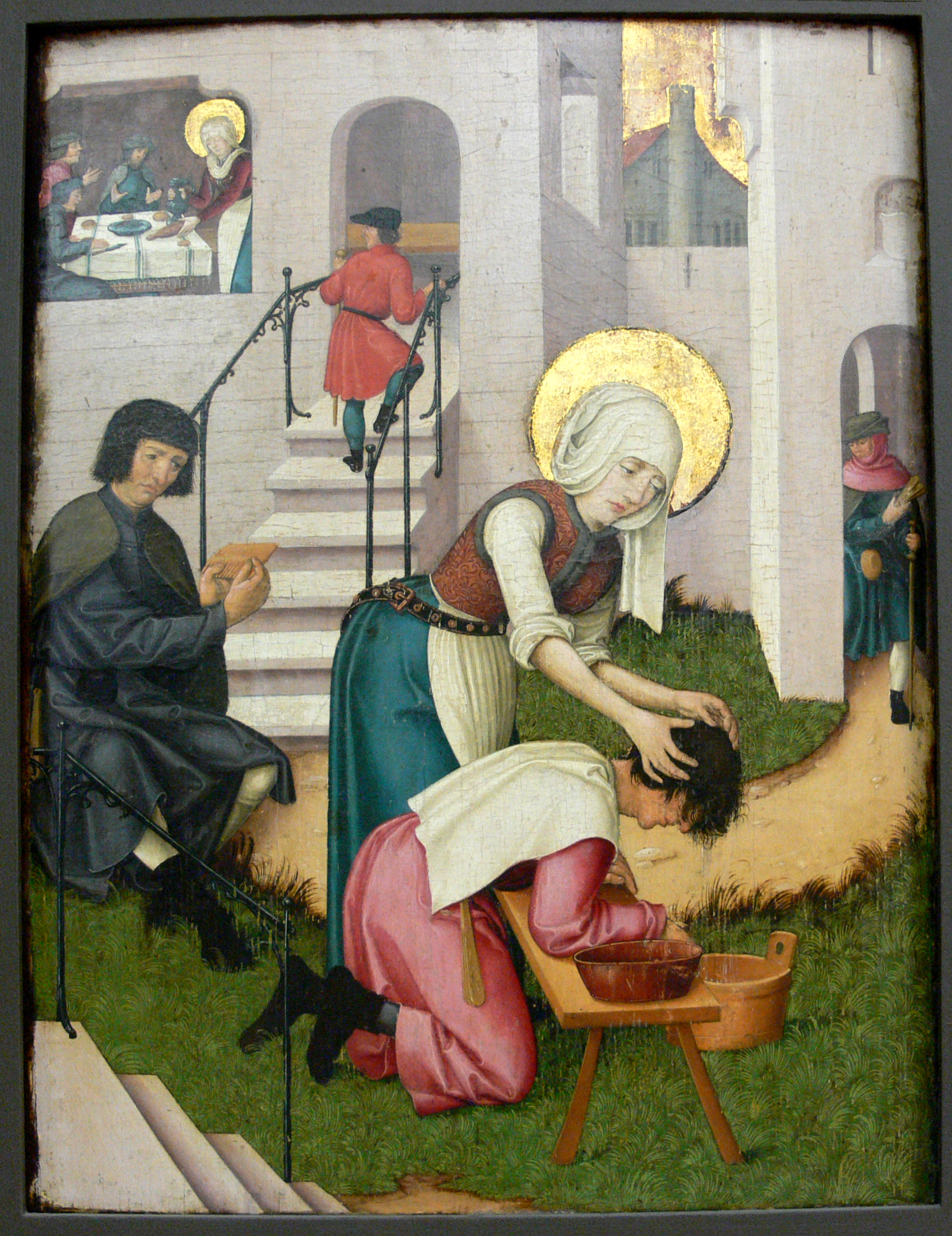
St. Verena's Mercy, Verena washing a leper's hair (Swabia, c. 1525).

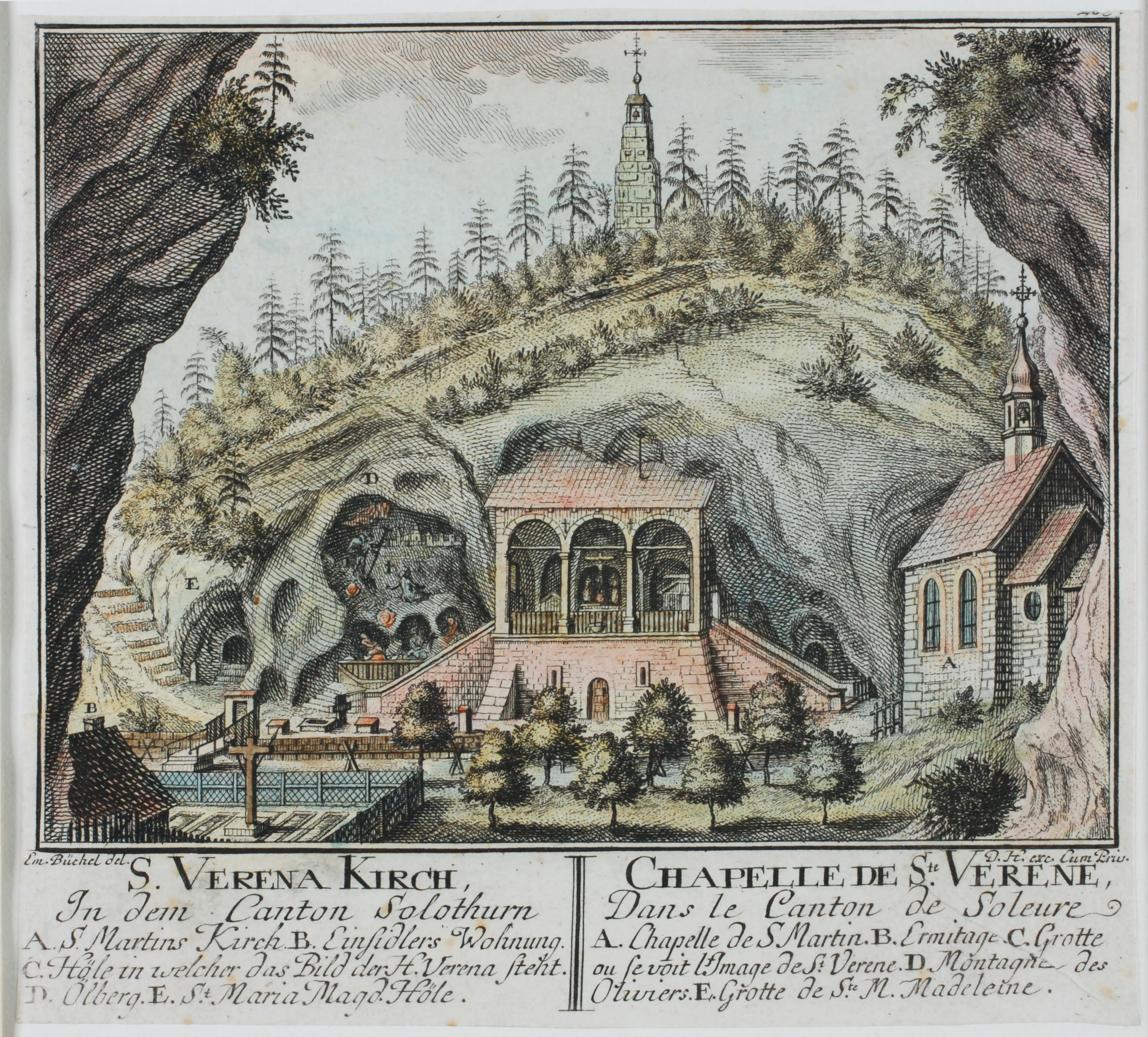
Hermitage near Solothurn, where she is said to have resided.

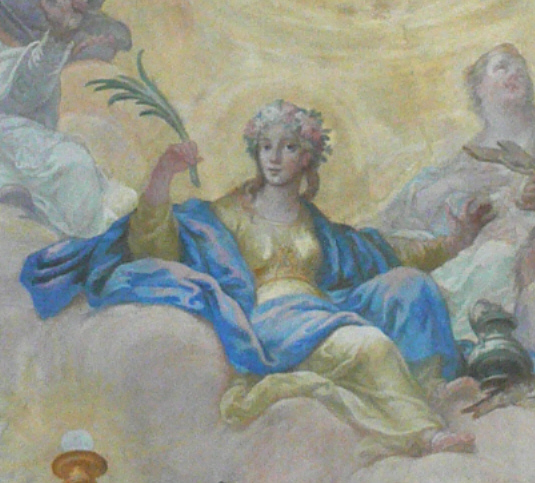
An 18th-century depiction in Bad Wurzach parish church. Verena among other saints in celestial glory. She is depicted with her common attribute, the jar (placed at her feet), and a palm branch as a symbol of victory over the flesh.

The Verena Minster in Zurzach was built over the grave of Saint Verena in a Roman cemetery.

Her cult became widespread from the 12th century, and Verena was one of the most venerated saints in medieval Switzerland. A Benedictine abbey existed in the 10th century at the site of her burial in Bad Zurzach. The monastery was replaced by a collegiate church at some time before 1265, with Saint Verena as its patroness. In southern Germany, a chapel dedicated to her was present at the site of the minster of Salem Abbey in 1137. The minster there includes a niche dedicated to her. The convent of beguines in Zürich, established in the mid-13th century, had a chapel dedicated to St. Verena.

Verena is often portrayed as a matron with either bread, or a jar of water in one hand, and a comb in the other, symbols of her care for the poor and lepers.

The given name Verena is not recorded outside of the context of this saint; it has been associated with the name Berenice (i.e. Veronica). In reference to the saint, Verena came to be a commonly given feminine name in Switzerland, in hypocoristic form [Vreni" becoming an almost archetypically Swiss girls' name (cf. diminutive "Vreneli"). The name Verena or Vreneli was also transferred to numerous female figures in Swiss folklore and mythology; notable among these are the Vrenelisgärtli ("Verena's garden") glacier of the Glärnisch massif and the main character of the folk song "Vreneli ab em Guggisberg".

The Verena Gorge Hermitage north of Solothurn, ostensibly the site of Verena's hermitage, is known to have been in existence since the 12th century (the older of the two chapels has foundations of the 12th century). The presence of a resident hermit is recorded for 1442. The site features Stations of the Cross dating from 1613 (restored around 1990). In the 18th century, the gorge was developed as a landscape garden in the style of Romanticism, notably due to the advocacy of French diplomat Louis Auguste Le Tonnelier de Breteuil. During 1810–1813, the footpath along the gorge was further developed as a partly Roman Catholic pilgrimage site, and a partly national romantic shrine for the patriciate of Solothurn. In a century-old tradition, the resident hermit is provided for by the Bürgergemeinde of the city of Solothurn.

The municipality of Stäfa at Lake Zürich displays Verena in its coat of arms, from the coat of arms of Stäfa bailiwick in use since 1526.

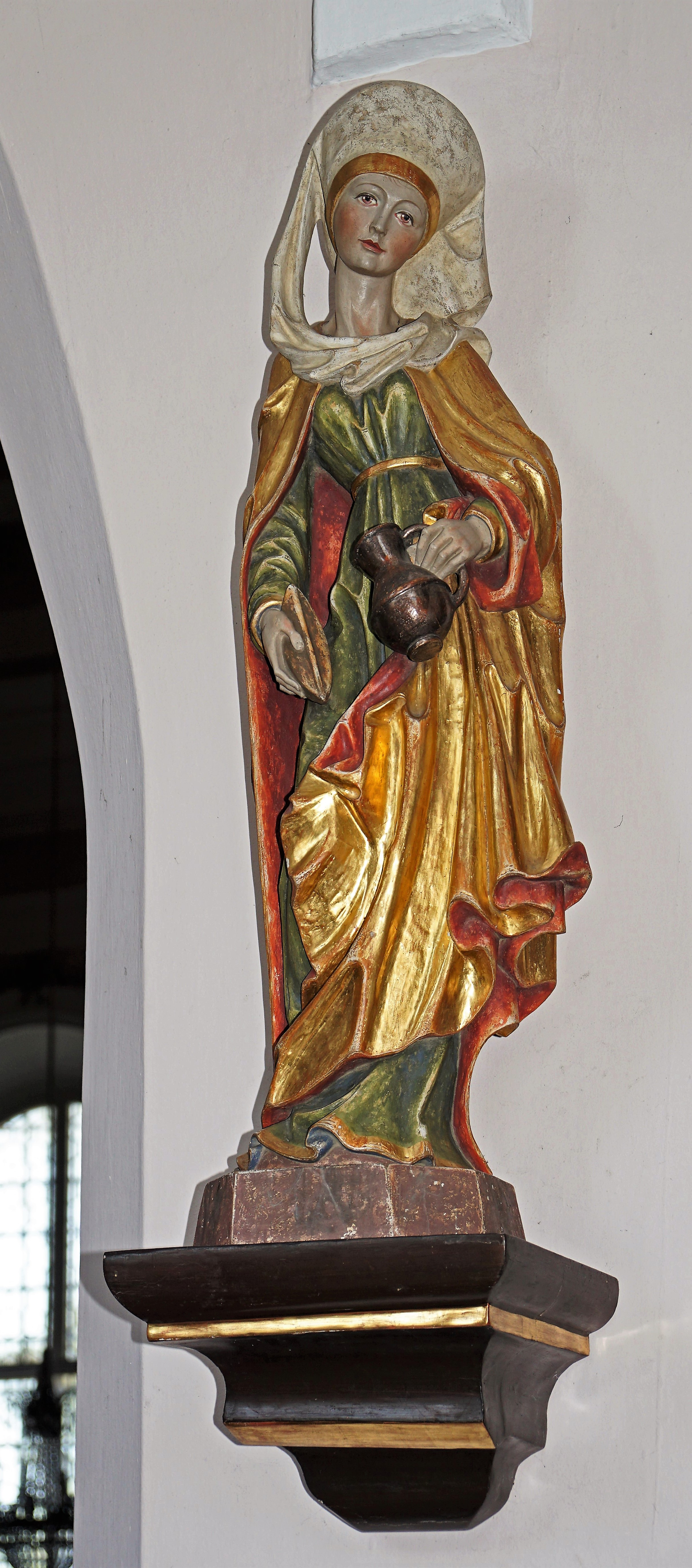
Late Gothic sculpture in Grödig parish church, Saint Verena holding a jar

In 1986, a delegation from Saint Verena's Church in Switzerland, brought a part of Saint Verena's relics to Egypt. The first Coptic church consecrated in the name of Saint Verena is Saint Maurice and Saint Verena's Church in Cairo, which was consecrated by Pope Shenouda III on 22 February 1994.

In October 2004, a delegation from the Diocese of Los Angeles in the United States of America, along with Metropolitan Serapion of Los Angeles, Fr. Joseph Boules and Fr. Gregory Bishay travelled to Switzerland to bring a part of Saint Verena's relics to her churches in Anaheim and Orange. The Anaheim church, now located in Yorba Linda, California, now has a shrine dedicated to her relic, as well as the church in Orange.

== In popular culture ==
There are numerous references to her as a paragon of Christian patience in the face of adversity in Charlotte M. Yonge's romantic novel The Heir of Redclyffe (1853).
