= Verena Gorge Hermitage =

Coordinates: 47.2258°N 7.5322°E

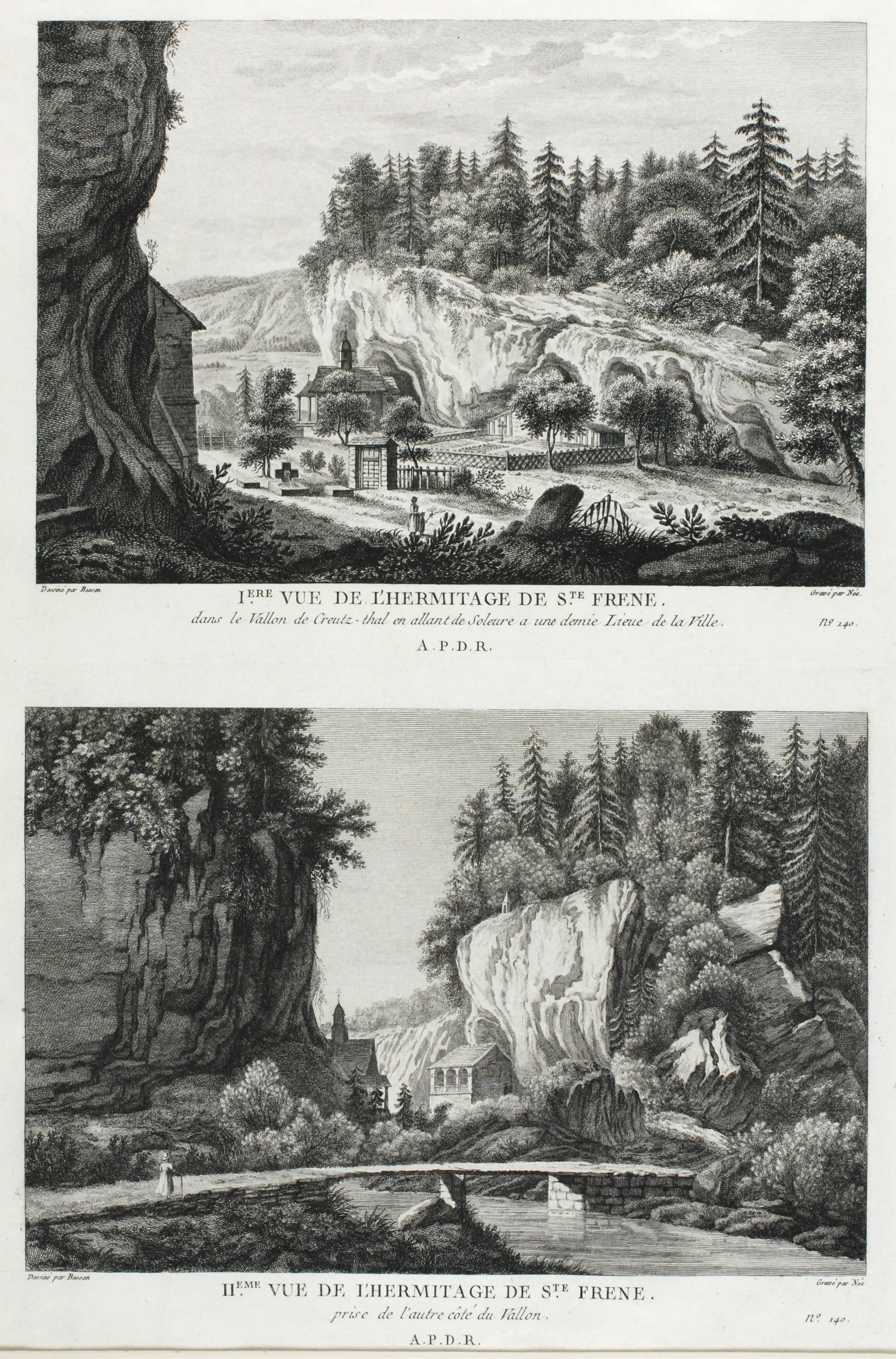
View of the hermitage and churches, between 1780 and 1790

The Verena Gorge Hermitage is a hermitage located in the Verena Gorge, to the north of the city of Solothurn, Switzerland.

== History ==
The name of the hermitage alludes to Saint Verena of Zurzach. She is said to have passed near the area, and lived in a cave near Solothurn.

The hermitage has been in existence since the 17th century. The site features Stations of the Cross dating from 1613 that were restored around 1990 by the Society of St. Verena Hermitage. The society was founded in 1810 and disbanded in 1813. A similar gesellschaft corporation was established in the late 20th century dedicated to restoration and maintenance work on the buildings and monuments of the Hermitage and its surroundings. It organizes cultural events such as guided tours, lectures and exhibitions in the Verena gorge, also offering meditations in the hermitage.

The site is situated along a 2 km hiking trail, with a 40 m gradient.

== Gallery ==
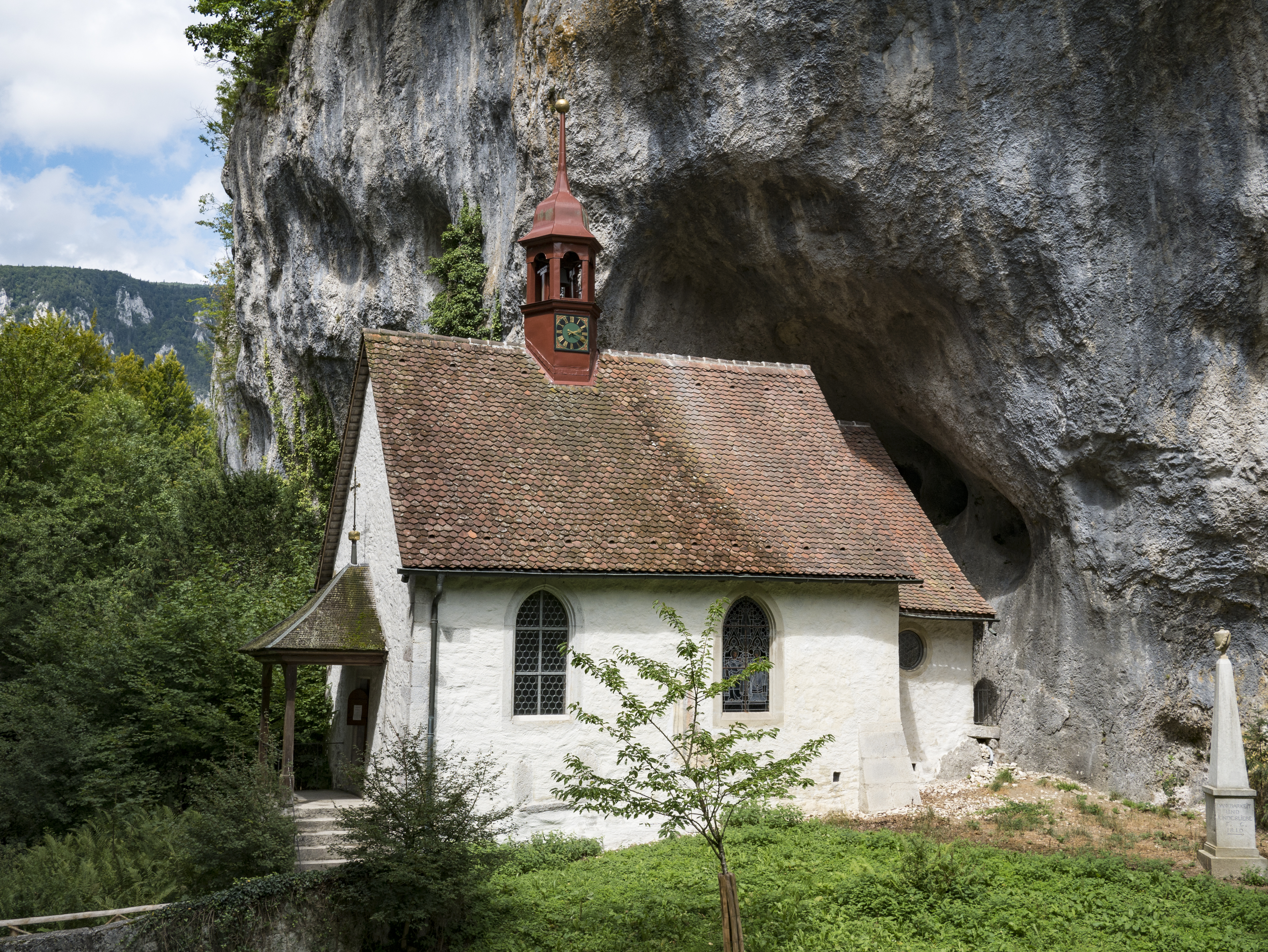
St. Martin's Chapel

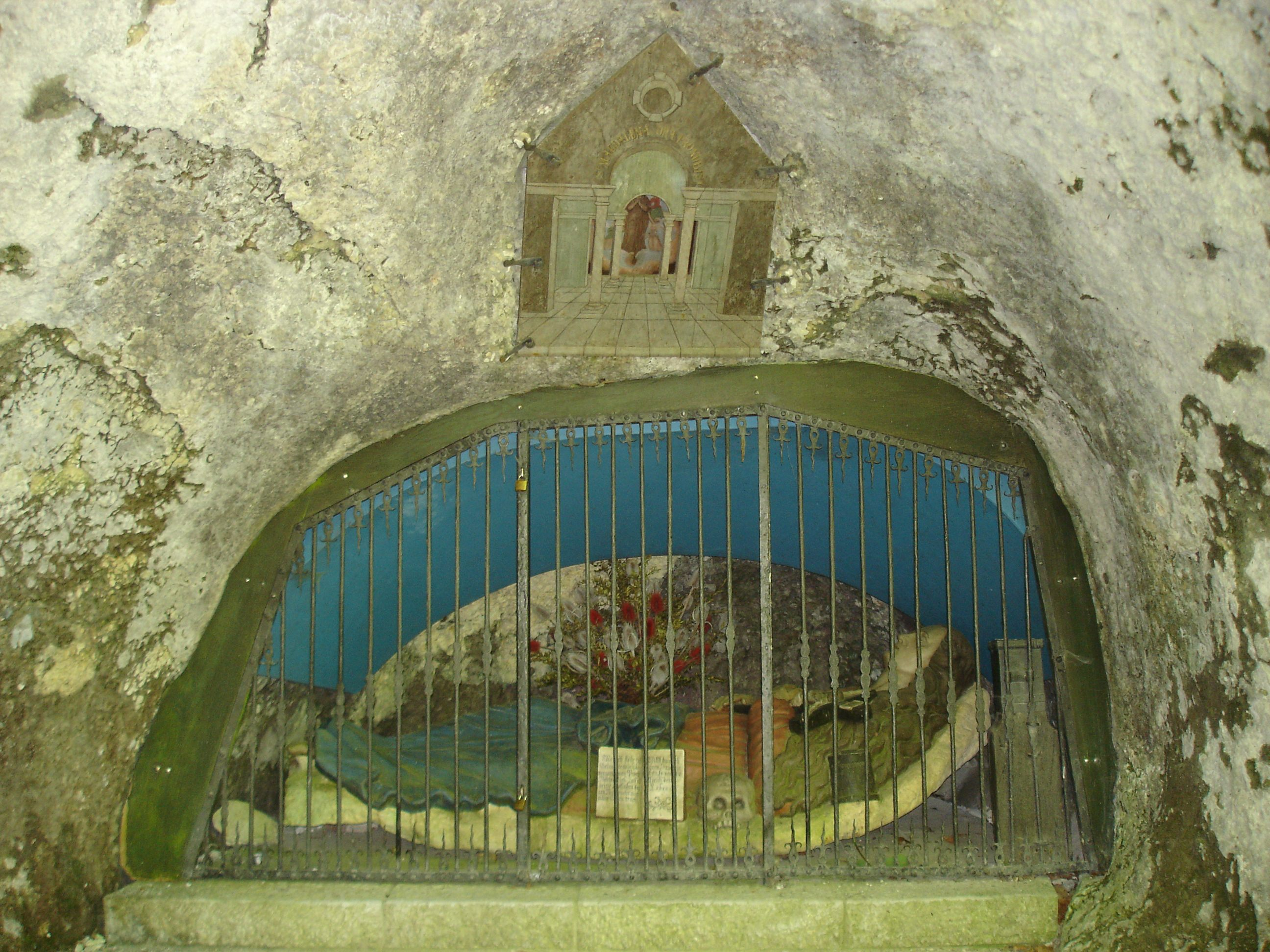
Grotto of Mary Magdalene

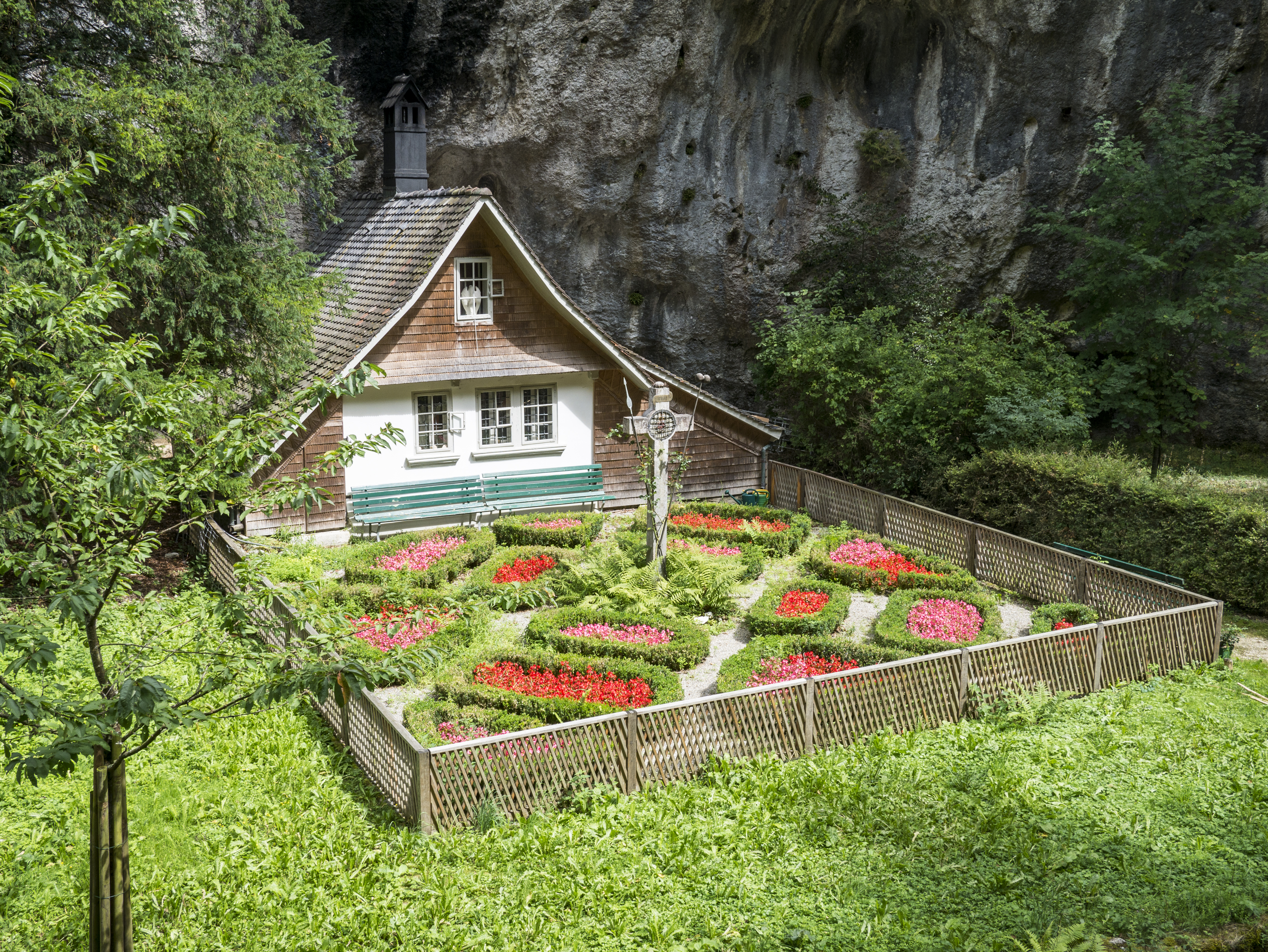
Hermitage Saint Verena

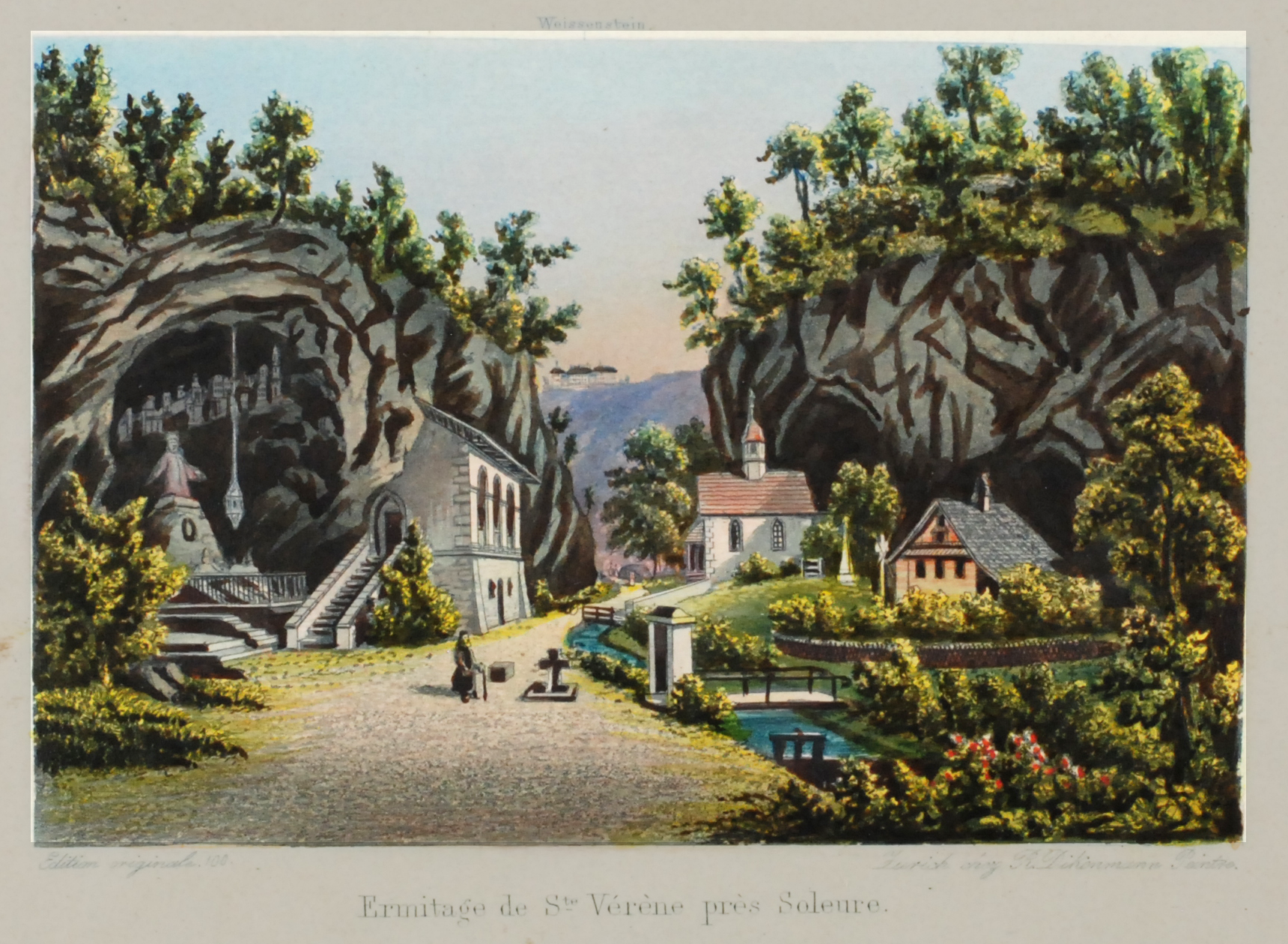
Aquatint by Bruno Moll between 1860 and 1880
