= Stella (United States coin) =

United States four-dollar coin minted 1879–1880

- United States
- Value: 4 United States dollars
- Diameter: 22 mm
- Edge: reeded
- Composition: 85.7% gold, 4.3% silver, 10% copper
- Years of minting: 1879–1880
- Mint marks: None, all were struck at the Philadelphia Mint.

Obverse
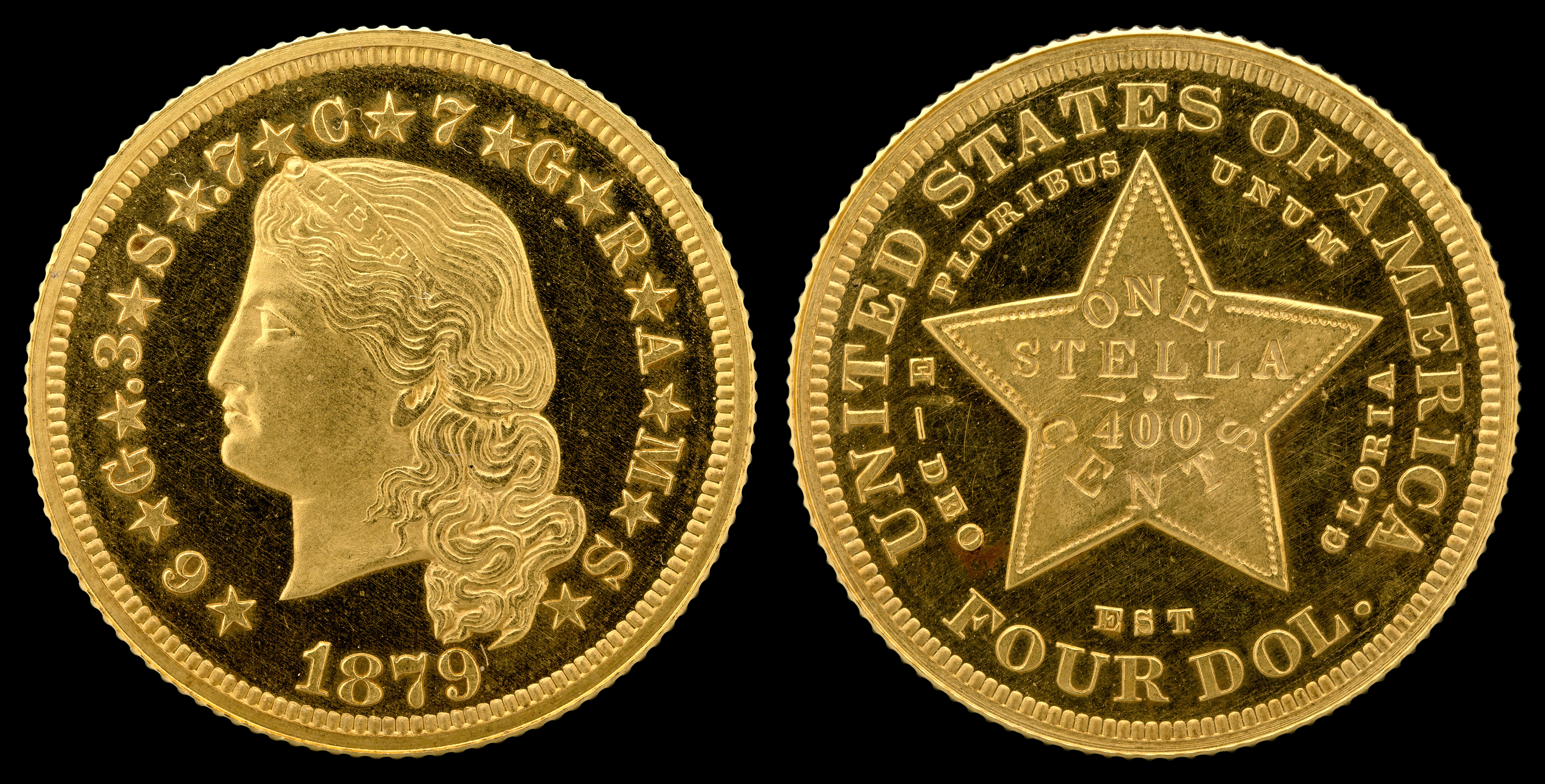
- Design: Liberty with flowing hair
- Designer: Charles E. Barber
- Design date: 1879
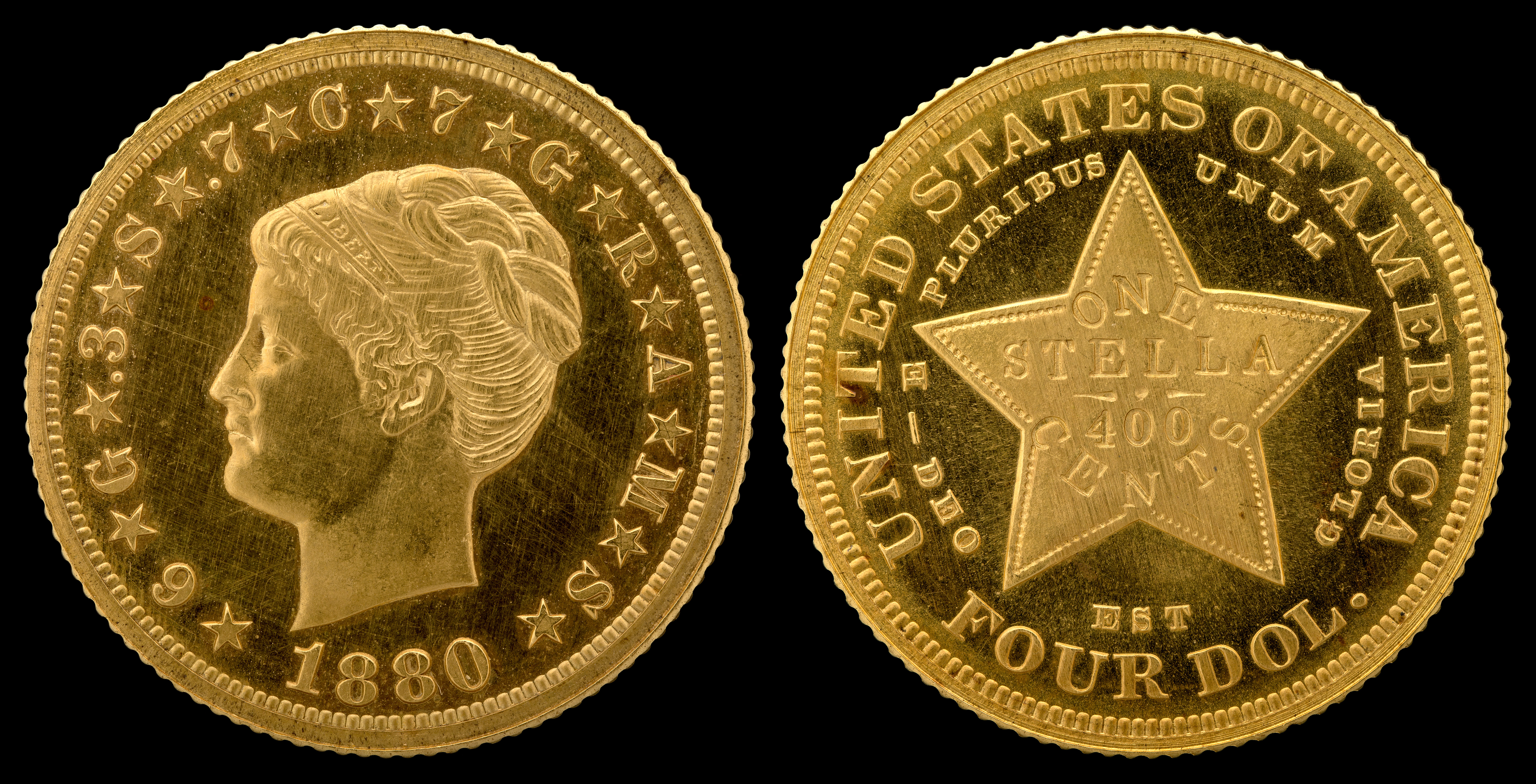
- Design: Liberty with coiled hair
- Designer: George T. Morgan
- Design date: 1879

Reverse
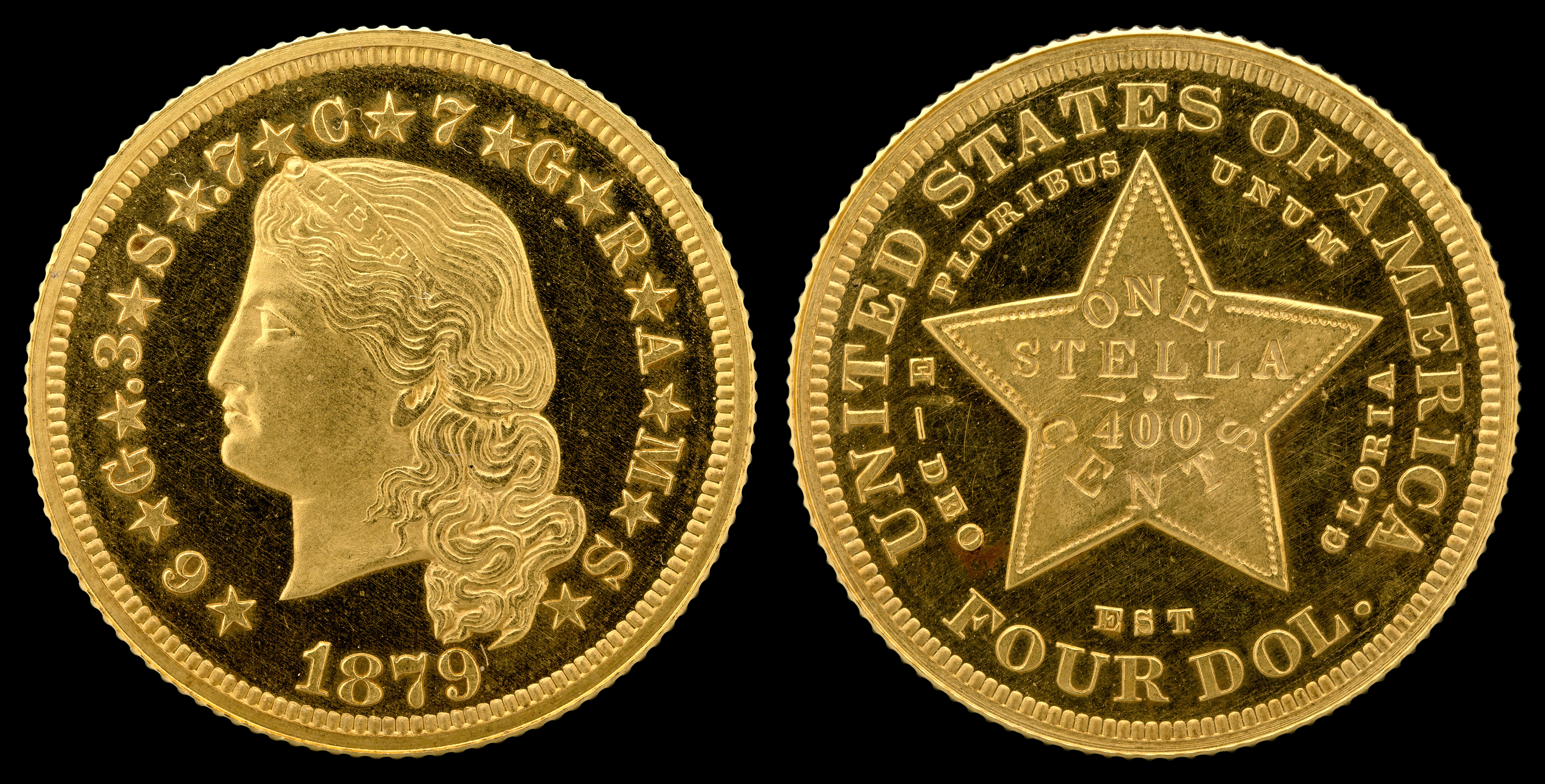
- Design: Star
- Designer: Charles E. Barber
- Design date: 1879

The United States four dollar coin, also officially called a Stella, is a unit of currency equivalent to four United States dollars.

It was originally minted as a coin tied to Latin Monetary Union standards, in preparation for possible U.S. entry to the Union. Two varieties of the Stella were made: Liberty with flowing hair, designed by Charles E. Barber, and with coiled hair, designed by George T. Morgan. The flowing hair variety is the most commonly seen variety. Even though the coin was designed as a pattern coin, similar to the Gobrecht dollar, many catalogs list the coin as a regular-issue item.

== History ==
The Stella was a pattern coin produced to explore the possibility of joining the Latin Monetary Union (LMU); these patterns were produced in 1879 and 1880 at the urging of John A. Kasson, a former chairman of the United States House Committee on Coinage, Weights, and Measures. The Stella was meant to contain a quantity of precious metal similar to that of the standard LMU gold piece, the twenty-franc Napoleon minted in France, Switzerland, and other LMU countries. However, the composition and weight of the Stella was not a precise match to the LMU standard: the total weight was 7 grams (rather than 6.45 grams), the gold content was 6 grams of fine gold (rather than 5.81 grams), and the coins were only .857 fine (rather than .900).

Two different designs obverse were produced: one with flowing hair; in the other the hair is coiled. Both bear the same inscription: "★6★G★.3★S★.7★C★7★G★R★A★M★S★" (the five-pointed glyph variant of the "★" is used) to indicate the metallic content of the coin, and the date. The reverse star had the inscriptions ONE STELLA and 400 CENTS, while the reverse rim had the legends UNITED STATES OF AMERICA and FOUR DOL., and circling the star but between its points were the legends E PLURIBUS UNUM ("Out of many, one") and DEO EST GLORIA ("To God is the glory").

The coin and the prospect of joining the Latin Monetary Union were rejected by Congress, but not before several hundred restrikes of the Barber flowing hair design had been produced and sold to Congressmen at the cost of production. These later became a source of scandal when it was noted that a number of them ended up as jewelry pieces adorning the necks of madams operating some of Washington's most infamous bordellos.

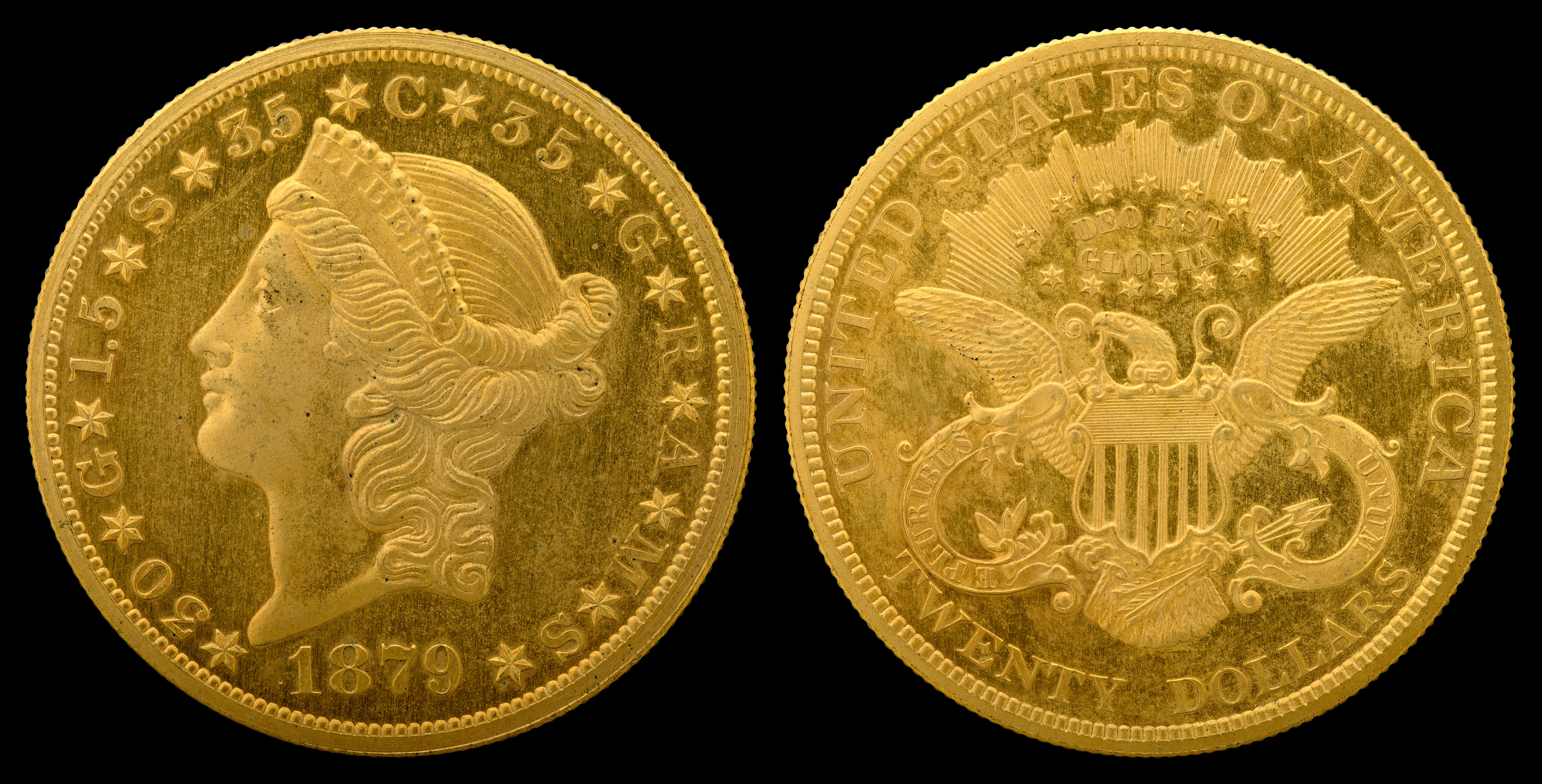
1879 Quintuple Stella Pattern

Five examples of a pattern quintuple stella denominated at 20 dollars were produced in 1879 as well. These coins used a modified version of the then-current Liberty Head (Coronet) design of the double eagle, replacing the stars on the obverse with "★30★G★1.5★S★3.5★C★35★G★R★A★M★S★", and the motto IN GOD WE TRUST on the reverse with the same DEO EST GLORIA found on the reverse of the stella.

Only 425 examples of the Stella were made. All 1880 coins are rare; 25 examples are known.
