= Latin Monetary Union =

Unified coinage system in Europe

The Monetary Convention of 23 December 1865 was a unified system of coinage that provided a degree of monetary integration among several European countries, initially Belgium, France, Italy and Switzerland, at a time when the circulation of banknotes in these countries remained relatively marginal. In early 1866, it started being referred to in the British press as the Latin Monetary Union, with the intention of making it clear that the United Kingdom would not join, and has been generally referred to under that name (French: union latine) and the acronym LMU since then. A number of countries minted coins according to the LMU standard even though they did not formally join the LMU.

The LMU has been viewed as a forerunner of late-20th-century European monetary union but cannot be directly compared with it, not least since the LMU did not rely on any common institutions. Unlike the Scandinavian Monetary Union established a few years later, the Latin Monetary Union remained limited to coinage and never extended to paper money. That made the LMU increasingly irrelevant, and it was quietly disbanded in 1926.

== History ==
Overview of contractual states (red) and associated states (other colours) between 1866 and 1914

=== Preliminary context ===
The LMU adopted the specifications of the French gold franc, which had been introduced by Napoleon I in 1803 and was struck in denominations of 5, 10, 20, 40, 50 and 100 francs, with the 20-franc coin (6.45161 grams or 99.5636 grains of .900 fine gold struck on a 21-millimetre or 0.83-inch planchet) being the most common. In the French system the gold franc was interchangeable with the silver franc based on an exchange ratio of 1:15.5, which was the approximate relative value of the two metals at the time of the law of 1803.

=== Initial treaty ===
Exemplary standard of the LMU - France (1878)
Denomination	Composition	Mass	Diameter
1 centime	Bronze	1 g	15 mm
2 centimes	Bronze	2 g	20.2 mm
5 centimes	Bronze	5 g	25 mm
10 centimes	Bronze	10 g	30 mm
20 centimes	Silver (.835)	1 g	16 mm
50 centimes	Silver (.835)	2.5 g	18 mm
1 franc	Silver (.835)	5 g	23 mm
2 francs	Silver (.835)	10 g	27 mm
5 francs	Silver (.900)	25 g	37 mm
10 francs	Gold (.900)	3.2258 g	19 mm
20 francs	Gold (.900)	6.45161 g	21 mm
50 francs	Gold (.900)	16.12903 g	28 mm
100 francs	Gold (.900)	32.25806 g	35 mm

By treaty dated 23 December 1865, France, Belgium, Italy, and Switzerland formed the Latin Monetary Union. They agreed to a combined gold and silver standard (bimetallism) with a gold-to-silver ratio of 15.5 to 1 as established in the French franc. One LMU franc represented 4.5 grams (69 grains) of fine silver or 0.290322 grams (4.48035 grains) of fine gold.

The treaty required that all four contracting states strike freely exchangeable gold coins and silver coins according to common specifications. Before the treaty, for example, the fineness of the silver coins in the four states varied from 0.800 to 0.900. The treaty required that the largest silver coin of 5 francs be struck 0.900 fine and the fractional silver of 2 francs, 1 franc, 50 centimes and 20 centimes all be struck at 0.835 fine. The agreement came into force on 1 August 1866.

The LMU served the function of facilitating trade between different countries by setting the standards by which gold and silver currency could be minted and exchanged. In this manner a French trader could accept Italian lire for his goods with confidence that they could be converted back to a comparable amount of francs.

=== Further joining members ===
The original four nations were joined by Greece on 10 April 1867, which took advantage of a clause in the treaty that guaranteed admission of foreign states that agreed to abide by the treaty. Spain and Romania also considered joining. The discussions broke off unsuccessfully, but both countries nevertheless made an attempt to conform their currencies to the LMU standard. Austria-Hungary refused to join the LMU because it rejected bimetallism, but signed a separate monetary treaty with France on December 24, 1867 whereby both states agreed to receive into their treasuries one another's gold coins at specified rates. Austria-Hungary thereafter minted some but not all of its gold coins on the LMU standard, including the 4 and 8 florin, which matched the specifications of the French 10 and 20 francs. Serbia, the Papal States, and San Marino were among other countries that applied to join the LMU but were not accepted. With the tacit agreement of Napoleon III of France, Giacomo Antonelli, the administrator of the Papal Treasury, embarked in 1866 on an ambitious increase in silver coinage, equivalent to Belgium's total. The papal coins excessively circulated in other union states, (Note: Not borne out by references in coin catalogues, e.g. Krause & Mishler, Standard Catalog of World Coins, 19th century, which shows LMU standard finenesses for Papal States silver and gold coinage with no debasement.) to the profit of the Holy See (as the lower denominations contained a lower purity of silver compared to the 5 Fr. coin), but Swiss and French banks rejected papal coins and the Papal States were ejected from the Union in 1870, owing 20 million lire.

Other states later adopted the system without formally joining the treaty. Peru had adopted the franc system by law on July 31, 1863. The colonies of France (including Algeria) came under the scope of the treaty in 1865. Colombia and Venezuela followed in 1871. The Grand Duchy of Finland adopted the system on August 9, 1877; Serbia on November 11, 1878; and Bulgaria on May 17, 1880. Coins struck for the Spanish territory of Puerto Rico in 1895 adhered to the standard, with one peso to five Spanish pesetas. In 1904, the Danish West Indies were also placed on this standard but did not join the Union itself. When Albania emerged from the Ottoman Empire as an independent nation in 1912, coins of the Latin Monetary Union from France, Italy, Greece, and Austria-Hungary began to circulate in place of the Ottoman lira. Albania did not, however, mint its own coins or issue its own paper money until it adopted an independent monetary system in 1925.

== Issues ==
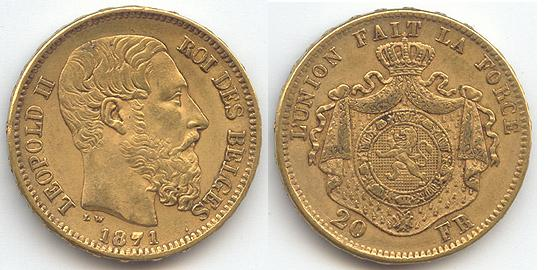
Belgium, 20 gold francs (90% fine)

=== Bimetallism failure ===
From the beginning, fluctuations in the relative value of gold and silver on the world market stressed the currency union. This is today recognized as an inevitable effect of a currency based on bimetallism when precious metal prices fluctuate. When the LMU was formed in 1865, silver was nearing the end of a period of high valuation compared to gold. In 1873 the value of silver dropped significantly, followed by a sharp increase in silver imports in the LMU countries, particularly in France and Belgium. By 1873, the decreasing value of silver made it profitable to mint silver in exchange for gold at the Union's standard rate of 15.5 : 1. Indeed, in all of 1871 and 1872 the French mint had received just 5,000,000 francs of silver for conversion to coin, but in 1873 alone received 154,000,000 francs. Fearing an influx of silver coinage, the member nations of the Union agreed in Paris on January 30, 1874, to limit the free conversion of silver temporarily. By 1878, with no recovery in the silver price in sight, minting of silver coinage was suspended absolutely. From 1873 onwards, the Union was on a de facto gold standard. The law still permitted payment in silver, but the 5 franc silver pieces were "essentially upon the same footing as banknotes".

Germany's conversion to gold was one source of the pressure on the Union. The law of 4 December 1871 named one tenth of a new imperial gold coin a mark, divided it into 100 pfennigs and authorized gold coins of 10 and 20 marks. The Coinage Act of 9 July 1873 made the mark the unit of account of the Reich gold currency, which was to replace the state currencies. An imperial ordinance of 22 September 1875 set 1 January 1876 as the date on which the Reich currency came into force throughout Germany.

During the conversion, the German government withdrew old silver coins, melted them and sold the bullion. Germany kept selling off its demonetized silver for several years after the 1871 and 1873 legislation, until mounting losses forced a halt to bullion sales on 19 May 1879. German one-thaler pieces nevertheless remained legal tender at three marks each through 30 September 1907. In both systems, the shift to gold did not immediately clear large legacy silver coins from circulation.

More importantly, because new discoveries and better refining techniques increased the supply of silver, the fixed LMU exchange rate eventually overvalued silver relative to gold. German traders, in particular, were known to bring silver to LMU countries, have it minted into coins, then exchange them for gold coins at the discounted exchange rate. These destabilizing tactics eventually forced the LMU to convert to a pure gold standard for its currency in 1878.

=== Paper money issues ===
According to the Financial Times, another major problem of the LMU was that it failed to outlaw the printing of paper money based on the bimetallic currency. France and Italy exploited this by printing banknotes to fund their own endeavours.

=== Effect of the Great War ===
In 1922 the Latvian lat and in 1924 the Polish złoty adopted the LMU standard.

The political turbulence of the early twentieth century which culminated in the First World War brought the Latin Monetary Union to its final end in practice, even though it continued de jure until 1927, when it came to a formal end.

The last coins made according to the standards (i.e., diameter, weight and silver fineness) of the Union were the Swiss half, one-franc, and two-franc pieces of 1967. (Note: The cupro-nickel 1/2, 1 and 2-franc coins made since 1968 were also still of LMU-standard weight and diameter, though no longer silver.) However, Austria still mints 4- and 8-florin gold coins to the LMU specifications for collectors and investors, and modern gold rounds to LMU standards are also commercially minted.

== Impact ==
A 2018 study in the European Review of Economic History found that the LMU had no significant effects on trade, except during the period 1865–1874.

The Latin Monetary Union inspired the Scandinavian Monetary Union, established in 1873.

== Coins ==
Below are examples of five-unit silver coins:

5 Greek drachmae 1876

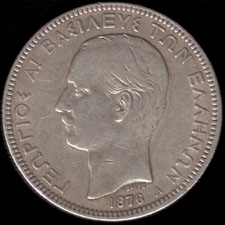
George I of Greece

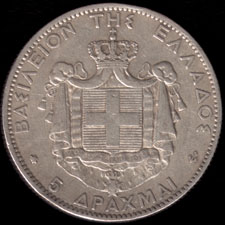
Coat of arms of Greece

5 Belgian francs 1868

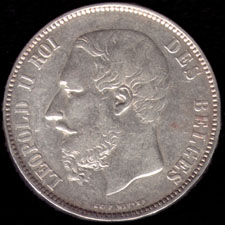
Leopold II of Belgium

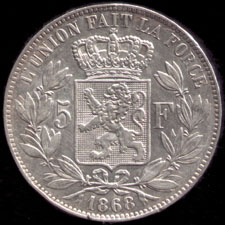
Coat of arms of Belgium

5 French francs 1868

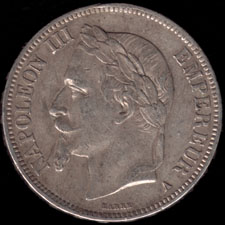
Napoleon III of France

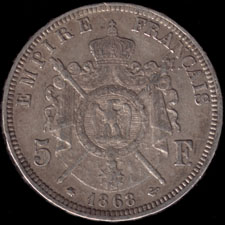
Coat of arms of the Second Empire

5 Italian lire 1874

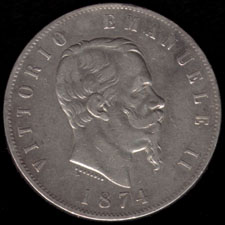
Victor Emmanuel II of Italy

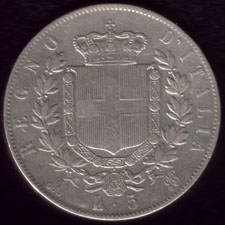
Coat of arms of the House of Savoy

5 Spanish pesetas 1885

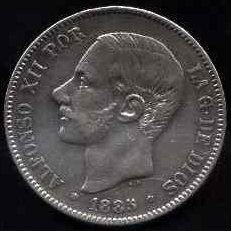
Alfonso XII of Spain

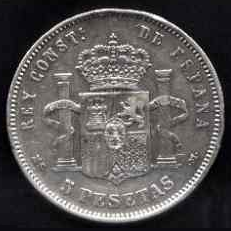
Coat of arms of Spain

5 Venezuelan bolívares 1912

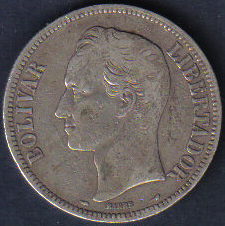
Simón Bolívar

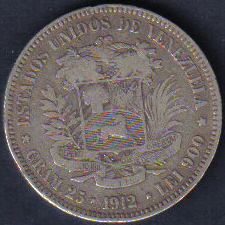
Coat of arms of Venezuela

5 Swiss Francs 1889
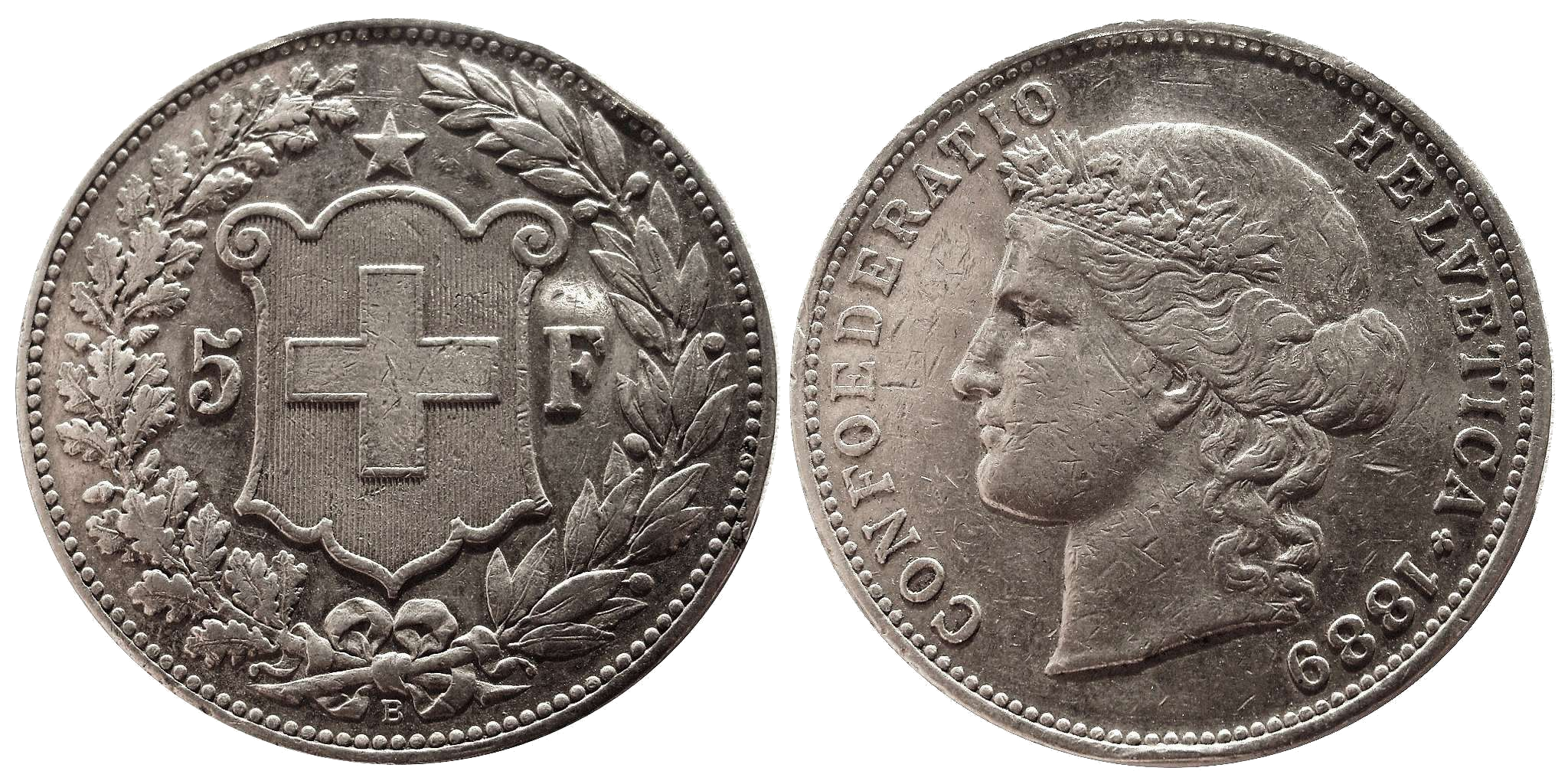
First side of the image: Coat of arms of Switzerland
Second side of the image: Libertas
5 Romanian lei 1883
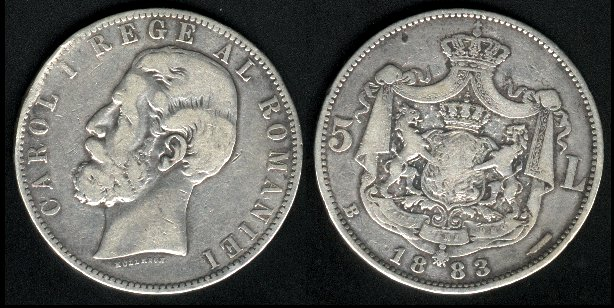
First side of the image: Carol I of Romania
Second side of the image: Coat of arms of Romania

== See also ==
- Bimetallism
- Economic and Monetary Union of the European Union
- Euro
- Latin Union
- Spanish peseta
- Stella (United States coin)
- Vreneli
