= Bad Zurzach =

- Former municipality
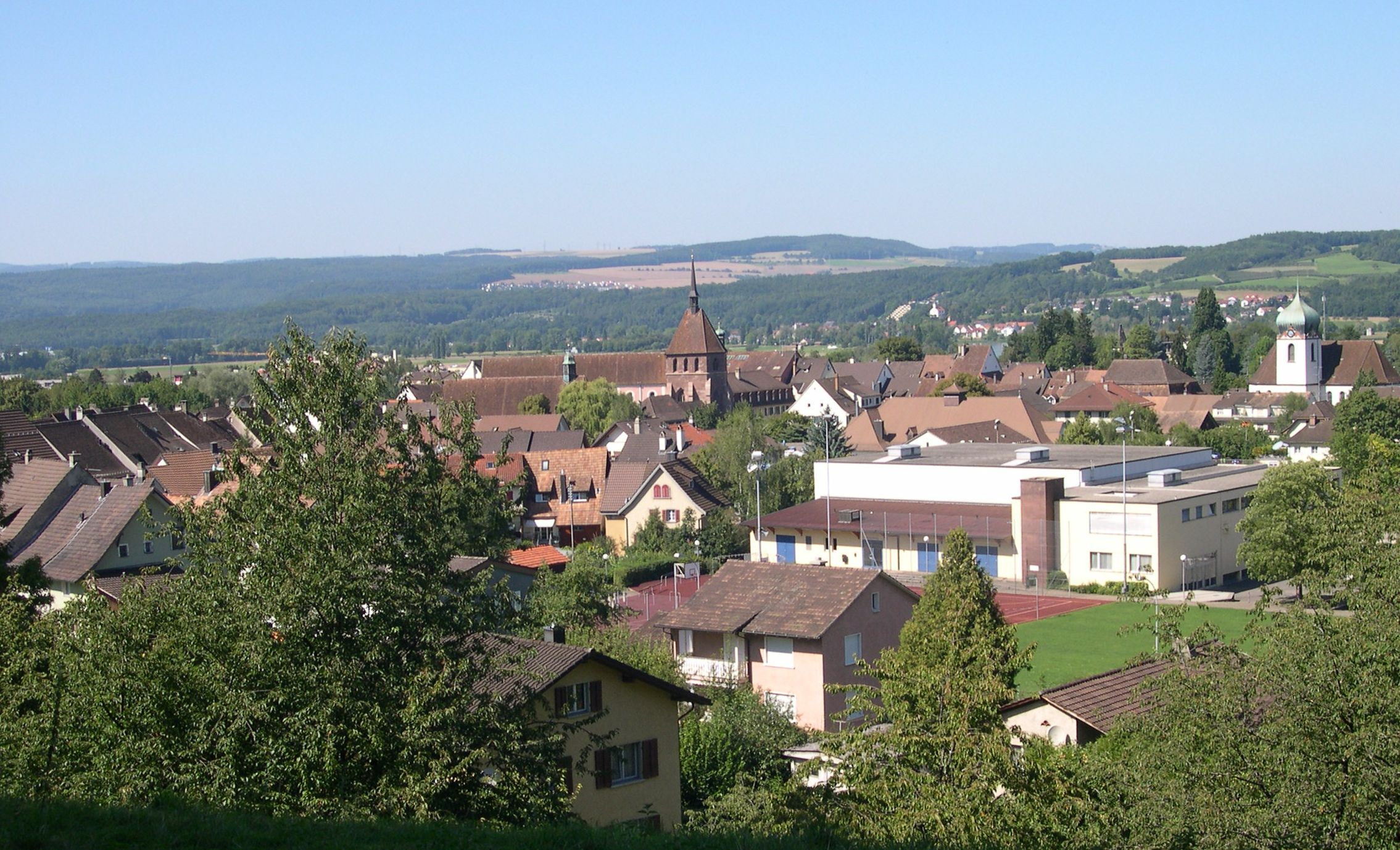

- Flag Coat of arms
- Location of Bad Zurzach
- Location within Switzerland Location within Canton of Aargau
- Coordinates: 47°36′N 8°18′E
- Country: Switzerland
- Canton: Aargau
- District: Zurzach

Government
  - Executive: Gemeinderat with 5 members
  - Mayor: Gemeindeammann; Reto S. Fuchs Ind. (as of 2013)
  - Parliament: None (Gemeindeversammlung)

Area
  - Total: 6.52 km^{2} (2.52 sq mi)
- Elevation (Hauptstrasse/Schwertgasse): 340 m (1,120 ft)

Population (December 2020)
  - Total: 4,379
  - Density: 672/km^{2} (1,740/sq mi)
- Time zone: UTC+01:00 (CET)
  - Summer (DST): UTC+02:00 (CEST)
- Postal code: 5330
- SFOS number: 4323
- ISO 3166 code: CH-AG
- Surrounded by: Döttingen, Klingnau, Küssaberg (DE-BW), Rekingen, Rietheim, Tegerfelden
- Website: www.badzurzach.ch

Bad Zurzach (Swiss Standard German pronunciation: [baːd ˈtsʊrtsax]) is a village and former municipality in the district of Zurzach in the canton of Aargau in Switzerland. It is the seat of the district. On 1 January 2022 the former municipalities of Bad Zurzach, Baldingen, Böbikon, Kaiserstuhl, Rekingen, Rietheim, Rümikon and Wislikofen merged into the new municipality of Zurzach.

Bad Zurzach was previously known as Zurzach; the population voting for the official name change in a referendum of 21 May 2006. Located on the Rhine, Bad Zurzach has a thermal water bath and an outdoor bathing facility. The old market town, the St. Verena convent church with its treasure, the Roman Catholic Church and the late Roman castle Tenedo on the Kirchlibuck hill are listed as heritage sites of national significance.

== Geography ==
Aerial view (1953)

Bad Zurzach has an area, as of 2009, of 6.52 square kilometers (2.52 sq mi). Of this area, 1.64 km^{2} (0.63 sq mi) or 25.2% is used for agricultural purposes, while 2.78 km^{2} (1.07 sq mi) or 42.6% is forested. Of the rest of the land, 1.82 km^{2} (0.70 sq mi) or 27.9% is settled (buildings or roads), 0.28 km^{2} (0.11 sq mi) or 4.3% is either rivers or lakes and 0.01 km^{2} (2.5 acres) or 0.2% is unproductive land.

Of the built up area, industrial buildings made up 3.1% of the total area while housing and buildings made up 12.7% and transportation infrastructure made up 7.5%. while parks, green belts and sports fields made up 4.3%. Out of the forested land, 40.8% of the total land area is heavily forested and 1.8% is covered with orchards or small clusters of trees. Of the agricultural land, 15.3% is used for growing crops and 8.7% is pastures, while 1.1% is used for orchards or vine crops. All the water in the municipality is flowing water.

Across the river Rhein is the village of Rheinheim in the German state of Baden-Württemberg.

== Coat of arms ==
The blazon of the municipal coat of arms is Argent a Letter Z Sable.

== Demographics ==
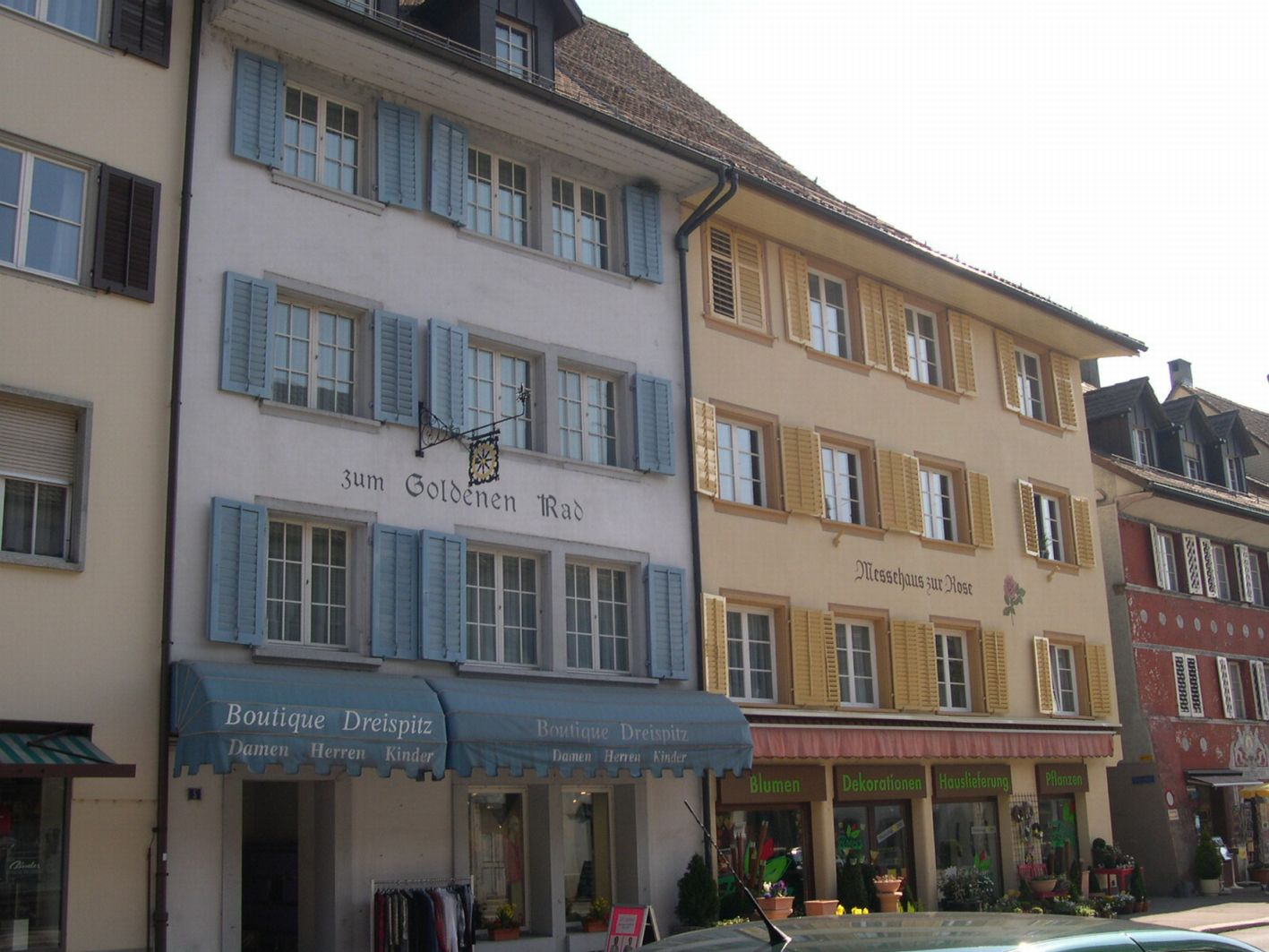
Houses along Schwertgasse

Bad Zurzach has a population (as of December 2020) of 4,379. As of 2008, 34.7% of the population are foreign nationals. Over the last 10 years (1997–2007) the population has changed at a rate of 4.2%. Most of the population (as of 2000) speaks German (82.9%), with Serbo-Croatian being second most common (3.3%) and Italian being third (3.2%).

As of 2008, the gender distribution of the population was 49.9% male and 50.1% female. The population was made up of 1,274 Swiss men (31.6% of the population), and 736 (18.3%) non-Swiss men. There were 1,410 Swiss women (35.0%), and 610 (15.1%) non-Swiss women. In 2008 there were 17 live births to Swiss citizens and 11 births to non-Swiss citizens, and in same time span there were 39 deaths of Swiss citizens and 7 non-Swiss citizen deaths. Ignoring immigration and emigration, the population of Swiss citizens decreased by 22 while the foreign population increased by 4. There were 2 Swiss men who emigrated from Switzerland to another country, 1 Swiss woman who emigrated from Switzerland to another country, 69 non-Swiss men who emigrated from Switzerland to another country and 40 non-Swiss women who emigrated from Switzerland to another country. The total Swiss population change in 2008 (from all sources) was a decrease of 39 and the non-Swiss population change was an increase of 66 people. This represents a population growth rate of 0.7%.

The age distribution, as of 2008, in Bad Zurzach is; 310 children or 7.6% of the population are between 0 and 9 years old and 482 teenagers or 11.9% are between 10 and 19. Of the adult population, 482 people or 11.9% of the population are between 20 and 29 years old. 404 people or 9.9% are between 30 and 39, 690 people or 17.0% are between 40 and 49, and 605 people or 14.9% are between 50 and 59. The senior population distribution is 497 people or 12.2% of the population are between 60 and 69 years old, 373 people or 9.2% are between 70 and 79, there are 184 people or 4.5% who are between 80 and 89, and there are 34 people or 0.8% who are 90 and older.

As of 2000, there were 271 homes with 1 or 2 persons in the household, 811 homes with 3 or 4 persons in the household, and 501 homes with 5 or more persons in the household. As of 2000, there were 1,653 private households (homes and apartments) in the municipality, and an average of 2.3 persons per household. In 2008 there were 564 single family homes (or 28.5% of the total) out of a total of 1,978 homes and apartments. There were a total of 16 empty apartments for a 0.8% vacancy rate. As of 2007, the construction rate of new housing units was 2.5 new units per 1000 residents.

In the 2007 federal election the most popular party was the SVP which received 34.58% of the vote. The next three most popular parties were the CVP (20.8%), the SP (19.14%) and the FDP (12.88%). In the federal election, a total of 1,103 votes were cast, and the voter turnout was 48.2%.

The historical population is given in the following table:

Historical population
Year	Pop.	±%
1975	3,072	—
1980	3,141	+2.2%
1990	3,641	+15.9%
2000	3,905	+7.3%

== Heritage sites of national significance ==
There are six sites in Bad Zurzach that are Swiss heritage site of national significance. Two of the sites are churches, the former collegiate church of St. Verena on Hauptstrasse and the Reformed Church at Schwertgasse 153. In the city, the Gasthof (combination hotel and restaurant) Zur Waag at Hauptstrasse 25 and the Salzbohrtürme on Bohrturmweg are both on the list. Outside the old city, the Tenedo (which has been a pre-historic, Roman era, medieval and modern settlement) and the Roman Rhine watchtower at Oberfeld make up the rest.

The entire town of Bad Zurzach is designated as part of the Inventory of Swiss Heritage Sites.

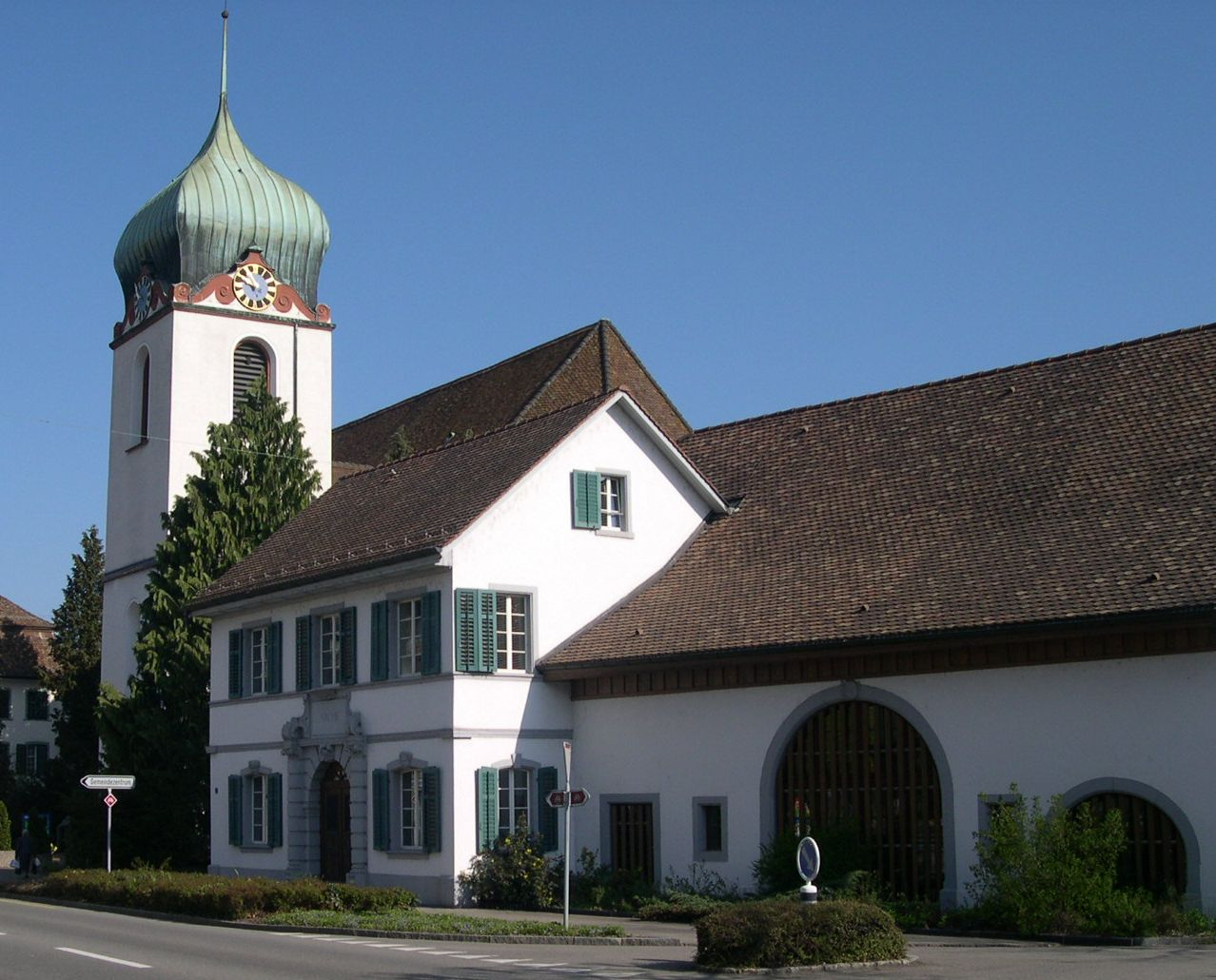
Reformed Church of Bad Zurzach

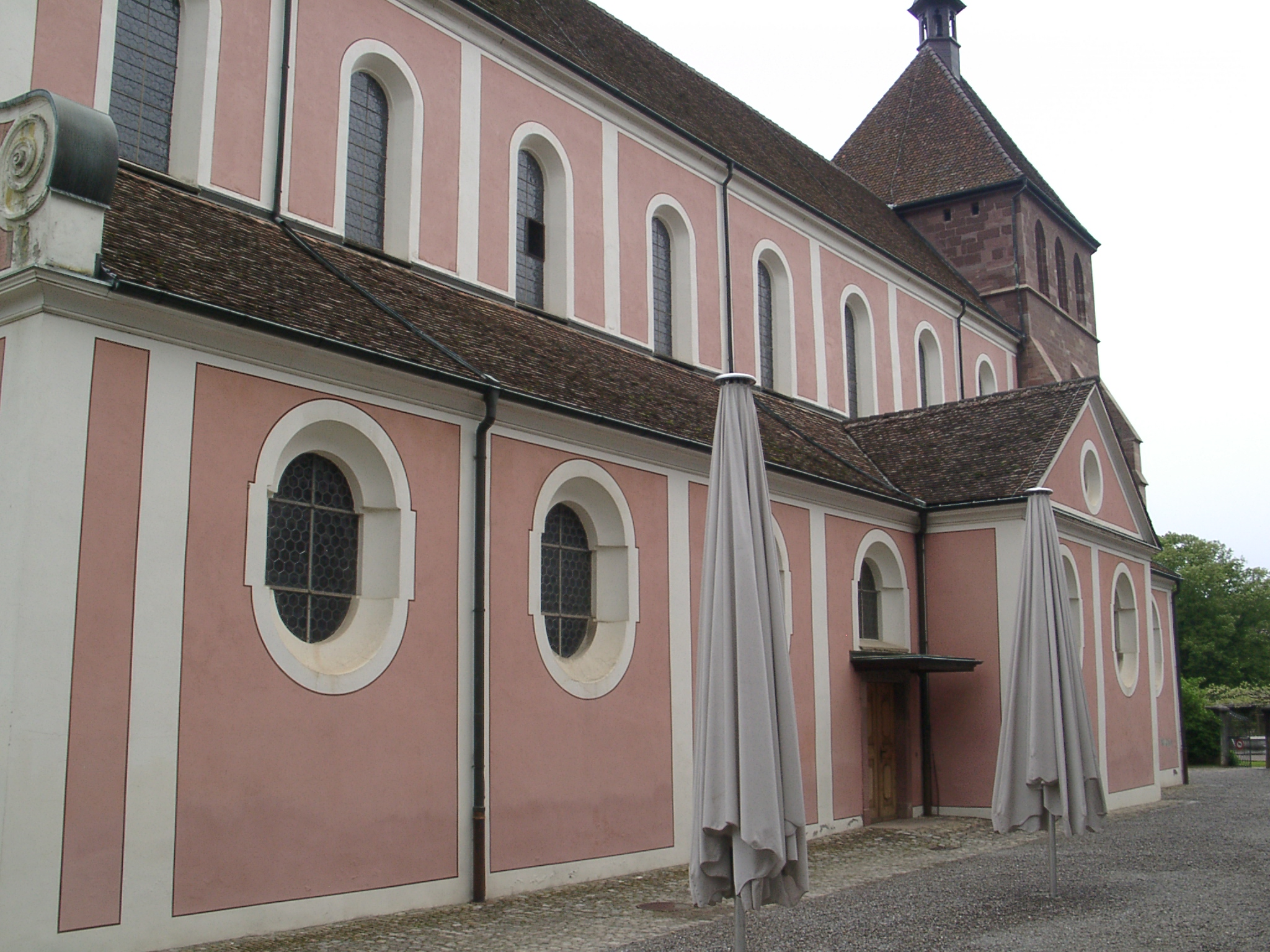
St. Verena Church

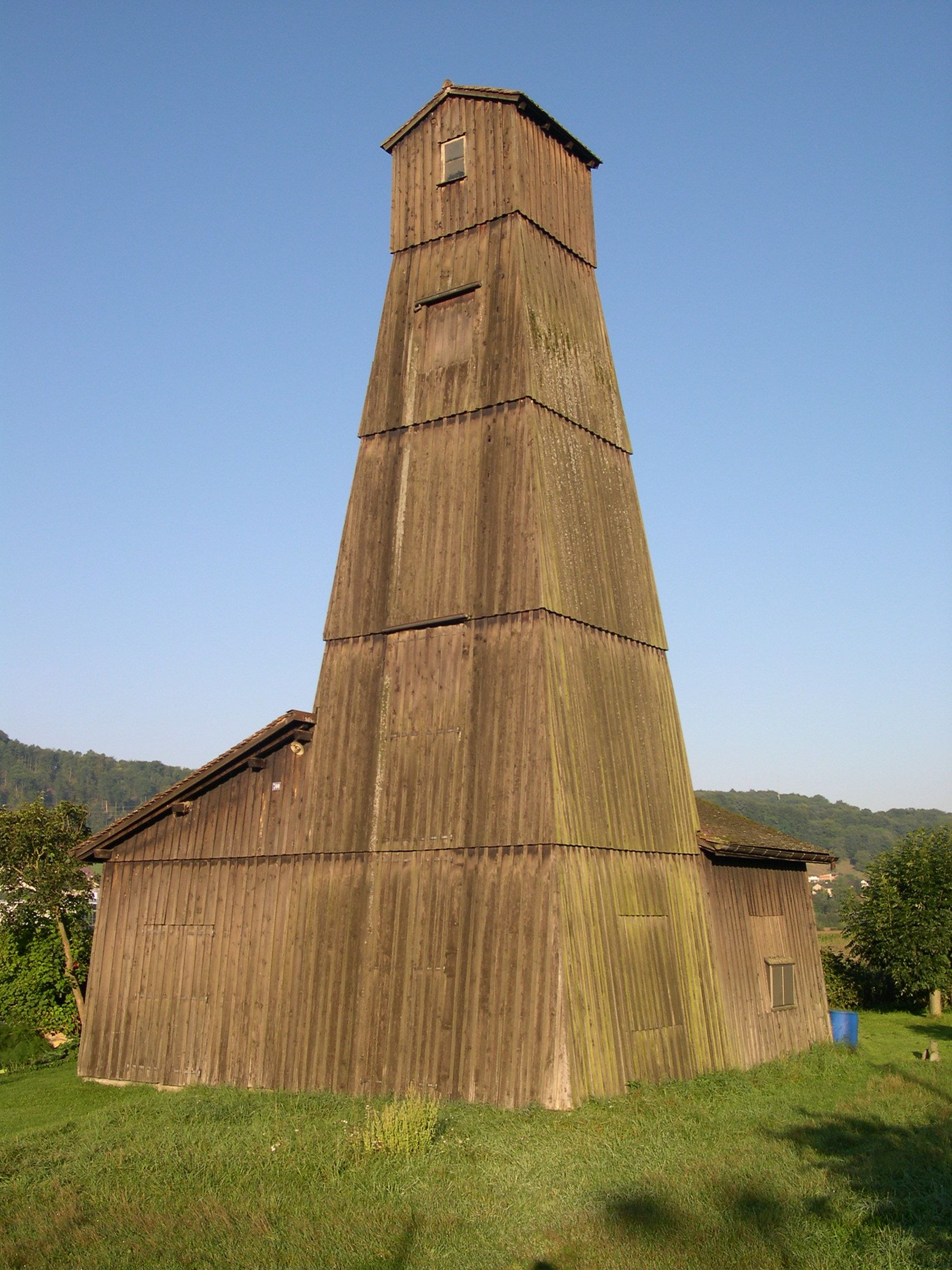
Bohrturm near Zurzach

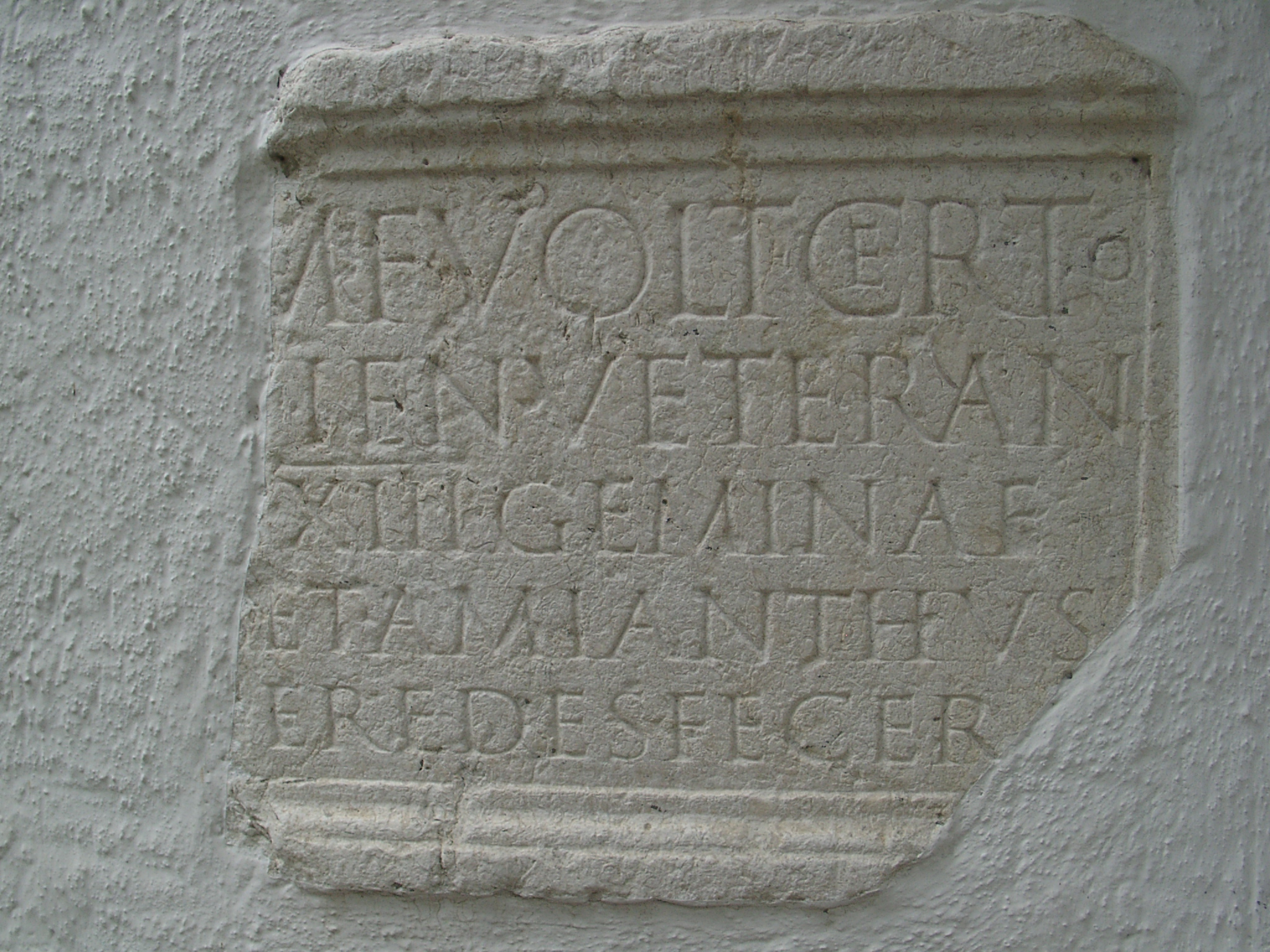
Roman inscription from Tenedo

== Economy ==
As of 2007, Bad Zurzach had an unemployment rate of 2.04%. As of 2005, there were 24 people employed in the primary economic sector and about 9 businesses involved in this sector. 397 people are employed in the secondary sector and there are 38 businesses in this sector. 1,874 people are employed in the tertiary sector, with 205 businesses in this sector.

In 2000 there were 2,017 workers who lived in the municipality. Of these, 1,129 or about 56.0% of the residents worked outside Bad Zurzach while 1,026 people commuted into the municipality for work. There were a total of 1,914 jobs (of at least 6 hours per week) in the municipality. Of the working population, 12.5% used public transportation to get to work, and 40.9% used a private car.

A few multinational companies have their offices, warehouses or production facilities in Bad Zurzach. Female underwear brand Triumph has its Global headquarter in this city. Textile technology company HeiQ used to have its headquarters also in Bad Zurzach (2009-2016) before it moved its headquarters to Zurich in October 2016. Its production facility, however, remains in the Solvay Industry Areal in Bad Zurzach.

== Religion ==
From the 2000 census, 1,730 or 44.4% were Roman Catholic, while 1,149 or 29.5% belonged to the Swiss Reformed Church. Of the rest of the population, there were 9 individuals (or about 0.23% of the population) who belonged to the Christian Catholic faith.

== Notable people ==
- Verena, (ca. 260–320 in Zurzach), Egyptian Coptic saint, who became the patron saint of the city
- Charles Rodolf (1818 in Zurzach - ??) a member of the Wisconsin State Assembly, emigrated in 1833
- Emil Welti (1825 in Zurzach - 1899) a Swiss politician, lawyer and judge
- Alex Widmer (1956 in Zurzach – 2008) a Swiss banker, CEO of the Julius Baer Group

== Education ==
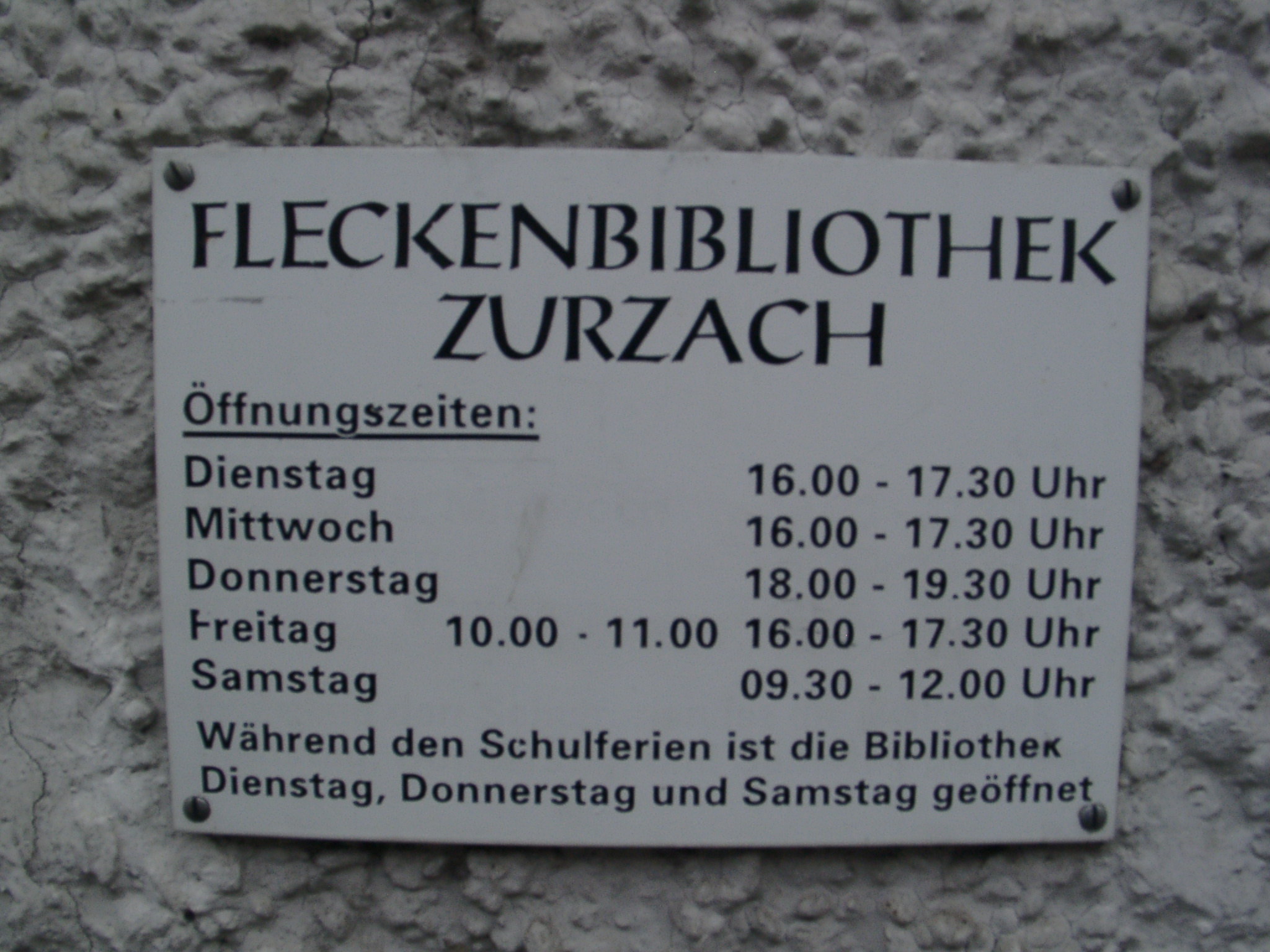
Fleckenbibliothek (library) Bad Zurzach sign

In Bad Zurzach about 66.8% of the population (between age 25–64) have completed either non-mandatory upper secondary education or additional higher education (either university or a Fachhochschule). Of the school age population (in the 2008/2009 school year), there are 262 students attending primary school, there are 170 students attending secondary school, there are 133 students attending tertiary or university level schooling in the municipality.

Bad Zurzach is home to the Fleckenbibliothek Bad Zurzach library. The library has (as of 2008) 10,302 books or other media, and loaned out 33,758 items in the same year. It was open a total of 298 days with average of 11 hours per week during that year.

== Transport ==
Bad Zurzach station is served by Zurich S-Bahn line S36, which links Bülach and Waldshut, and by alternate trains on Aargau S-Bahn line S27, which link Baden and Bad Zurzach.
