= Coat of arms of Guatemala =

Coat of arms of Guatemala Escudo de Guatemala

Versions
- Version without the shield
- Armiger: Republic of Guatemala
- Adopted: 18 November 1871
- Shield: "A shield with two rifles and two swords crossed with a wreath of laurel on a field of light blue. The middle will harbor a scroll of parchment with the words "Liberty 15 of September of 1821" in gold and in the upper part a Resplendent quetzal as the symbol of national independence and autonomy."
- Motto: Libertad 15 de septiembre de 1821 "Freedom September 15, 1821"

The current coat of arms of Guatemala was adopted after the 1871 Liberal Revolution by a decree of president Miguel García Granados. It consists of multiple symbols representing liberty and sovereignty on a bleu celeste shield. According to government specifications, the coat of arms should be depicted without the shield only when on the flag, but the version lacking the shield is often used counter to these regulations.

== History ==
In 1871, for the 50th anniversary of Guatemala gaining independence, president Miguel García Granados asked the mint to produce a design to commemorate the event. The Swiss engraver Johann-Baptist Frener possibly designed the shield, and Granados decided to adopt it as the national coat of arms, abandoning the previous coat of arms which had conservative symbolism. In Executive Decree No. 33 of 18 November, the coat of arms was described:

The arms of the republic will be: a shield with two rifles and two swords crossed with a wreath of laurel on a field of light blue. The middle will harbor a scroll of parchment with the words "Liberty 15 of September of 1821" in gold and in the upper part a Quetzal as the symbol of national independence and autonomy.

The flag and coat of arms were further regulated in detail in a 12 September 1968 decree by the government of president Julio César Méndez Montenegro, specifying the elements, colors, and the specific shade of blue on the shield. The coat of arms specifically includes Remington rifles as they were used during the 1871 Liberal Revolution, which encouraged the adoption of the new coat of arms. Due to the coat of arms being on the flag, it makes Guatemala the only country aside of Zimbabwe to include a specific brand of firearm on their national flag. In 1997, new legislation corrected the spelling on the scroll from SETIEMBRE (as is mentioned in the 1968 legislation) to SEPTIEMBRE.

== Symbolism ==
The elements of the coat of arms has the following symbolism: The Resplendent quetzal is the national bird of Guatemala and represents freedom and independence of the nation. The crossed Remington rifles are the type used during the 1871 Liberal Revolution and represent the will to defend Guatemala's interests. The crossed swords represent justice and honor. The laurel wreath represents victory. The parchment at the center reads "LIBERTAD 15 DE SEPTIEMBRE DE 1821" (Liberty 15 of September of 1821), the date Guatemala gained independence from Spain.

== Historical coats of arms ==
1823–1838 (within Central America)

1825–1843

1843–1851

1851–1858

1858–1871

1871–1968

1968–1997

1997–present
