= Battle of Arbedo =

1422 battle during the Transalpine campaigns of the Old Swiss Confederacy

- Part of Transalpine campaigns
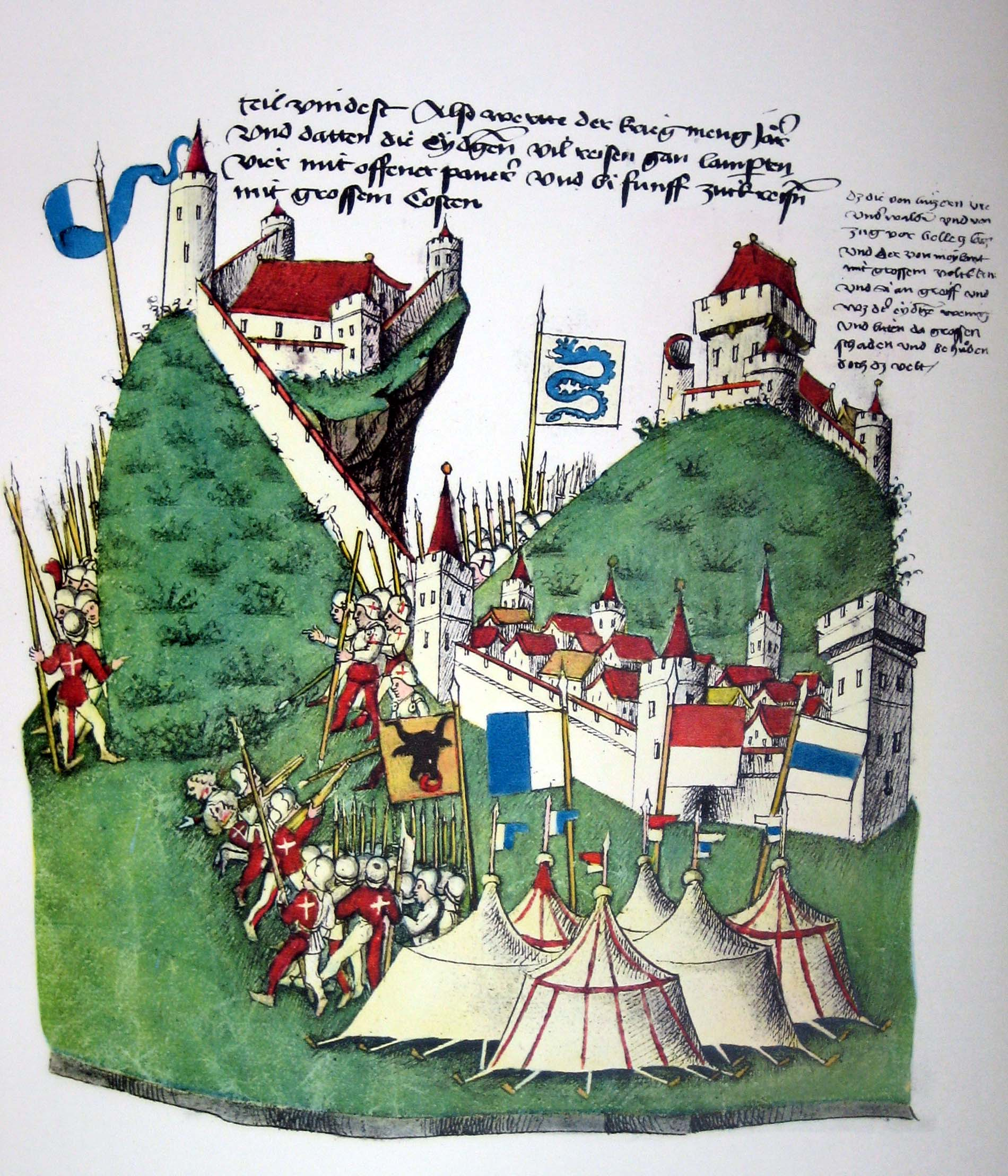
- Illustration from the Tschachtlanchronik, 1470
Date	June 30, 1422
Location	Arbedo, Ticino, Switzerland 46.21°N 9.04°E
Result	Milanese victory: Swiss expansions checked; Bellinzona defended and the Leventina returned to Milan

Belligerents
Duchy of Milan	Swiss Confederates: Lucerne; Uri; Zug; Unterwalden

Commanders and leaders
(Note: Andreas Billius 1402–1431 (+1435) cites Carmagnola and Angelo [della Pergola] as commanders of the cavalry and Zenone [di Capo d'Istria] and [Piacentino] Brescia as commanders of the infantry link text p. 142); Carmagnola; Angelo della Pergola	(Note: Heinrich Bullinger (1573) maintains that Lucerne had to impose a tax to ransom its prisoners, among whom was Ulrich Walker, Schultheiss and Hauptmann of Lucerne, who faced a trial after his release link text p. 101. The Landammann of Uri Johannes Rodt link text p. 257, the Landammann and knight banneret of Zug Peter Kolin and the Landammann and knight banneret of Unterwalden Bartholome Zinderist link text pp. 112–113 were all killed in the battle.); Ulrich Walker (POW); Johannes Rodt †; Peter Kolin †; Bartholome Zinderist †

Strength
8,000-16,000 (Note: Bartolomeo Morone (1392–1461) maintains that Carmagnola and Angelo della Pergola moved to Bellinzona with 16,000 men (might include campfollowers) including 4–5,000 cavalry. An account of the fortress-governor of Bellinzona, from 27. November 1478, however maintains that the total strength of Carmagnola and Angelo della Pergola was 4,000 cavalry and 4,000 infantry, including 500 Genoese crossbowmen. link text p. 54)	8,000 (Note: Both Andreas Billius (+1435) text link p. 142 and Flavius Blondus (1392–1463) text link p. 400 maintain that the Swiss mustered 8,000 men (might include campfollowers) but that around half rushed ahead by a day to plunder the valleys, and what is known from the White Book of Sarnen text link pp. 69–71 together with the Chronik der Stadt Zürich 1420–1477 link text p. 189 and the Rötteler Chronik link text pp. 179–180 is that indeed on the day of battle the continingent of Zug arrived later on the battlefield while that of Schwyz was still behind and never arrived. The Rötteler Chronik does however describe the mobilisation of Uri, Lucerne, Unterwalden and Zug as "very strong".)

Casualties and losses
heavy ~900 killed (Note: The Luzerner Bürgerbuch, Anno domini mccccxxii, link text describes the Milanese killed in the battle as ...ob nunhundert... around 900); 400 horses killed	heavy ~400 killed (Note: The Chronik of Zürich mentions ~400 Swiss killed in the battle. The Luzerner Bürgerbuch, Anno domini mccccxxii, link text lists 368 killed while Brennwald link text p. 499 and Bullinger list 375 killed) all baggage and 1,200 sumpters lost

The Battle of Arbedo was fought on 30 June 1422 between the Duchy of Milan and the Swiss Confederation, and ended with a Milanese victory.

In 1419, the Swiss cantons of Uri and Unterwalden bought the fortified town of Bellinzona from the House of Sax but were unable to defend it adequately. When they rejected a Milanese proposal to purchase Bellinzona in 1422, a Milanese force under the command of the condottiero Francesco Bussone da Carmagnola attacked and defeated the Swiss garrison and occupied the town. A Swiss attempt to recapture Bellinzona with the support of other cantons including Lucerne and Zug led to the battle at the village of Arbedo, 3 km (1.9 mi) north of the town.

The Swiss were mainly equipped with halberds and were initially successful in repelling two Milanese cavalry charges. Carmagnola then brought up his crossbowmen on the Swiss flanks and ordered his men-at-arms to dismount and fight on foot with their lances, which outreached the halberds.

The Milanese forced the Swiss back onto a nearby hill, but the appearance of a band of foragers, whom the Milanese mistakenly thought were reinforcements, saved the Swiss from total defeat. When the Milanese force pulled back to reform, the Swiss withdrew from the battlefield, both sides having taken heavy casualties.

In a historiographical tradition of Zug, the bearer of the cantonal banner, Peter Kälin, was slain, and the banner was taken up by his son, who was slain in his turn. The banner was saved by one Hans Landwing, and was later lost against the French.

The victory secured Bellinzona and the Leventina for the Duchy. In addition, the Duchy regained the Val d'Ossola, thus the Swiss lost all their territorial gains. The defeat discouraged Swiss expansion towards Lake Maggiore for a long time. However, it was this defeat at Arbedo that led to the Swiss increasing the number of pikemen in their armies.

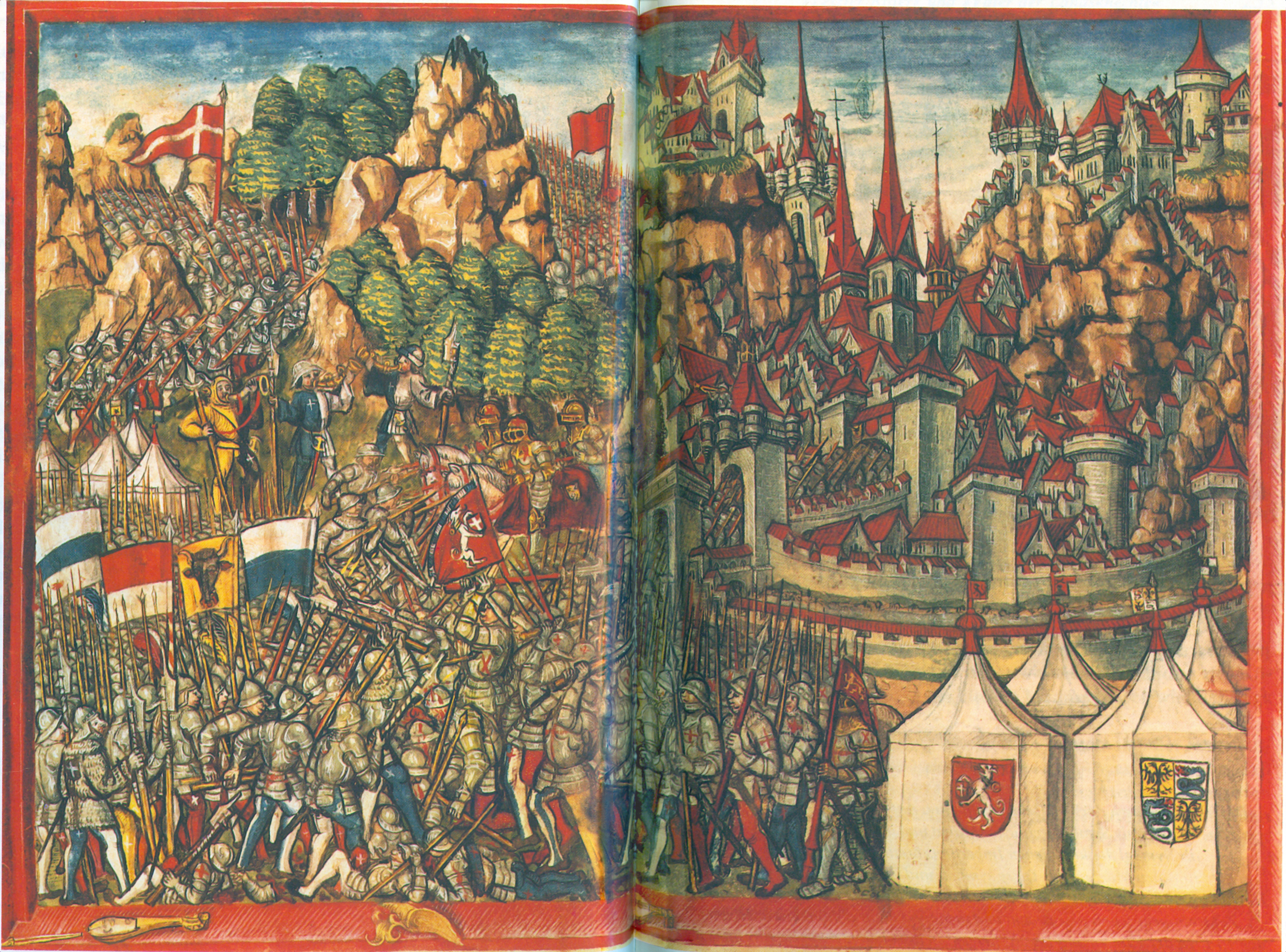
Battle of Arbedo (1422) in the depiction of the Lucerne chronicle (1513)

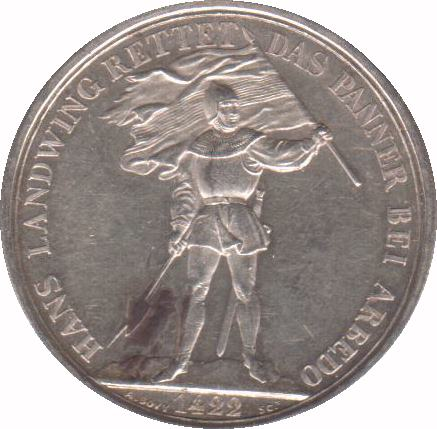
The shooting thaler of the 1867 federal Schützenfest depicts Hans Landwing saving the cantonal banner

== See also ==
- Battles of the Old Swiss Confederacy

== Sources ==
- White Book of Sarnen
- Rötteler Chronik
- Luzerner Bürgerbuch, 1191-1489
- Chronik der Stadt Zürich, 1290-1477
- Tigurinerchronik, 1573
- Historia Fratris Andreae Billii, 1402-1432
- Historiarum ab Inclinatione Romanorum, 1483 (Flavio Biondo 1392-1463)
