= Shooting thaler =

Swiss Coin

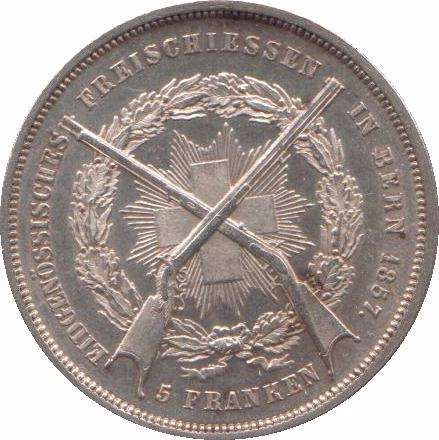
Reverse side of the Schützentaler issued for the 1857 federal festival in Bern, designed by Ferdinand Korn: Two muskets in saltire in front of the Swiss cross in splendour, laurel wreath, denomination "5 francs", legend "federal free-shooting in Bern, 1857".

A shooting thaler (/ˈtɑːlər/ TAH-lər; German: Schützentaler; French: Écu de tir) is a silver coin in thaler size minted to commemorate a Schützenfest (French: Fête de tir) or free shooting (German: Freischiessen, French: Tir libre) in Switzerland.

In a narrow sense, Swiss Schützentaler are the silver coins equal in size and weight to the Swiss 5 francs coin minted on the occasion of one of the Eidgenössische Schützenfeste, or federal shooting festivals. Two such coins were issued by the cantonal mints of Graubünden (1842, denominated at 4 Swiss francs), and Glarus (1847, denominated at 40 Batzen) prior to the establishment of the Federal Mint. Sometimes included as "shooting thaler" is a double thaler (10 francs) coin minted by Geneva and donated as cash prizes to the 1851 festival.

The Federal Mint has issued fifteen such coins with the nominal value of five francs, between 1855 and 1885. These coins were not intended as legal tender, even though they were issued by the federal mint with a nominal face value. Because they were minted to the official specifications of the 5 francs coin, they were nevertheless circulated de facto. After 1885, the federal mint was dissuaded from minting these semi-official coins on the part of the Latin Monetary Union. After the demise of the Monetary Union, the Swiss federal mint issued two further Schützentaler, in 1934 and 1939, for a total of twenty distinct Schützentaler (3 cantonal, 17 federal). Of the 22 cantons of the Swiss Confederation, 18 are represented in these coins, the exceptions being Uri, Appenzell, Aargau and Valais.

Most of the designs in the series depict strongly patriotic themes, frequently depicting the federal personification Helvetia alongside a cantonal or city personification, in some cases alluding to specific historical events. The entire series can be distinguished from the much more varied genre of shooting medals (Schützenmedaillen) by their adherence to the specifications of circulating coinage (with the exception of the three cantonal specimens, the Swiss 5 francs coin). All but the Stans (1861) and St. Gallen (1874) issues are denominated.

The term Schützentaler has been revived for commercially produced commemorative coins of thaler size offered on the collector's market since the 1980s.

== History ==
The first shooting medals were struck in honor of the Officers' Shoot held in Langenthal, Bern, in 1822. Shooting medals continued to be made in great numbers, minted in a variety of metals, including silver, bronze, gold and white metal.

The first shooting thalers were cantonal pieces, minted in the 1840s by Grisons and Glarus as sovereign cantons of the Restored Confederacy. These two thalers were strictly legal tender, issued under the same conditions as other circulating coins of the period.

For the 1851 festival, Geneva, already as a canton of the Swiss Confederation but before the federal mint had become fully operational, issued a 10 francs piece. This is sometimes included as a "shooting thaler", even though the shooting festival is in no way alluded to in the coin design. The Geneva issue of 1851, with a mintage of only 1,000 pieces, is the rarest of the shooting thalers, and has consequently attained the highest collector's value, selling for upward of CHF 1,500.

All nineteenth-century federal shooting thaler issues were minted to legal fineness, and were given the denomination of five francs. But from 1865, Switzerland was a member of the Latin Monetary Union, and since the shooting thalers were not included in the mintages authorized by the Union, they are considered semi-medallic, and not technically legal tender even though they did circulate de facto, and their circulation was tolerated by the federal authorities. The classification of the federally issued shooting thalers as circulating currency was discussed controversially in the late 19th century. Haas (1893) argues for their recognition as such. He cites the fact that for three decades, these coins were circulated de facto without intervention on the part of the federal authority. In addition, the 1855 thaler was minted as a regular 5 francs coin with the only exception of the shooting festival being mentioned in the inscription on the coin's edge.

The last thaler of this series is the 1885 Bern issue. After this time, Switzerland was dissuaded from further issuing these semi-official coins by the Latin Monetary Union.

Although the term Schützentaler is mostly reserved for the Swiss tradition, some German mints in the 19th century have also issued commemorative coins for Schützenfeste. Examples include the German States of Baden, Bremen, Frankfurt am Main and Hanover,

In 1927, the Monetary Union ceased to exist. Mintage began on a new series of shooting thalers in 1934 in honor of the shooting festival in Fribourg, and another design was issued in 1939 for the Lucerne festival. The 1934 issue was the last official shooting thaler that matched the circulating counterpart in both diameter and weight. The 1939 issues were not the same size and weight as their circulating counterparts, but both issues were redeemable only at the shooting festival or participating businesses. The federal festival, and with it the production of shooting thalers, was interrupted by the outbreak of World War II.

For the federal festivals of 1949 to 1977, commemorative coins were made but not to official specifications. With the rising popularity of collecting commemorative coins in the 1980s, fine silver coins dubbed Schützentaler have been privately issued for cantonal and federal festivals.

== Cantonal issues ==
=== Chur (1842) ===
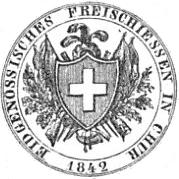
Obverse

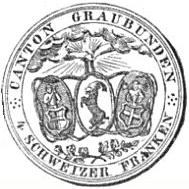
Reverse

- Year: 1842
- Location: Chur
- Denomination: 4 francs
- Designer(s): Karl Friedrich Voigt
- Diameter: 40 mm (1.57 in)
- Coinage metal: Silver
- Mintage: 6,000
- Notes: 1,744 pieces melted in 1852, for an upper limit of 4,256 surviving pieces. White metal and zinc pieces are known to have been struck. The zinc pieces were allegedly fixed in the center of a target during the shooting festival. If hit, the shooter would be given a larger award.

Chur specifications
	Details	Translation
Obverse	EIDGENÖSSISCHES FREISCHIESSEN IN CHUR – 1842	Federal Free Shoot in Chur – 1842
Reverse	CANTON GRAUBÜNDEN – 4 SCHWEIZER FRANKEN	Canton of Graubünden – 4 Swiss francs
Edge	EINTRACHT MACHT STARK	Harmony is strength

=== Glarus (1847) ===
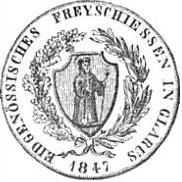
Obverse

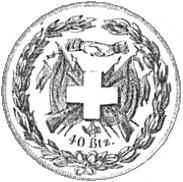
Reverse

- Year: 1847
- Location: Glarus
- Denomination: 40 batzen
- Designer(s): S. Burger, Karl Friedrich Voigt
- Diameter: 40 mm (1.57 in)
- Coinage metal: Silver
- Mintage: 3,200
- Notes: 1,023 pieces melted in 1852, for an upper limit of 2,177 surviving pieces. White metal and zinc pieces are known to have been struck. The zinc pieces were allegedly fixed in the center of a target during the shooting festival. If hit, the shooter would be given a larger award.

Glarus specifications
	Details	Translation
Obverse	EIDGENÖSSISCHES FREYSCHIESSEN IN GLARUS – 1847	Federal Free Shoot in Glarus – 1847
Reverse	40 Btz.	40 batzen
Edge	EINTRACHT MACHT STARK	Harmony is strength

=== Geneva (1851) ===
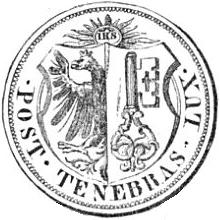
Obverse

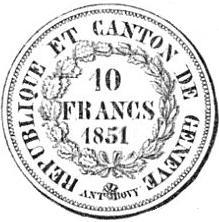
Reverse

- Year: 1851
- Location: Geneva
- Denomination: 10 francs
- Designer(s): Antoine Bovy
- Diameter: 48 mm (1.89 in)
- Coinage metal: Silver
- Mintage: 1,000
- Notes: These coins are not technically "shooting thalers", as the shooting festival is in no way mentioned or alluded to in the design. They are, rather, a batch of 1,000 double thaler (10 francs, 52 grams) coins minted by the canton of Geneva specifically as cash prizes that could be won at the festival.

Geneva specifications
	Details	Translation
Obverse	POST – TENEBRAS – LUX	Light after darkness
Reverse	REPUBLIC ET CANTON DE GENEVE – 10 FRANCS 1851	Republic and Canton of Geneva – 10 francs 1851
Edge	None	None

== Federal issues (1855–1885) ==
=== Solothurn (1855) ===
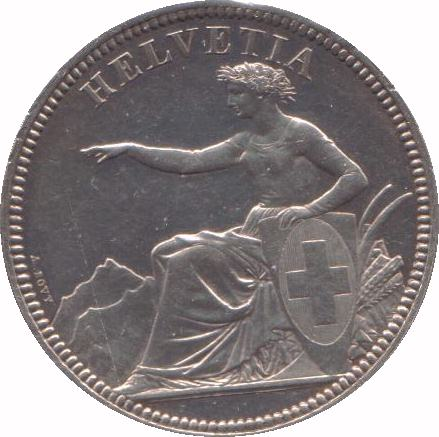
Obverse

- Year: 1855
- Location: Solothurn
- Denomination: 5 francs
- Designers: Friedrich Fisch, S. Burger, Karl Friedrich Voigt
- Diameter: 37 mm (1.46 in)
- Coinage metal: Silver
- Mintage: 3,000
- Design:
  Obv.: Seated figure of Helvetia, holding shield with the federal coat of arms, pointing left, with mountains and ears of corn, HELVETIA
  5 Fr. 1855, wreath of oak leaves and gentian
  Edge: EIDGEN. FREISCHIESEN SOLOTHURN 1855
- Notes: The design is identical to the regular federal 5 franc issues in use at the time, except for the inscription on the edge. Imitations (made from genuine 5 francs coins of 1850) were reported as early as 1890.

=== Bern (1857) ===
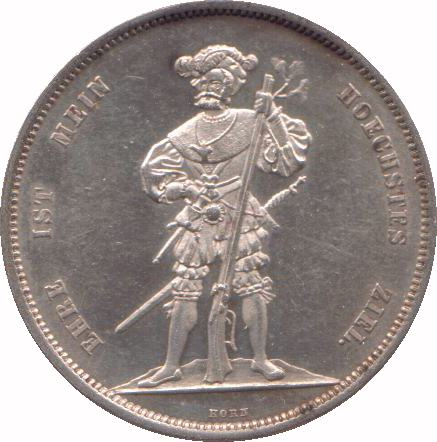
Obverse

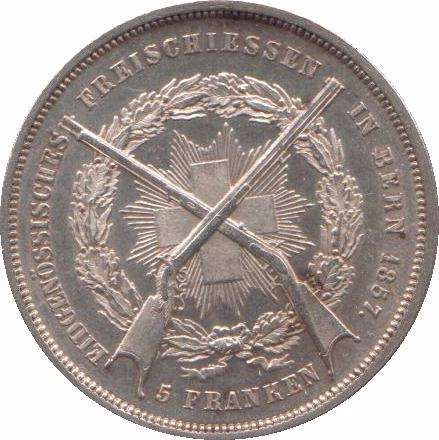
Reverse

- Year: 1857
- Location: Bern
- Denomination: 5 francs
- Designer(s): Ferdinand Korn
- Diameter: 37 mm (1.46 in)
- Coinage metal: Silver
- Mintage: 5,191
- Design:
  Obv.: Standing figure of a soldier with musket, EHRE IST MEIN HOECHSTES ZIEL. ("Honour is my highest aim"), signature KORN.
  Rev.: Two crossing rifles, Swiss cross in splendour in a wreath, 5 FRANKEN, EIDGENÖSSISCHES FREISCHIESSEN IN BERN 1857.
- Notes: Examples are known to have been struck in white metal. The only known "Class II" specimen of the 1804 dollar, now in the National Numismatic Collection, was struck over an 1857 shooting thaler.

=== Zürich (1859) ===
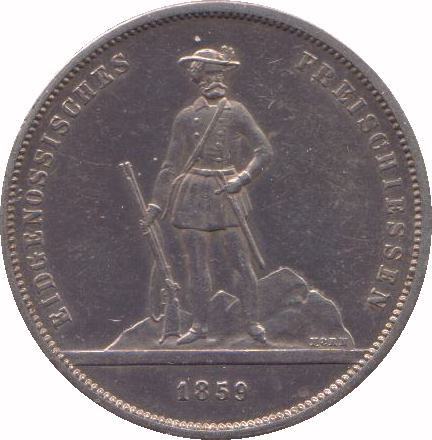
Obverse

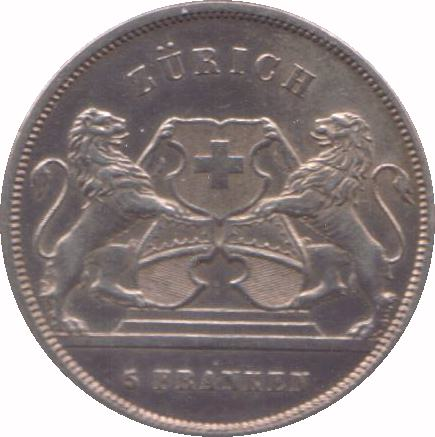
Reverse

- Year: 1859
- Location: Zürich
- Denomination: 5 francs
- Designer(s): Ferdinand Korn
- Diameter: 37 mm (1.46 in)
- Coinage metal: Silver
- Mintage: 6,000
- Design:
  Obv.: Standing figure of a soldier with rifle, EIDGENÖSSISCHES FREISCHIESSEN, 1859, signature KORN
  Rev.: Two cantonal coats of arms under a federal coat of arms, supported by two lions. ZÜRICH, 5 FRANKEN.

=== Nidwalden (1861) ===
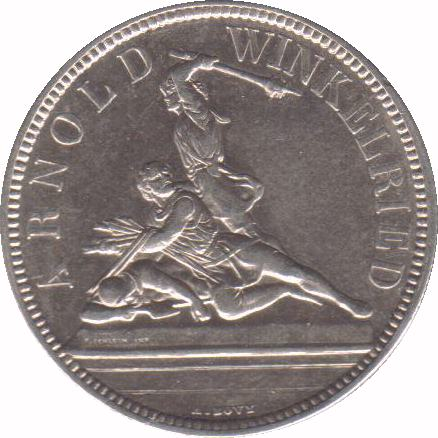
Obverse

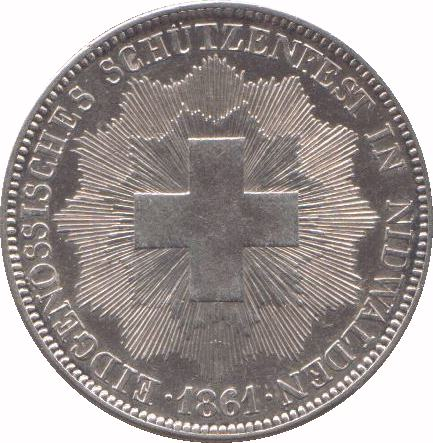
Reverse

- Year: 1861
- Location: Stans, Nidwalden
- Denomination: 5 francs
- Designer(s): Antoine Bovy, Ferdinand Schlöth
- Diameter: 37 mm (1.46 in)
- Coinage metal: Silver
- Mintage: 6,000
- Design:
  Obv.: The planned Winkelried monument in Stans, ARNOLD WINKELRIED, signature A. BOVY
  Rev.: Swiss cross in splendour, EIDGENÖSSISCHES SCHÜTZENFEST IN NIDWALDEN – 1861
- Notes: Essai pieces are known to have been struck in white metal.

=== La Chaux-de-Fonds (1863) ===
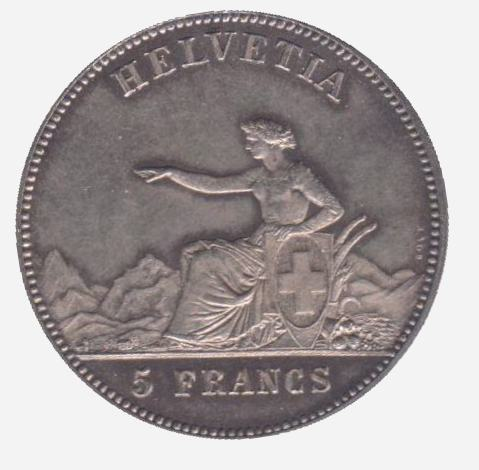
Obverse

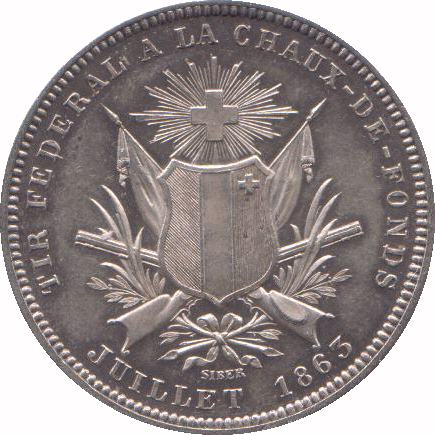
Reverse

- Year: 1863
- Location: La Chaux-de-Fonds, Neuchâtel
- Denomination: 5 francs
- Designer(s): Antoine Bovy, Jacob Siber
- Diameter: 37 mm (1.46 in)
- Coinage metal: Silver
- Mintage: 6,000
- Design:
  Obv.: Seated Helvetia figure, HELVETIA – 5 FRANCS
  Rev.: Neuchâtel cantonal coat of arms (the new coat of arms introduced after the 1857 Neuchâtel Crisis) with two rifles and two flags in saltire and a wreath, under a Swiss cross in splendour, TIR FEDERAL A LA CHAUX-DE-FONDS – JUILLET 1863, signature SIBER
- Notes: Examples are known to have been struck in white metal.

=== Schaffhausen (1865) ===
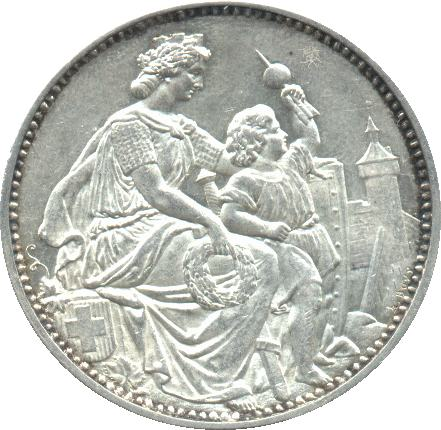
Obverse

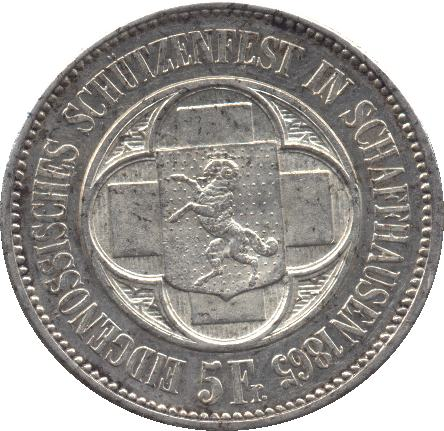
Reverse

- Year: 1865
- Location: Schaffhausen
- Denomination: 5 francs
- Designer: Antoine Bovy
- Diameter: 37 mm (1.46 in)
- Coinage metal: silver
- Mintage: 10,000
- Design:
  Obv.: The city personification seated, holding a wreath, with the federal coat of arms on the seat, the Munot tower in the background, her left hand resting on the shoulder of Tell's son holding the pierced apple.
  Rev.: The Schaffhausen coat of arms in front of a Swiss cross in a Gothic ornament, EIDGENÖSSISCHES SCHÜTZENFEST IN SCHAFFHAUSEN 1865 – 5 Fr., signature A. BOVY
- Notes: Two examples are known to have been struck in gold. There are forgeries in magnetic alloy.

=== Schwyz (1867) ===
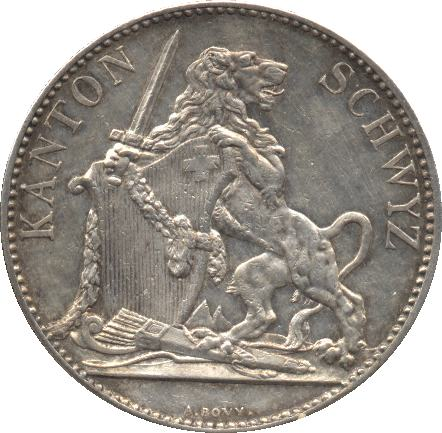
Obverse

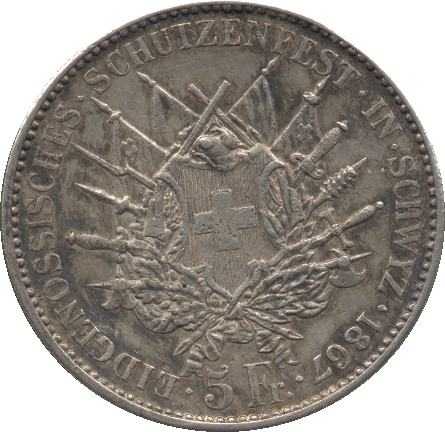
Reverse

- Year: 1867
- Location: Schwyz
- Denomination: 5 francs
- Designer: Antoine Bovy
- Diameter: 37 mm (1.46 in)
- Coinage metal: Silver
- Mintage: 8,000
- Design:
  Obv.: A lion rampant, holding a sword, supporting the cantonal shield. The lion's right back paw standing on a bow andquiver of arrows, the two Mythen peaks in the background, KANTON SCHWYZ, signature A. BOVY
  Rev.: A variety of weapons and four banners crossed behind the federal shield, wreath below, EIDGENÖSSISCHES SCHÜTZENFEST IN SCHWYZ 1867 – 5 Fr.

=== Zug (1869) ===
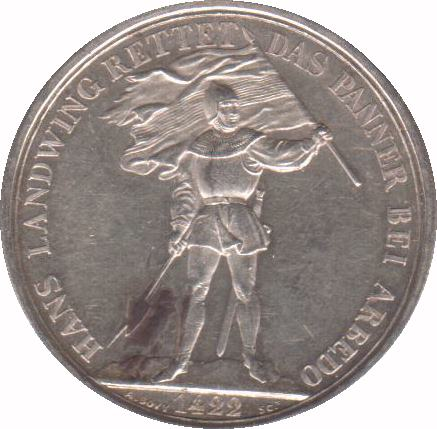
Obverse

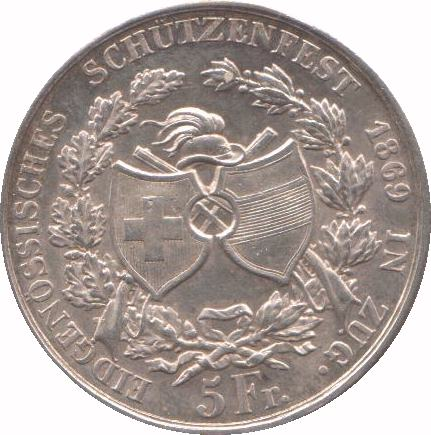
Reverse

- Year: 1869
- Location: Zug
- Denomination: 5 francs
- Designer: Antoine Bovy
- Diameter: 37 mm (1.46 in)
- Coinage metal: Silver
- Mintage: 6,000
- Design:
  Obv.: A medieval soldier with sword and half-armour, holding a halberd in his right hand, holding the cantonal banner in his left, HANS LANDWING RETTET DAS PANNER BEI ARBEDO ("Hans Landwing saves the banner at Arbedo"), 1422, signature A. BOVY SC.^{T}
  Rev.:Feathered cap over the federal and cantonal shields, superimposed over crossed rifles and a wreath of oak and laurel, EIDGENÖSSISCHES SCHÜTZENFEST 1869 IN ZUG. 5 Fr.
- Notes: Four examples are known to have been struck in gold.

=== Zürich (1872) ===
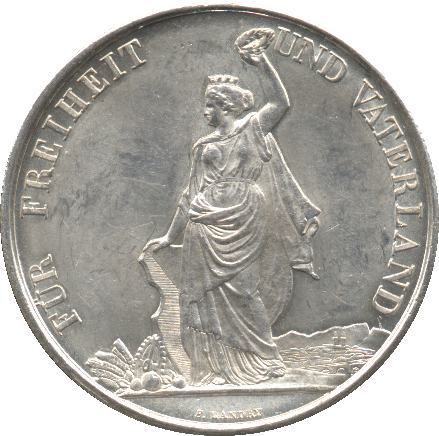
Obverse

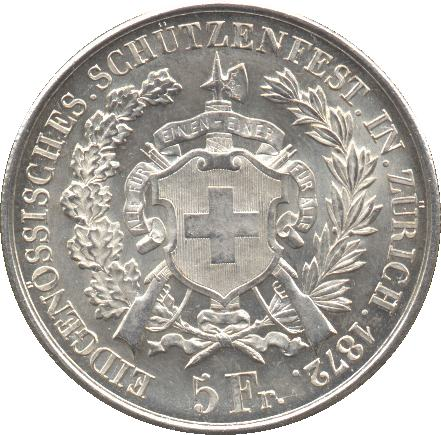
Reverse

- Year: 1872
- Location: Zürich
- Denomination: 5 francs
- Designer: Fritz Landry
- Diameter: 37 mm (1.46 in)
- Coinage metal: Silver
- Mintage: 10,000
- Design:
  Obv.: The city personification standing, resting her right arm on the Zürich shield, her left holding aloft a wreath, at her feet gears and crops and a view of the lake, FÜR FREIHEIT UND VATERLAND ("for liberty and fatherland"), signature F. LANDRY
  Rev.: The federal shield superimposed over a fasces and two crossed rifles, with the motto ALLE FÜR EINEN – EINER FÜR ALLE ("all for one, one for all"), surrounded by a wreath of oak and laurel, EIDGENÖSSISCHES. SCHÜTZENFEST. IN. ZÜRICH. 1872. 5 Fr.
- Notes: The obverse design was also used for shooting medals issued for the same festival.

=== St. Gallen (1874) ===
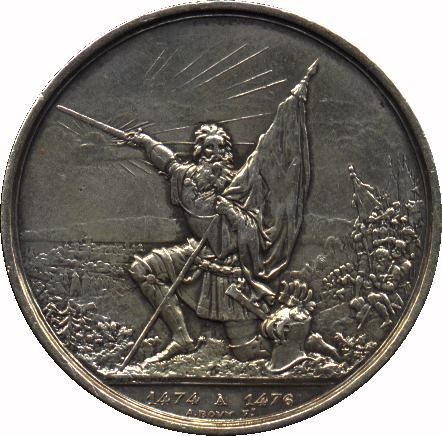
Obverse

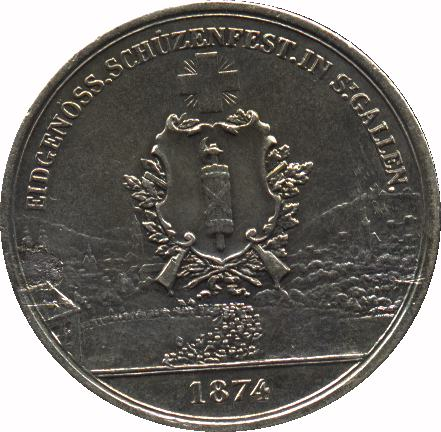
Reverse

- Year: 1874
- Location: St. Gallen
- Denomination: 5 francs
- Designers: Fritz Landry, Antoine Bovy
- Diameter: 37 mm (1.46 in)
- Coinage metal: Silver
- Mintage: 15,000
- Design:
  Obv.: Adrian von Bubenberg before the Battle of Murten: A kneeling knight, helmet deposited on the ground, holding the federal standard in his left, pointing with his sword to the left, in the background the rising Sun and the town of Murten, the Bernese troops shown on the right margin, 1474 A 1476, legend A. BOVY F.^{T}
  Rev.: Coat of arms of St. Gallen superimposed over crossed rifles and wreath of oak and laurel. Swiss cross above, city view behind, EIDGENÖSS. SCHÜTZENFEST IN S.^{T} GALLEN – 1874
- Notes: The scene references an episode before the battle: while the Bernese were in prayer, the sun burst from its cloud cover, and Bubenberg is said to have exclaimed "forth, brethren, God is illuminating our victory!". The same composition was used by Durussel for a tin medal commemorating the battle in the same year.

=== Lausanne (1876) ===
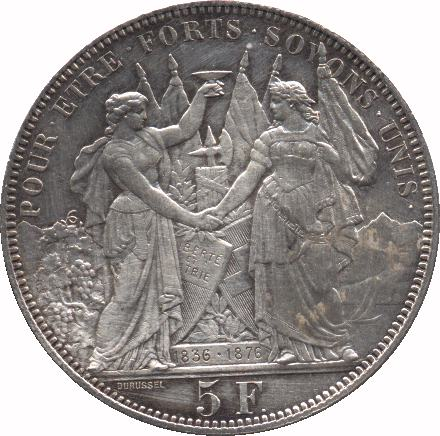
Obverse

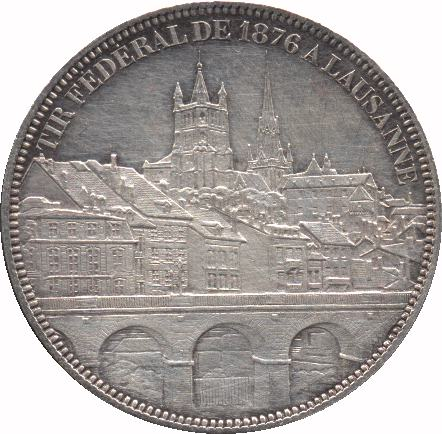
Reverse

- Year: 1876
- Location: Lausanne
- Denomination: 5 francs
- Designer: Edouard Durussel
- Diameter: 37 mm (1.46 in)
- Coinage metal: Silver
- Mintage: 20,000
- Design:
  Obv.: Helvetia and the personification of Vaud shaking hands, Vaud holding a wine goblet, cantonal and federal shields, flags and fasces in the background, flanked by grape vines and mountain scenery, 1836 · 1876 (1836 is the date of the first federal shooting festival in Lausanne), POUR · ETRE · FORTS SOYONS · UNIS · ("to be strong, let us be united"), 5 F, signature DURUSSEL
  Rev.: View of the city of Lausanne, TIR FÉDÉRAL DE 1876 LAUSANNE
- Notes: The reverse design was used on a shooting medal issued for the same festival.

=== Basel (1879) ===
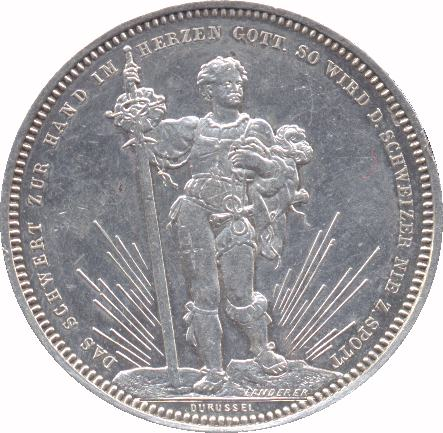
Obverse

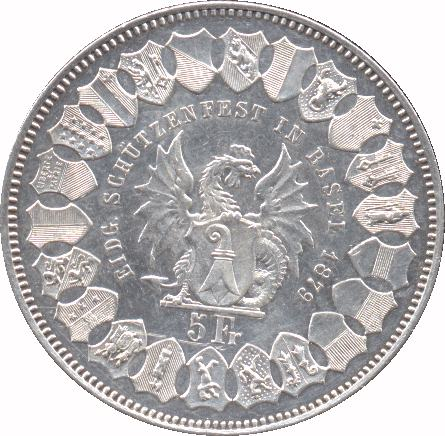
Reverse

- Year: 1879
- Location: Basel
- Denomination: 5 francs
- Designer: Edouard Durussel
- Diameter: 37 mm (1.46 in)
- Coinage metal: Silver
- Mintage: 30,000
- Design:
  Obv.: Standing Swiss soldier in Renaissance garb with Bidenhänder and Katzbalger, DAS SCHWERT ZUR HAND IM HERZEN GOTT SO WIRD D. SCHWEIZER NIE Z. SPOTT ("With sword in his hand and God in his heart, so will the Swiss never be disgraced"), signatures LANDERER, DURUSSEL.
  Rev.: Basel coat of arms supported by the basilisk in a circle of the 22 cantonal coats of arms, EIDG. SCHÜTZENFEST IN BASEL 1879, 5 Fr.
- Notes: Two varieties exist. One variety depicts rays between the sword and leg, while the other does not. Examples are known to have been struck in white metal.

=== Fribourg (1881) ===
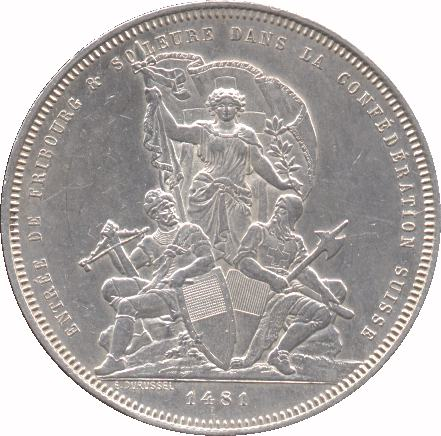
Obverse

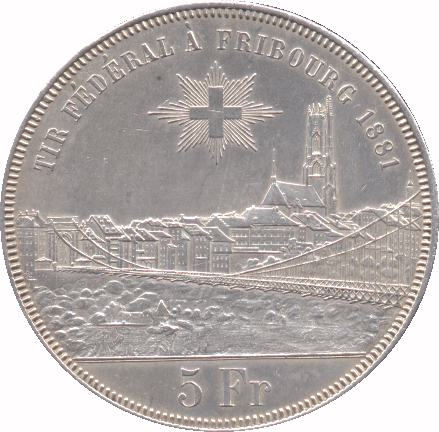
Reverse

- Year: 1881
- Location: Fribourg
- Denomination: 5 francs
- Designer: Edouard Durussel
- Diameter: 37 mm (1.46 in)
- Coinage metal: Silver
- Mintage: 30,000
- Design:
  Obv.: Two Swiss soldiers, one wielding a crossbow and the other a halberd, supporting Fribourg and Solothurn shields, respectively, seated at the feet of Helvetia holding the federal flag, ENTRÉE DE FRIBOURG & SOLEURE DANS LA CONFÉDÉRATION SUISSE 1481 ("Entry of Fribourg and Solothurn into the Swiss Confederation, 1481"), signature E. DURUSSEL.
  Rev.: Swiss cross in splendour above a city view of Fribourg, TIR FÉDÉRAL À FRIBOURG 1881, 5 Fr.

=== Lugano (1883) ===
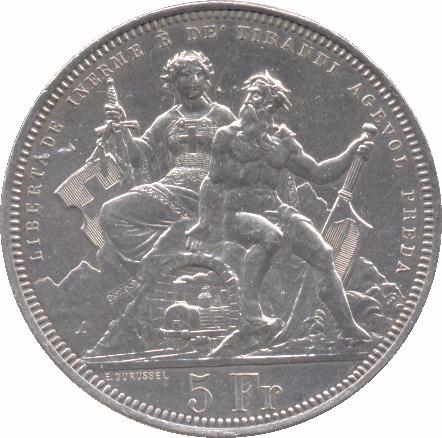
Obverse

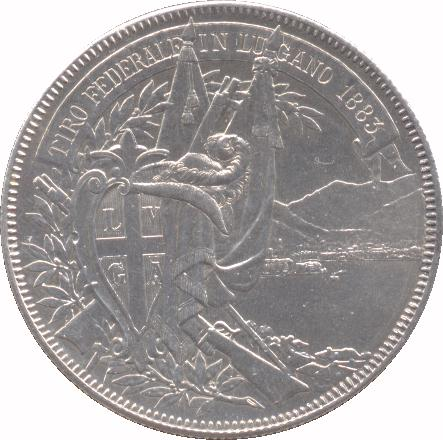
Reverse

- Year: 1883
- Location: Lugano
- Denomination: 5 francs
- Designer(s): Edouard Durussel
- Diameter: 37 mm (1.46 in)
- Coinage metal: Silver
- Mintage: 30,000
- Design:
  Obv.: Seated Helvetia with Ticino as river god, Helvetia is holding a sword and federal shield, Ticino an oar with cantonal colours, both are sitting on the Gotthard Tunnel (opened 1882), from which a locomotive is emerging, LIBERTADE INERME É DE' TIRANNI AGEVOL PREDA ("Defenseless liberty is easy prey for tyrants"), 5 Fr, signature E. DURUSSEL.
  Rev.: Shield of Lugano with Gothic ornaments, superimposed over two rifles, two banners and a laurel branch, a feathered cap and cloak resting on the shield, view of the lake and city on the right, TIRO FEDERALE IN LUGANO 1883.

=== Bern (1885) ===
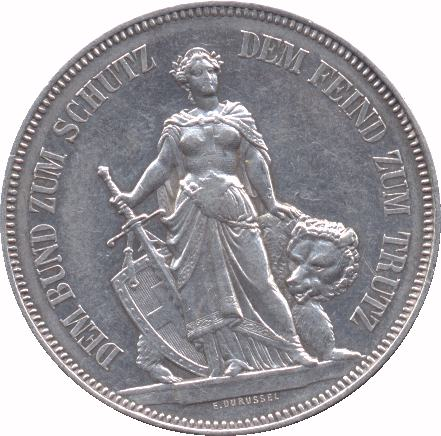
Obverse

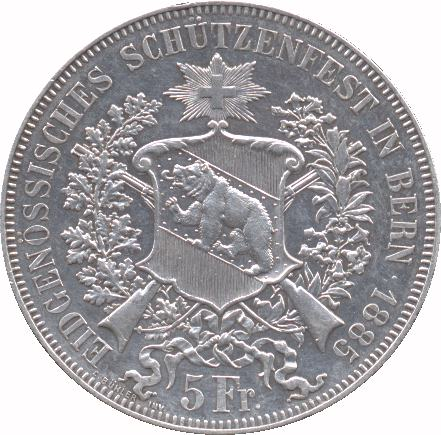
Reverse

- Year: 1885
- Location: Bern
- Denomination: 5 francs
- Designers: Edouard Durussel, Christian Bühler
- Diameter: 37 mm (1.46 in)
- Coinage metal: Silver
- Mintage: 25,000
- Design:
  Obv.: Standing Helvetia holding sword and federal shield, in front of the Bernese bear, her left hand resting on the bear's shoulder, DEM BUND ZUM SCHUTZ DEM FEIND ZUM TRUTZ ("To protect the federation, to defy the enemy"), signature E. DURUSSEL.
  Rev.: Bernese coat of arms superimposed over crossed rifles, wreath of oak leaves and gentian, Swiss cross in splendour above, EIDGENÖSSISCHES SCHÜTZENFEST IN BERN · 1885, 5 Fr., signature C. BÜHLER INV.
- Notes: Examples are known to have been struck in white metal.

== Federal issues (1934–1939) ==
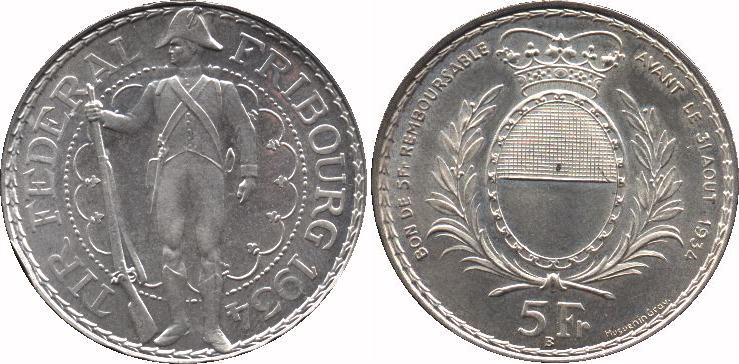
1934 Fribourg shooting thaler. Reverse legend reads: BON DE 5Fr REMBOURSABLE AVANT LE 31 AOUT 1934 (English: Good for five francs reimbursable before August 31, 1934)

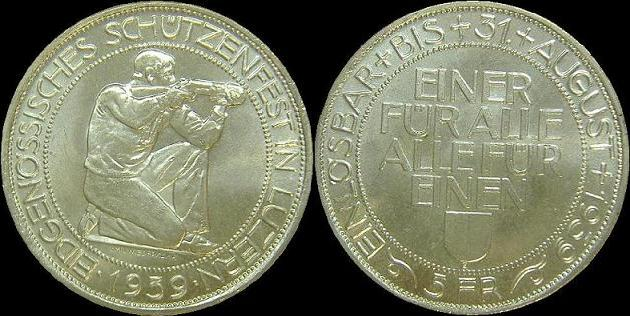
1939 Lucerne shooting thaler

The shooting thalers of 1934 and 1939 were the final two specimens issued by the Swiss federal mint. They did have the traditional denomination of 5 francs, but with the added instruction that the coins were only redeemable for this amount at the festival itself. The 1934 coin had the legend Bon de 5 Fr. remboursable avant le 31 août 1934 ("voucher for 5 francs redeemable before 31 August 1934") and the 1939 one had Einlösbar bis 31. August 1939 ("redeemable until 31 August 1939).

They are minted to the new specification for 5 franc coins, reduced from 37 mm, 25 grams Ag 90% (22.5 g fine silver) to 31 mm, 15 grams Ag 83.5% (12.525 g fine silver), and thus no longer of "thaler" size.

Location	Date	Denomination	Coinage metal	Mintage	KM number	Haberling number
Fribourg	1934	5 francs	Silver	40,650	S18	H20a
Fribourg	1934	100 francs	Gold	2,000	S19	H21
Lucerne	1939	5 francs	Silver	40,000	S20	H22
Lucerne	1939	100 francs	Gold	6,000	S21	H23

== Medals ==
=== Medals (1829–1853) ===
No medals were struck to commemorate the first modern Eidgenössische Schützenfest in 1824. Likewise, there is no medal from the second festival in 1827, and only shooting tokens (jetons) but no actual medals from the third in 1828. The first silver medal made for a federal shooting festival was issued for the fourth festival of 1829, in Fribourg, as a shooting prize. For the fifth festival in Bern, in 1830, a purely commemorative silver medal was made. After this, there is again a gap of a full decade, interrupted only by a lead prize medal sponsored by the town of Ragaz for the 1838 festival in St. Gallen. The eleventh festival, Chur 1842, was the first for which there is a cantonal issue shooting thaler. For 1844, in Basel, there was again a commemorative silver medal. The 1849 festival in Aarau issued a commemorative medal, strictly not for the current festival but commemorative of the first festival 25 years before. This was followed by another commemorative medal for the 1853 festival in Lucerne, the final such medal predating the introduction of federal issue shooting thalers in 1855.

The silver medals of 1830 and 1844 are thus the first commemorative silver medals for federal festivals. Of these two medals, numerous copies were made around 1890. It is unclear whether these were forgeries intended to deceive or if they were openly sold as copies at the time, but in either case, they have no distinguishing marks and are difficult to tell from the originals.

Location	Date	Design	Size	Weight	Richter nr.
Fribourg	1829	Fribourg coat of arms, CANTON FREYBURG; EIDGENÖSSISCHES EHR UND FREYSCHIESSEN, EHRENGABE 1829.		20.8 g	400
Bern	1830	Rifle pyramid with flag and fasces, ALLE NACH EINEM ZIELE ("All towards one aim"); Z. ANDENKEN A.D.EIDSG.FREYSCHIESSEN IN BERN V. 12-17 JUL.1830 ("For the commemoration of the 5th federal free shooting in Bern, 12 to 17 July 1830"), oak wreath, IMMER BEREIT ("ever ready"); by Nicholas Friedrich Rütimeyer	28.3 mm	10.1 g	179a
St. Gallen	1838	Swiss cross, ZUM EIDG. FREISCHIESSEN IN ST.GALLEN 1838; wreath, EHRENGABE VON RAGAZ	51 mm	116.6 g (Pb)	
Basel	1844	EIDGENÖSSISCHES FREISCHIESSEN 1844 ZU BASEL, dying soldier in harness with broken sword and shield, holding up a flag, ST:IACOB AN DER BIRS 26 AUGUST 1444. (Battle of St. Jakob an der Birs) A BOVY•SC; coats of arms of the Eight Cantons in roundels, ''DER SCHILD ZERBROCHEN, DAS SCHWERT ENTZWEI, DAS BANNER IN STERBENDER HAND. TRIUMPH DAS VATERLAND BLEIBT FREI, GOTT SEGNE DAS VATERLAND. ("Shield shattered, sword broken, banner held in dying hand / Triumph, the Fatherland remains free, God bless the Fatherland.")	38 mm	26.6 g	87b
Aarau	1849	City coat of arms, reclining allegory of commerce or industry, KUNST UND FLEISS, DES FRIEDENS PREIS. CANTON AARGAU 1803 ("Art and industriousness, the price of peace") A.BOVY FECIT; cantonal coat of arms, Swiss cross with clouds and rays, wreath of laurel and oak, 25 JÄHRIGE JUBELFEIER DES EIDG. SCHÜTZENFESTES AARAU 1849 ("Celebration of the 25th anniversary of the federal shooting festival [of 1824] in Aarau, 1849").			1b
Lucerne	1853	The figure of Arnold Winkelried lying dead, grasping a bundle of pikes, floating above him an allegory of victory with wreath and liberty cap, DEM ARNOLD VON WINKELRIED DAS DANKBARE VATERLAND ("[dedicated] to Arnold von Winkelried [by] the grateful Fatherland"), I.B. FRENER (engraver Johann-Baptist Frener); Swiss cross in splendour, wreath of oak and laurel, SCHÜTZENFEST DER EIDGENOSSEN IN LUZERN 1853.	41 mm	30 g	

=== Medals (1887–1929) ===
Silver medals for the federal festivals of 1887–1929 are sometimes referred to as Schützentaler. Most of these were also minted in bronze and in gold. The medals of 1887 to 1901 were minted in full thaler size (or somewhat larger), with a diameter of 45 mm and a silver weight above 38 grams. Beginning in 1904, the medals became smaller, in 1924 reduced to 10 grams of silver (reflecting the silver hausse in the wake of the First World War).

Location	Date	Design	Size	Weight	Mintage	Richter nr.
Geneva	1887	obv. Musketeer in half-armour standing on the city ramparts, in front of a cannon and a shield with the city arms, city view in the background, TOUT POUR LA PATRIE, 1519·1526, 1584·1814; rev. federal arms upon the city blazon (imperial eagle, key of Peter, IHS Christogram), UN POUR TOUS, TOUS POUR UN, TIR FEDERAL A GENEVE 1887 (H. Bovy, C. Richard, E. Lossier)	45 mm		12 (Au)	
Frauenfeld	1890	obv. allegory of Helvetia shielding Thurgau, Frauenfeld Castle, date 1803; rev. Frauenfeld arms (Hugues Bovy)	45 mm	38.8 g		1250
Glarus	1892	obv.: soldier in Renaissance garb with halberd, his left resting on an oval shield with Glarus arms, oak leaves, panorama of Glarus in the background, FÜR EHR UND WEHR; rev.: rifle and laurel branch crossing behind cup trophy with Glarus arms, EIDGEN. SCHÜTZENFEST IN GLARUS 1892 (F. Homberg, Bern)	45 mm	43 g (Ag)	50 (Ag)	807
Glarus	1892	obv.: standing Helvetia with panoramic view of Glarus, GEDENKET DER THATEN EURER VAETER ("remember the deeds of your fathers"); rev.: Glarus coat of arms (Huguenin frères)	45 mm	38.8 g (Ag), 67.8 g (Au)	55 (Au)	808
Winterthur	1895	obv.: seated city personification extending a laurel branch, below a Swiss cross in splendour, panorama of the festival pavilion in the background; rev.: city view in a wreath, city coat of arms with laurel branches, a crossbow, busts of Liberty and Hermes, EIDGENÖSSISCHES SCHÜTZENFEST 1895 IN WINTERTHUR, H. W., G. H. (Georges Hantz, H. Wildermuth)	45 mm	38.6 g (Ag)		1756
Neuchâtel	1898	obv.: scene of a shooting range with five shooters; rev.: heraldic eagle with city coat of arms, oak branch, federal flag, city view, TIR FÉDÉRAL DE 1898 A NEUCHATEL (F. Landry)	45 mm	38.3 g (Ag)		970
Lucerne	1901	obv.: helmeted and armoured bust of Helvetia in profile with flowing hair and a branch of gentian adorning the helmet, view of Lake Lucerne with Tell's chapel in the background; rev.: Lucerne arms with laurel branch imposed over Swiss cross, EIDGENOESSISCHES SCHVETZENFEST 1901 (Hans Frei, Basel)	45 mm	36 g (Ag)		879
St. Gallen	1904	obv.: Shooter with Schmidt–Rubin model 1896 rifle, oak tree, city view in the background, S^{T} GALLEN 1904, H. Huguenin; rev.: Helvetia standing on a rocky slope holding the federal flag, pointing right, with an infantry rifleman in the background, St. Gallen coat of arms and Swiss cross engraved in the rockface, EIDGENOSSISCHES SCHUTZENFEST, H. Huguenin, Huguenin Frs. (Huguenin frères)	33 mm	16 g	4,759 (Ag)	1175
Zürich	1907	obv.: Helvetia with edelweiss wreath and city personification in profile; rev.: laurel branch, EIDGENOESSISCHES SCHUETZENFEST IN ZUERICH 1907 (Bosch, Huguenin)		10.4 g (Ag), 15.2 g (Au)	400 (Au)	1793
Bern	1910	obv.: bust of woman in Bernese Tracht, 1910 Bern, Holy fr.s; rev. federal arms supported by a bear, Zytglogge tower, EIDGENOESSISCHES SCHUETZENFEST, HOLY FRS		14g (Ag) 13.3 g (Au)		263
Aarau	1924	obv.: kneeling William Tell, „DU KENNST DEN SCHÜTZEN“ ("Thou know'st the marksman"); rev.: heraldic eagle haloed with Swiss cross, EIDG·SCHÜTZENFEST·AARAU·1924. Variant (Richter 44) has the additional inscription DEN MITARBEITERN GEWIDMET on the reverse.		10 g (Au), 12.6 g (Ag)	223 (Au)	43, 44
Aarau	1924	obv.: Two men standing, rifles in their left hands, shaking hands, Swiss cross in square field of rays, AARAU 1824 1924; rev.: JAHR=HVNDERTFEIER DES SCHWEIZ. SCHV̈TZENVEREINS (Hans Frei, J. Schwyzer)	50 mm	60 g (bronze)		45
Bellinzona	1929	obv. a girl sitting on a rock; rev. a triple fountain representing Rhone, Ticino and Rhine (RODANO, TICINO, RENO), TIRO FEDERALE - BELLINZONA 1924 (Huguenin / Ballestra)	27 mm	13 g	2,500	1467

=== Medals (1949–1990) ===
The federal festivals had commemorative medals minted in silver and gold. These do not have a face value in francs and are typically called Schützenmedaille rather than Schützentaler.

The designs of the medals for the 1949 to 1979 festivals abandoned the classicist style of Romantic nationalism prevalent in the 19th to early 20th century thalers, and follow the artistic tastes of their time, tending towards minimalistic or postmodernist styles (a trend already perceptible in the modernized designs of the federal 1939 issue and one of the two variants made for the 1924 festival).

The 1949 medal was the last to be produced at the federal mint, still bearing the B mint mark and no fineness stamp, as it was still made at the 83.5% fineness of the 5 francs coins of the time. The medals of 1954 onward are made by Huguenin Frères (HF) and are marked with a 900/1000 fineness stamp.

Location	Date	Design	Mintage	Richter nr.
Chur	1949	kneeling shooter with rifle, EIDGENÖSSISCHES SCHÜTZENFEST CHUR 1949, EMIL WIEDERKEHR; rev.: Graubünden arms, SCHWEIZERISCHER SCHÜTZENVEREIN, 1824-1949, B		857
Lausanne	1954	Henri Guisan in profile, · HENRI GUISAN · GENERAL ·, IT RECTE · NIHIL TIMET, A. LASSERRE; rev. TIR FEDERAL LAVSANNE 1954 inscribed in an outlined cross, B, CR, 0.900 HF		1649
Biel	1958	obv.: three standing men, one sowing seeds, one holding a K31 rifle, one forging a horseshoe, the Biel coat of arms engraved on the base of the anvil, HUGUENIN JR; rev.: EIDG. SCHÜTZENFEST BIEL TIR FEDERAL BIENNE 1958, 0,900, HF (Huguenin)		
Zürich	1963	obv.: depiction of a Stgw. 57 rifle with muzzle pointing downward, EIDGENÖSSISCHESSCHÜTZENFESTZÜRICH1963, 0.900 HF; rev.: stylized heraldic lion supporting the Zürich arms, 1963, F. FISCHER		
Thun	1969	obv.: Eidg. Schützenfest Tir fédéral Thoune Tiro federale Thun , K.J., 0.900, HF; rev.: stylized depiction of Thun castle, Swiss cross in a Kelle (wand used to indicate shot placement), 1969, K. JACOBSEN		
Luzern	1979	obv.: kneeling figure of William Tell, Erni '78 (artist's signature), 900, +M; rev.: apple pierced by a crossbow bolt in front of a Swiss cross, 50. EIDGENÖSSISCHES SCHÜTZENFEST 1979 LUZERN (Hans Erni)		
Chur	1985	obv.: 85 Chur, Eidgenössisches Schützenfest, Tir fédéral, Tiro federale, Tir federal, 900 HF; rev.: city, cantonal and federal coats of arms, CUIRA, COIRE, COIRA, GRÖBLI (Carlo Gröbli)		
Winterthur	1990	obv.: range target with Kelle, WINTERTHUR 90, 900 HF, EIDG. SCHÜTZENFEST · TIR FEDERAL · TIRO FEDERALE · TIR FEDERAL; rev.: Winterthur church and city coat of arms		

=== CIT collector coins (1990 to present) ===
Beginning in 1982, commemorative medals in gold and silver have been produced for various local shooting events by the private company CIT "Coin Invest Trust" based in Balzers, Liechtenstein, in collaboration with Huguenin Frères (since 2002 named Faude & Huguenin SA) of Le Locle. The privately produced 1982 "Schützentaler" was offered in Platinum and Palladium alongside silver and saw "phenomenal" sales in the collectors' market especially in the United States. Encouraged by this success, CIT Coin Invest went on to produce yearly issues at least nominally associated with selected Swiss shooting events, and in designs loosely reminiscent of the aesthetics of the 19th-century Schützentaler. Their design for the 1984 Feldschiessen in Oberhasli features the seated 1850 Helvetia design by Friedrich Fisch and a depiction of the Wilhelm Tell monument by Richard Kissling (1895). The 1990 design for the Winterthur festival once again shows the embracing figures of Helvetia and the city personification, and crossed muskets with a laurel wreath, albeit in modernized, slightly cartoonish art style.

The same company has also offered "Schützentaler" for the federal shooting festival from 1990 onward. The 1990 festival still had a separate official commemorative coin in modern design, and the CIT coin was undenominated.

Since 1995, the organizers of the federal shooting festivals have adopted the CIT "shooting thalers" as official, and they have been denominated with CHF 50 (silver) and CHF 500 (gold).

They are commemorative medals aimed at the collector's market, but they are marketed as "Schützentaler". Their design has returned to the patriotic themes of the 19th-century issues, and a nominal face-value in Swiss Francs was re-introduced. These denominations are fictional and not related to any Swiss monetary authority. The legend convertible à la fête de tir / einlösbar am Schützenfest ("redeemable at the shooting festival") is engraved on the reverse, in imitation of the final federal issues of 1934 and 1939, so that they are technically tokens or vouchers that could be redeemed for the stated amount at the respective festivals. For the three coins issued 2010–2020, the reverse side of the coins remained unchanged, showing the coin denomination (Fr. 50 for silver, Fr. 500 for gold) in a wreath of oak and gentian and above two crossed muskets with a powder horn, and the legend convertible à la fête de tir / einlösbar am Schützenfest, and a fineness stamp HF (Huguenin), 900 for silver, 999 for gold.

Location	Date	Design	Denomination	Coinage metal	Mintage	KM number	Haberling number
Winterthur	1990	obv.: city personification and Helvetia standing, Winterthur holding a sword, Helvetia the federal shield; rev.: target in a laurel wreath, above crossed muskets.	—	Silver	5,000		H39a
Winterthur	1990	obv.: city personification and Helvetia standing, Winterthur holding a sword, Helvetia the federal shield; rev.: target in a laurel wreath, above crossed muskets.	—	Gold	400		H40a
Thun	1995	obv.: bust of Tell holding crossbow and bolt; rev.: K31, federal and Berne coas, panorama view.	50 francs	Silver	5,000	S46	H49a
Thun	1995	obv.: bust of Tell holding crossbow and bolt; rev.: K31, federal and Berne coas, panorama view.	500 francs	Gold	500	S47	H50
Bière	2000	obv.: Renaissance soldier with flamberg holding Vaud coa; rev.: Swiss cross, grape garlands, crossed muskets	50 francs	Silver	3,500	S59	H62
Bière	2000	obv.: Renaissance soldier with flamberg holding Vaud coa; rev.: Swiss cross, grape garlands, crossed muskets	500 francs	Gold	300	S60	H63a
Frauenfeld	2005	obv.: apple-shaped target; rev.: Frauenfeld castle, Frauenfeld coa.	—	Silver, Gold			
Aarau	2010	obv.: allegory holding a wreath, oak branch, resting on a shield with imperial eagle, cantonal coa as inescutcheon, standing in front of a reposing lion; rev. wreath, crossed muskets.	50 francs	Silver	2,000	S79	H83a
Aarau	2010	obv.: allegory holding a wreath, oak branch, resting on a shield with imperial eagle, cantonal coa as inescutcheon, standing in front of a reposing lion; rev. wreath, crossed muskets.	500 francs	Gold	200	S80	H84a
Valais	2015	obv. a shooter crowned with laurel by an allegory of victory; rev.: wreath, crossed muskets.	50 francs	Silver	1,200	-	H93a
Valais	2015	obv. a shooter crowned with laurel by an allegory of victory; rev.: wreath, crossed muskets.	500 francs	Gold	200	-	H94a
Lucerne	2020	obv.: Helvetia and Lucerne city personification with coas, Helvetia seated with a sword, Lucerne standing with a musket, a lion at the feet of Lucerne; rev. wreath, crossed muskets.	50 francs	Silver	1,000	-	
Lucerne	2020	obv.: Helvetia and Lucerne city personification with coas, Helvetia seated with a sword, Lucerne standing with a musket, a lion at the feet of Lucerne; rev. wreath, crossed muskets.	500 francs	Gold	125		

== See also ==
- Swiss franc
- Coins of the Swiss franc – Currently minted Swiss coins.

== Bibliography ==
- Bruce, Colin R. II Unusual World Coins Iola, Wisconsin: Krause Publications, 2007, ISBN 0-89689-576-9
- Krause, Chester L. & Mishler, Clifford Standard Catalog of World Coins 1801–1900, Krause Publications, 1996, ISBN 0-87341-427-6
- Krause, Delbert Ray Swiss Shooting Talers and Medals, Whitman Publishing Company, 1965
- Martin, Jean L. Les médailles de tir Suisse 1612–1939 Lausanne, 1972
- Richter, Jürg Die Schützentaler und Schützenmedaillen der Schweiz, 2005, ISBN 3-924861-95-1
- Haberling, Michael Swiss Shooting Festival Coins 1842 - 2015, 2015
