= Coins of the Swiss franc =

Official coins used in Switzerland and Liechtenstein

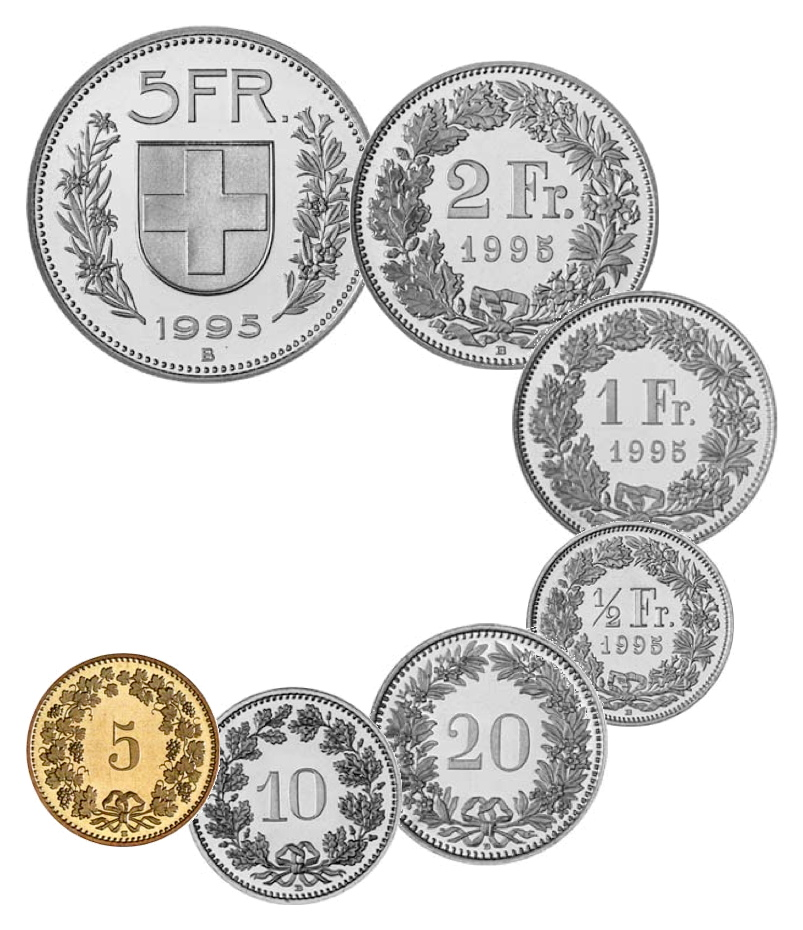
The current series of the Swiss franc coins (reverse faces)

The coins of the Swiss franc are the official coins used in Switzerland and Liechtenstein. The name of the subunit is centime in French and internationally, Rappen in German, centesimo in Italian, and rap in Romansh. There are coins in denominations of 5 centimes, 10 centimes, 20 centimes, 1/2 franc (50 centimes), 1 franc, 2 francs, and 5 francs.

All coins have the legend of either Helvetia or Confœderatio Helvetica, the Latin name of the Swiss Confederation, along with the year number. The 5, 10, and 20 centimes coins show a head of Liberty in profile, designed by Karl Schwenzer (1879). The 1/2, 1, and 2 francs coins show a standing figure of the national personification Helvetia, designed by Albert Walch (1860). The 5 francs coin on the obverse shows a portrait of an "alpine herdsman" (Alphirte), designed by Paul Burkhard (1922), and on the reverse the federal coat of arms; additionally it has the inscription Dominus Providebit embossed on the edge.

The original series of coins introduced in 1850 consisted of nine denominations. To this were added three denominations of gold coins, 10, 20, and 100 francs, between 1897 and 1925, following the standards of the Latin Monetary Union. The 1 and 2 centimes coins were retired from circulation in 2007 and 1978, respectively. The gold coins have never been officially retired, but they are not in circulation as their gold value far exceeds their denomination. Therefore, there remain seven different denominations in circulation, as listed above.

== History ==
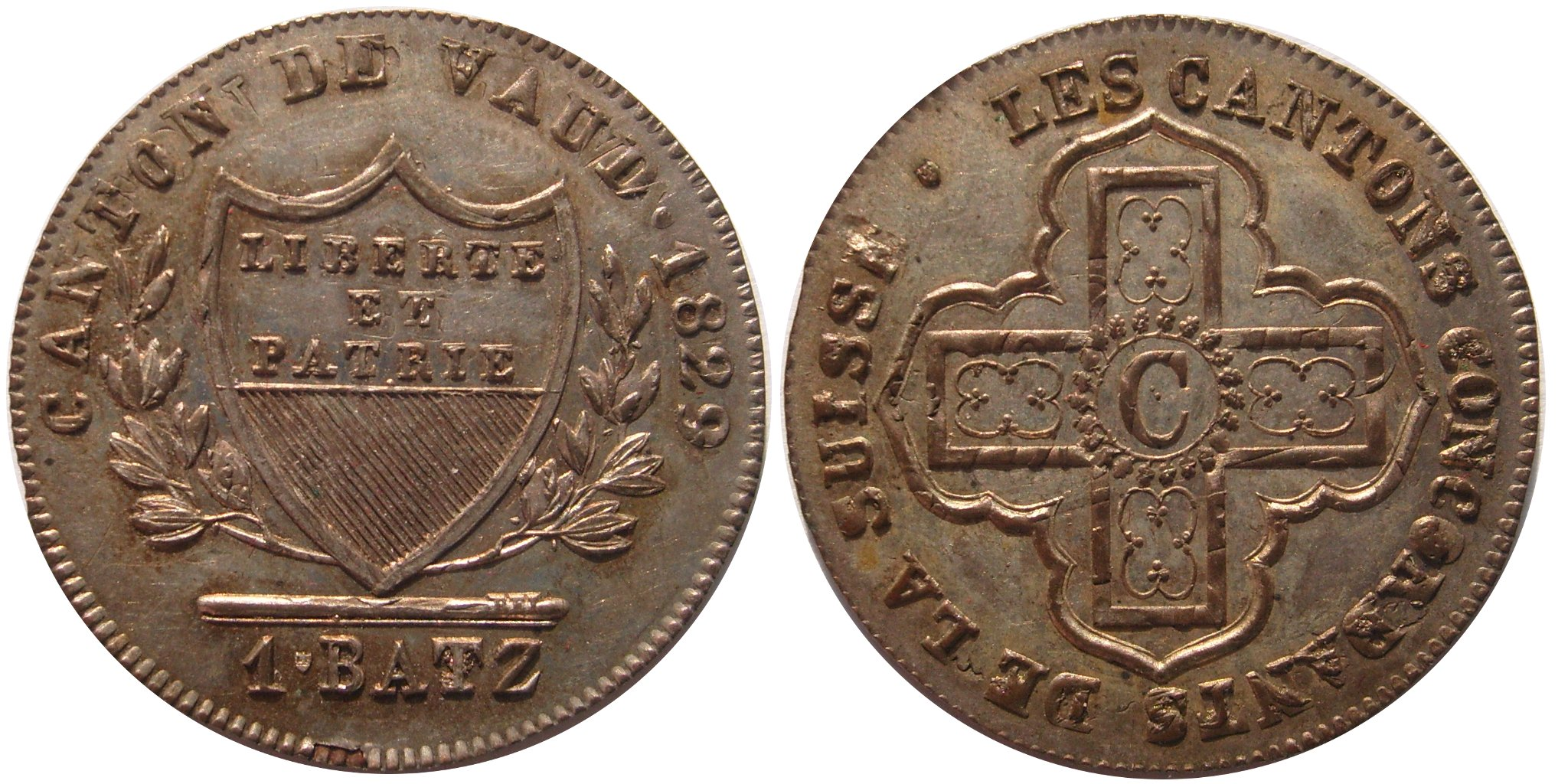
Konkordatsbatzen (Vaud 1829)

The name Swiss franc (German: Schweizer Franken, French: Franc suisse, Italian: Franco Svizzero) was given to a silver coin minted in Bern from 1757, and later also in Basel, Solothurn and Lucerne. The value of this coin was 10 Batzen. The name franc was taken from the colloquial name of the French livre tournois, since 1726 defined as 4.5 grams of fine silver.

In the Helvetic Republic, in 1799, there were plans to introduce a decimal currency system based on the Bernese currency, with a Swiss franc corresponding to 6.6149 grams of fine silver, equivalent to 10 Batzen or 100 Rappen. These coins were not minted due to a shortage of silver during the period of the Napoleonic Wars. During the Swiss Mediation period (1803–1814), Swiss currency reverted to a variety of cantonal francs. In the Restored Confederacy, from 1825, the western cantons (Bern, Basel, Fribourg, Solothurn, Aargau, Vaud) formed a "monetary concordate" (Münzkonkordat) for the unification of their currencies, producing a standardised Konkordatsbatzen.

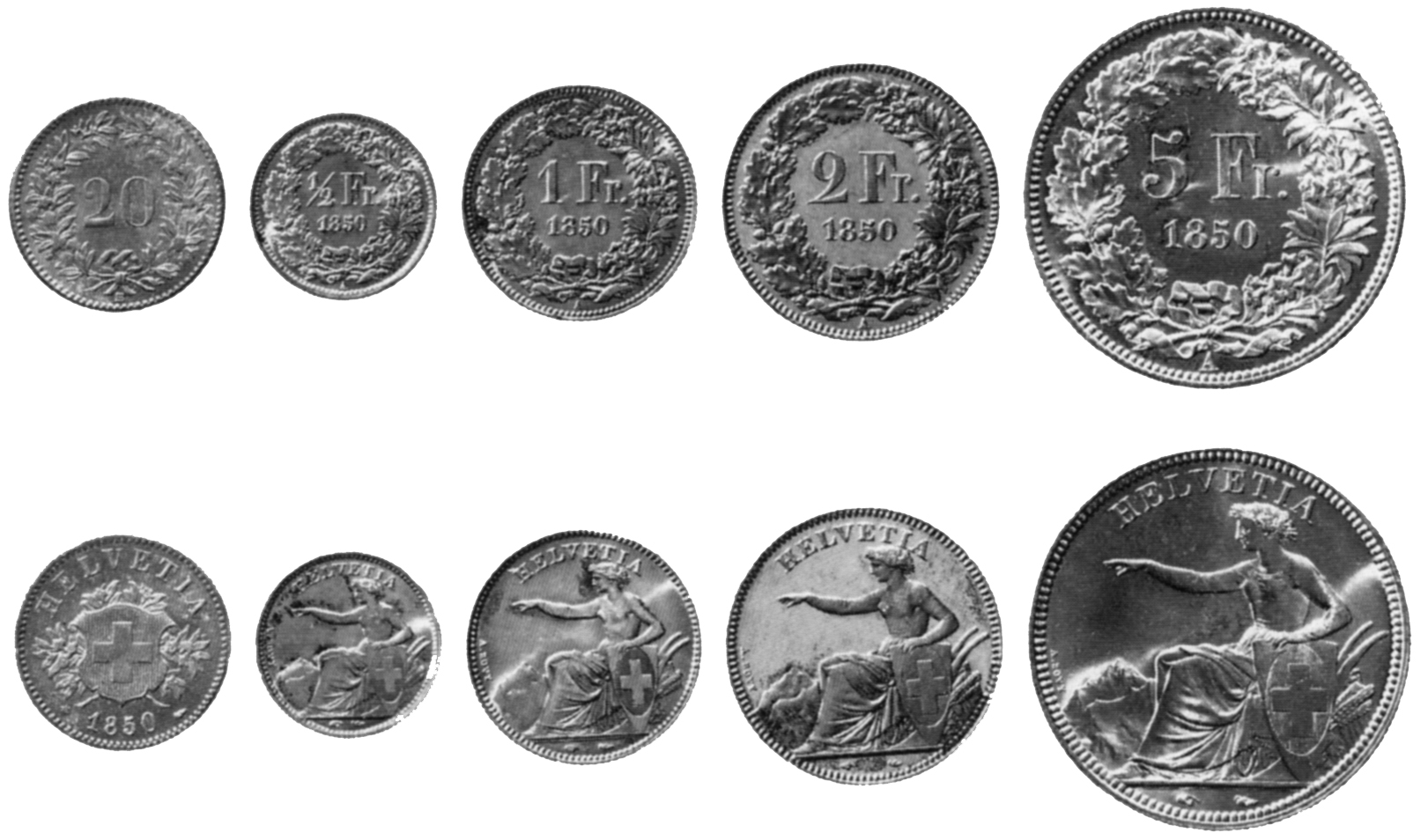
Series of coins of the 1850 batch

The modern Swiss franc was introduced in 1850, two years after the formation of Switzerland as a federal state. The federal law establishing the new currency was passed on 7 May 1850. For practical reasons, the Swiss franc was initially created as having parity with the French franc of the day (introduced 1795), with 1 franc equivalent to 5 grams of silver at 90% purity. The official exchange rate with the cantonal concordate currency was seven Batzen to one franc.

The first coins of the Swiss franc were minted in Paris, Brussels and Strasbourg, until the former cantonal mint of Bern was made ready to begin production as federal mint. The batch of coins produced in 1850 and 1851 was insufficient, and the Federal Council had to resort to authorising the circulation of French, Belgian and Italian coins. The first coins minted in Berne were issued in 1857. There was no federal paper money prior to 1907, with the establishment of the Swiss National Bank, although the cantons had the right to issue banknotes.

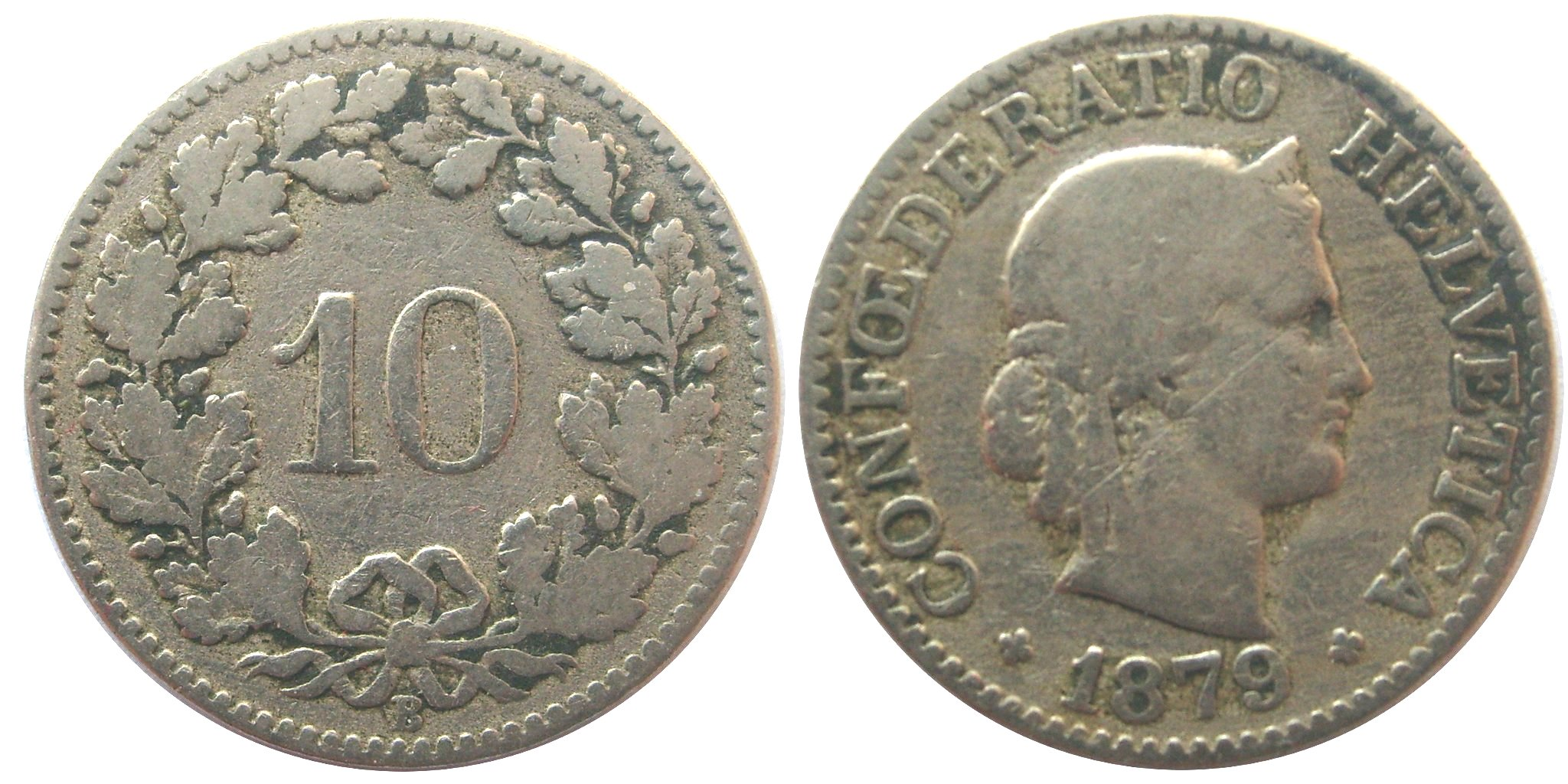
A ten-centimes/rappen coin from 1879. It holds the Guinness World Record for oldest original currency in circulation.

The design of the original 1850 coins was due to Alexander Hutter for the copper coins (realised by Jean-Jaques Barre of Paris), to Karl Friedrich Voigt of Munich (1800–1874) for the billon coins, and to Friedrich Fisch of Aarau for the silver coins (the "seated Helvetia" motif). Voigt's design for the reverse side, consisting of the coin value in wreaths of grapes, oak leaves and gentian, remains in use in the current coins, while his design of the federal coat of arms on the obverse was replaced in the 1870s.

The designs of the coins in current use, other than the 5 francs coin, are due Albert Walch (1816–1882). The original plates for the 1/2, 1 and 2 francs coins were cut by Geneva medalist Antoine Bovy (1795–1877) in 1874. The "head of Liberty" used on the 5, 10 and 20 centimes coins was realised by Württemberg medalist Karl Schwenzer (1843–1904) in 1879. The 5 francs coins of 1888–1918 were also realised by Schwenzer, based on a design by Christian Bühler of Bern, but the 5 francs coin as the only Swiss coin in current use was given a complete redesign in the 20th century, first used in the 1922 batch, based on a design of an "alpine herdsman" by Paul Burkhard of Richterswil (1888–1964).

Switzerland joined the Latin Monetary Union in 1865. The 5-franc coin of 90% silver was unlimited legal tender together with gold, while 2-, 1,- and 1/2-franc coins of 83.5% silver were made subsidiary or limited legal tender. The billon coins (5% to 15% silver) were also subsidiary; they were replaced by Cupronickel and Nickel in 1879. In 1918/19, there was experimentation with brass (Cu–Zn) versions of the 5 and 10 centimes coins, but these were again retired in 1924.

In 1968, the 83.5% silver coins were also replaced by Cupronickel, as the value of the silver in the alloy had exceeded its face value, and the silver coins were taken out of circulation in 1971. The 2 and 1 centime coins were taken out of circulation entirely in 1978 and 2007, respectively. The 5 centimes coin was switched to a yellow-metal (Aluminium bronze) alloy in 1981, and the white-metal (Cupronickel) 5 centimes coins of 1879–1980 were retired in 1984. The (magnetic) Nickel versions of the 20 centimes coin (1881–1938) were retired in 2004, leaving the 10 centimes coins of 1879 onwards as only 19th-century coins that remain in official circulation.

=== Bronze coins ===
- 1 centime: bronze (1.2g), replaced with zinc (1.5g) in 1942; designed by Alexander Hutter; obv: federal coat of arms with liberty cap and the legend Helvetia, rev: numeral 1 in a wreath. Minted again in bronze in 1948 (1.5g); redesigned by Josef Tannheimer; obv: Swiss cross with legend Helvetia, rev: numeral 1 and an ear of corn. Taken out of circulation in 2007.
- 2 centimes: bronze (2.5g), replaced with zinc (2.4g) in 1942; designed by Alexander Hutter; obv: Swiss coat of arms with liberty cap and the legend Helvetia, rev: numeral 2 in a wreath. Minted again in bronze in 1948 (3.0g); redesigned by Josef Tannheimer, obv: Swiss cross with legend Helvetia, rev: numeral 2 and an ear of corn. Taken out of circulation in 1978.

=== Billon coins ===
- 5 centimes: billon (5% silver, 1.67g); designed by Karl Friedrich Voigt; obv.: federal coat of arms with wheat ears and legend Helvetia, rev: numeral 5 in a wreath. Minted from 1879 in cupronickel (Cu-Ni, 2.0g); obv: head of Liberty (design by Karl Schwenzer), legend Confœderatio Helvetica. Minted in cupronickel from 1879-1980, except in 1918 (brass, Cu-Zn), 1932-1939 and 1941 (nickel). Minted in aluminium-bronze (Cu-Zn-Al) since 1981; all pre-1981 versions were taken out of circulation in 1984.
- 10 centimes: billon (10% silver, 2.5g); designed by Karl Friedrich Voigt; obv.: federal coat of arms with oak leaves and legend Helvetia, rev: numeral 10 in a wreath. Minted from 1879 in Cupronickel (Cu-Ni, 3.0g); obv: head of Liberty (by Karl Schwenzer), legend Confœderatio Helvetica. Minted in cupronickel from 1879-present except in 1932-1939 (pure nickel). The 1850–1876 coins were taken out of circulation in 1886; the coins of 1879 onward remain legal tender. As the Batzen in the concordate currency of the 1820s represented a tenth of a franc (in pre-revolutionary currency: a seventh of a franc), the 10 centime coin retained the name of Batzen colloquially. This coin, unchanged in design and composition since 1879, entered the Guinness Book of Records as the oldest original currency in circulation.
- 20 centimes: billon (15% silver, 3.25g); designed by Karl Friedrich Voigt; obv.: federal coat of arms with edelweiss and legend Helvetia, rev: numeral 20 in a wreath. Minted from 1881 in nickel (4.0g); obv: head of Liberty (by Karl Schwenzer), legend Confœderatio Helvetica. Minted since 1939 in cupronickel (Cu-Ni); pre-1938 coins were taken out of circulation in 2004.

=== Silver coins ===
The 1/2, 1, 2 and 5 francs coins were silver, from 1968 Cupronickel. The pre-1969 coins were taken out of circulation in 1971.

==== 1/2 franc ====
The 1/2 franc coin of 1850/1851 was 2.5g of 90% silver; obv: seated Helvetia (by Friedrich Fisch), rev: "1/2 Fr." in a wreath. In 1875 debased to 83.5% silver, design changed to obv: standing Helvetia (by Albert Walch). From 1968: Cu–Ni (2.2g).

==== 1 franc ====
The 1 franc coin was 5.0g of 90% silver; obv: seated Helvetia (by Friedrich Fisch), rev: "1 Fr." in a wreath. In 1860 debased to 80% silver, design changed to obv: standing Helvetia (by Albert Walch). 1875–1967 83.5% silver, from 1968: Cu–Ni (4.4g).

==== 2 francs ====
The 2 francs coin of 1850/1857 was 10.0g of 90% silver; obv: seated Helvetia (by Friedrich Fisch), rev: "2 Fr." in a wreath. 1860: 80% silver, obv: a Swiss cross in a circle of stars, rev: legend 2 Francs in a wreath. 1860–1863: return to the seated Helvetia motif. From 1874: standing Helvetia (by Albert Walch). 1874–1967: 83.5% silver, from 1968: Cu–Ni (8.8g).

==== 5 francs ====
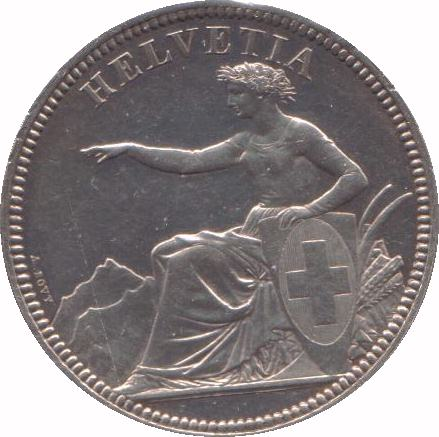
The "seated Helvetia" motif on the obverse of the 5 francs Schützentaler of 1855.

The 5 francs coin of 1850 was modelled on the French 5 franc coin of 1795, which saw wide circulation in western Switzerland. The old Swiss franc of the Helvetic Republic was also known as livre suisse ('Swiss pound'), and the colloquial name Fünfliber of the 5 franc coin retains the denomination livre 'pound'.

The original 5 francs coin of 1850/1851, 1855, and 1873/1874 was 25.0 grams of 90% silver. The obverse side showed the seated Helvetia figure (by Friedrich Fisch) with the legend Helvetia, the reverse "5 Fr." in a wreath. 1888–1916: obv: head of Liberty (by Karl Schwenzer), with legend Confœderatio Helvetica, rev: engrailed federal coat of arms in a wreath, "5" and "F on either side of the shield. The edge has an inscription in relief: Dominus Providebit with 13 stars (in groups of 10 and 3).

In 1922, the coin was re-issued. The reason was a substantial loss of silver coins during World War I; many Swiss coins had been melted into bullion in France and Italy, and the Swiss National bank had been authorized to issue temporary 5 francs banknotes. A first competition for the redesign in 1919 received 542 entries by 202 artists. In a second competition, two designs of an "alpine herdsman" by Paul Burkhard were chosen, but the Federal Council asked Burkhard to reduce the full-body depiction to a bust.

The final design on the obverse shows the bust of an alpine herdsman in semi-profile, with the legend Confœderatio Helvetica, rev: federal coat of arms without hatching, flanked by edelweiss and gentian, legend "5 Fr." above the shield, the rim inscription was as in 1888–1916. In 1931, the 5 francs coin was reduced from 25 to 15 grams, and debased from 90% to 83.5%, for a fine silver content of 12.5 grams in the coins of 1931–1967 (compared to 22.5 grams in the coins of 1850–1928).

A first batch in Cupronickel (13.2g) was made in 1968, a final batch in silver in 1969. The 1985–1993 versions had the rim inscription engraved rather than embossed; these coins were taken out of circulation in 2004.

There has been some debate as to the significance of the 13 stars on the edge. In reaction to a suggestion that they represent the Thirteen Cantons, Edmund Platel, director of the federal mint, in a 1899 article asserted that they hold no significance, being merely used as filler between the words. A Swissmint publication of 2008 references a popular belief that their division in groups of 3 and 10 has a religious significance (for the Trinity and the Ten Commandments), but classifies this as "unfounded speculation", as the division into these groups has technical reasons in the production process.

There has also been speculation as to the person depicted as "alpine herdsman" by Burkhard, with candidates named as Jost Schillig of Bürglen (1864–1938), Sepp Maria Planzer of Riedertal near Bürglen (1881–1964) and wrestler Franz Betschart of Ingenbohl (1871–1949).

==== Collector's value ====
Some of the older coins have considerable collector's value, especially the rarer batches of the 5 franc coin. The 1873 version of the 5 francs coin, produced in a small batch of 30,000 pieces, sees offers upward of CHF 2,000 in auctions. The even rarer 1912 version, produced in a batch of 11,000 pieces, upward of CHF 3,000. The extremely rare 2 francs coin of 1857, produced in a trial run of 622 pieces, is sold for upward of CHF 15,000. The rarest and most highly priced Swiss federal coins are the silver coins of 1896, minted in very small numbers. These coins are traded for amounts in excess of CHF 30,000.

=== Gold coins ===
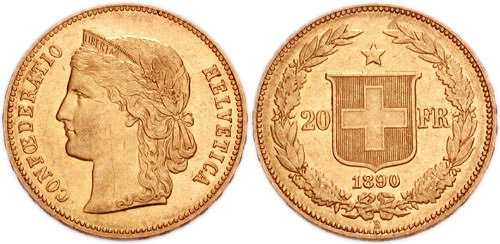
20 franc coin of 1890

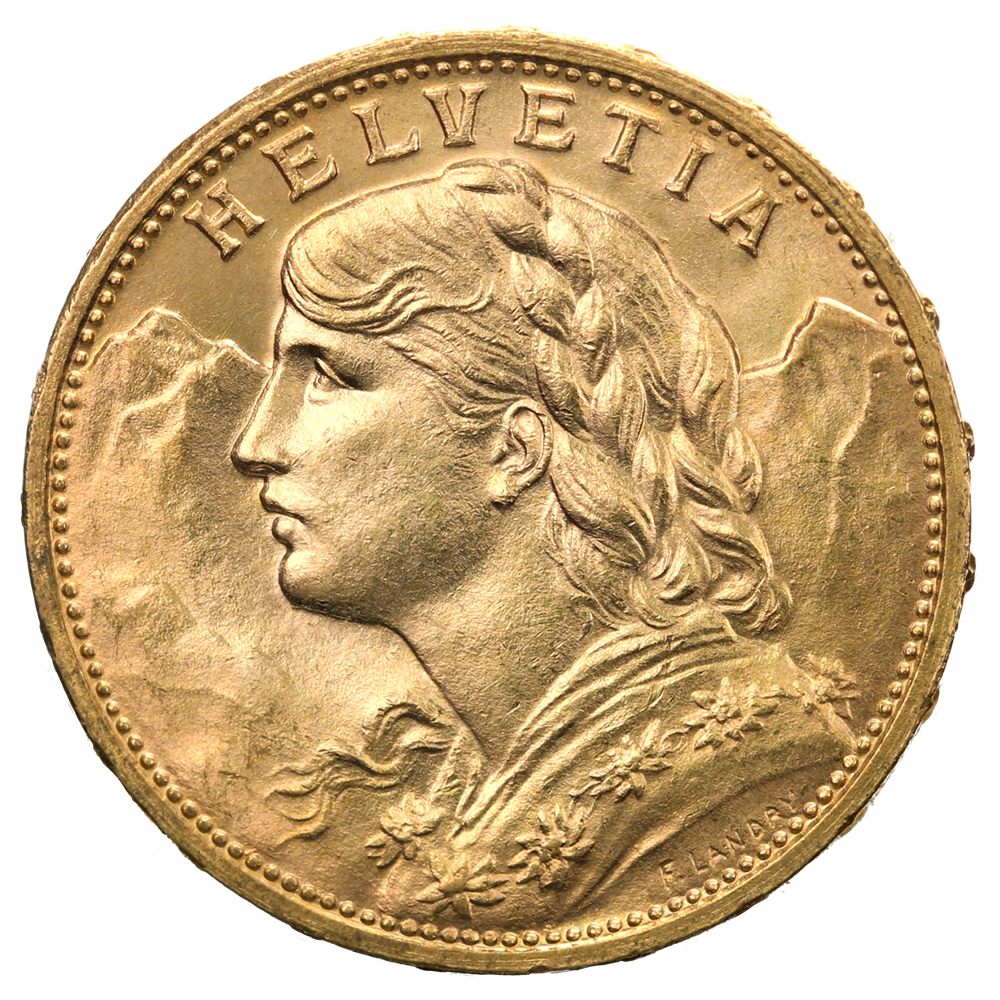
Vreneli head in the final design of 1897

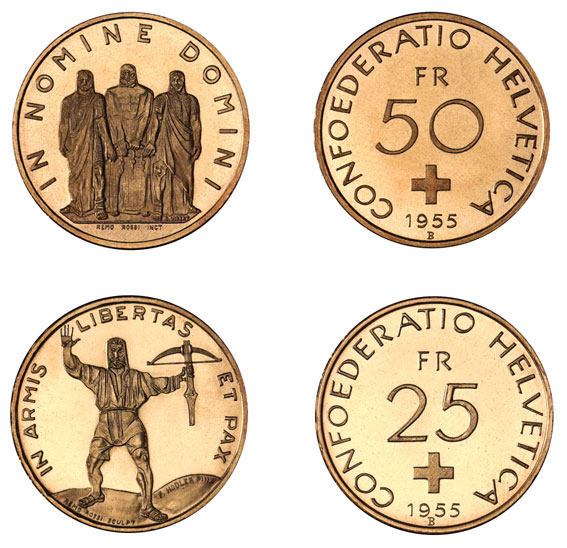
The CHF 25 and CHF 50 coins planned in the 1950s. CHF 50: The Three Confederates based on the 1914 statue by James Vibert, legend In nomine Domini. CHF 25: The figure of William Tell based on the 1897 painting by Ferdinand Hodler, legend In armis libertas et pax.

The 20 franc gold coin was introduced in 1883, in the same design as the 5 francs coin at the time (with the Liberty head by Albert Walch, facing left, on the obverse, and a coat of arms designed by Albert Walch on the reverse). It contained 6.45g gold at 90% purity. Trial production of 20 francs coins were made in 1871 and 1873, in four batches: in 1871, 200 pieces of a coin with the legend "20 FR." in a wreath, and 30 pieces with a head of Liberty design by Durussel; in 1873, coins with a seated Helvetia motif by Dorer in two batches of 1000 and 80 pieces, respectively.

In 1895, the Federal Council decided that the coin should be made with a novel design. From a total of 21 suggestions, a depiction of Helvetia by Neuchâtel artist Fritz Ulysse Landry (1842–1927) won second place. His Helvetia figure was criticized as too young and romantic, and the alpine panorama as too intrusive. Landry revisited his design and the revised design was chosen for the coin. It shows a female head with tresses in profile, with a garland of edelweiss and an alpine panorama. A trial run of only 12 pieces shows the head with an additional forelock which was removed as "too frivolous". The final design was still criticized as still too frivolous for a national representation, but at the same time it was widely popular and given the endearing nickname of Vreneli.

The coin was minted between 1897 and 1949 with a total issue of 58.6 million pieces. A 10 francs version of the coin was produced from 1911 to 1922, with a total issue of 2.6 million. In 1925, 5,000 pieces of a 100 francs version were minted. The first series of banknotes, issued 1907, included no 10 or 20 francs denomination. The gold coins existed in circulation alongside the corresponding banknotes during 1911–1936. With the devaluation of 1936, the gold value of the 20 franc coin rose to 28 francs. In spite of this, production of the 20 franc coin continued until 1949, and the coin has never been officially retired from circulation, even though its gold value has now risen far beyond its nominal value of 20 francs.

The pre-1897 versions of the 20 franc coin are very rare. Trial versions were produced in 1871 in two designs at 200 and 30 pieces, respectively, in 1873 in 1,000 and 80 pieces, respectively. A small number of coins was made from gold mined in the Gondo mine (Zwischbergen, Valais): 25 pieces in 1893, 19 pieces in 1895, 29 pieces in 1897.

Two additional gold coins, with nominal values of 25 and 50 francs, were planned in the 1950s. The design was chosen in 1954, the 25 francs coin represented William Tell and the 50 francs coin the Rütli oath. A total of 15 and 6 million pieces of the 25 and 50 francs version, respectively, were minted in 1955, 1956 and 1959. However, in the interest of maintaining the national gold reserves, the coins were never given into circulation and remained the property of the Swiss National Bank. In a press release of February 2009, it was made public that all of these coins had been melted back into bars except for a remainder of 20,000 coins of each type and year (for a total of 120,000 surviving pieces).

== Circulation ==
Since 2004 the pure nickel 10 centime coins of the years 1932-1939 and 20 centime coins of the years 1881–1938 have been withdrawn from circulation because machines cannot detect them. Today, all the coins except the current 5 centime coin (aluminium-bronze since 1981) are in a copper-nickel (cupronickel) alloy. Seven coins are currently in circulation:

Circulating coins
Image	Value	Technical parameters				Description			Issued from
Image	Value	Diameter (mm)	Thickness (mm)	Mass (g)	Composition	Edge	Obverse	Reverse	Issued from
	5 c	17.15	1.25	1.80	Aluminium bronze: Cu: 92% Al: 6% Ni: 2%	Smooth	Liberty (Karl Schwenzer); year of issue; Lettering: CONFŒDERATIO; HELVETICA	Value; mintmark; wreath of grapes	1981–present
	10 c	19.15	1.45	3.00	Cupronickel: Cu: 75% Ni: 25%	Smooth	Liberty (Karl Schwenzer); year of issue; Lettering: CONFŒDERATIO; HELVETICA	Value; mintmark; wreath of oak leaves	1879–1915; 1919–1931; 1940–present
	20 c	21.05	1.65	4.00	Cupronickel: Cu: 75% Ni: 25%	Smooth	Liberty (Karl Schwenzer); year of issue; Lettering: CONFŒDERATIO; HELVETICA	Value; mintmark; wreath of gentian	1939–present
	1/2 Fr	18.20	1.25	2.20	Cupronickel: Cu: 75% Ni: 25%	Reeded	Helvetia (Albert Walch); circle of 23 stars; Lettering: HELVETIA; A BOVY INCT	Value; mintmark; year of issue; wreath of oak leaves and gentian	1968–present
	1 Fr	23.20	1.55	4.40	Cupronickel: Cu: 75% Ni: 25%	Reeded	Helvetia (Albert Walch); circle of 23 stars; Lettering: HELVETIA; A BOVY INCT	Value; mintmark; year of issue; wreath of oak leaves and gentian	1968–present
	2 Fr	27.40	2.15	8.80	Cupronickel: Cu: 75% Ni: 25%	Reeded	Helvetia (Albert Walch); circle of 23 stars; Lettering: HELVETIA; A BOVY INCT	Value; mintmark; year of issue; wreath of oak leaves and gentian	1968–present
	5 Fr	31.45	2.35	13.20	Cupronickel: Cu: 75% Ni: 25%	Embossed lettering: DOMINUS PROVIDEBIT ★★★★★★★★★★★★★	Herdsman (Paul Burkhard); Lettering: CONFŒDERATIO; HELVETICA; P BVRKHARD INCT	Coat of arms; edelweiss and gentian branches; value; mintmark; year of issue	1968–1983; 1991–present

== Withdrawn ==
The following denominations below have been withdrawn from circulation either due to their low value, or for other reasons such as compositions being problematic when being detected by machines.

Image	Value	Diameter	Thickness	Mass	Composition	Years	Edge	Obverse	Reverse	Withdrawn
	1 centime	16 mm	1.1 mm	1.5 g	Bronze; 95% Cu, 2.5% Sn, 2.5% Zn	1879–2005	Plain	Swiss cross, year	"1" wheat stalk	2006
	1 centime	16 mm	1.1 mm	1.4 g	Zinc; 99.99%	1942–1946	Plain	Swiss Coat of Arms, year	"1", wreath of laurels	2006
	2 centimes	20 mm	.98 mm	2.4 g	Bronze; 95% Cu, 2.5% Sn, 2.5% Zn	1879–1973	Plain	Swiss cross, year	"2" wheat stalk	1974
	2 centimes	20 mm	.98 mm	2.5 g	Zinc; 99.99%	1942–1946	Plain	Swiss Coat of Arms, year	"2", wreath of laurels	1974
	5 centimes	17.15 mm	1.25 mm	2.0 g	Cupronickel; 75% Cu, 25% Ni	1879–1981	Plain	Head of Liberty (Karl Schwenzer), "CONFŒDERATIO HELVETICA", year	"5", wreath of grapes	1984
	5 centimes	17.15 mm	1.25 mm	2.0 g	Nickel; 99.99%	1932–1939, 1941	Plain	Head of Liberty (Karl Schwenzer), "CONFŒDERATIO HELVETICA", year	"5", wreath of grapes	2004
	10 centimes	19.15 mm	1.45 mm	3.0 g	Brass; 60% Cu, 40% Zn	1916–1918	Plain	Head of Liberty (Karl Schwenzer), "CONFŒDERATIO HELVETICA", year	"10", wreath of oak leaves	2004
	10 centimes	19.15 mm	1.45 mm	3.0 g	Nickel; 99.99% Ni	1932–1939	Plain	Head of Liberty (Karl Schwenzer), "CONFŒDERATIO HELVETICA", year	"10", wreath of oak leaves	2004
	20 centimes	21.05 mm	1.65 mm	4.0 g	Nickel; 99.99% Ni	1881–1944	Plain	Head of Liberty (Karl Schwenzer), "CONFŒDERATIO HELVETICA", year	"20", wreath of gentian	2004

== Commemorative coins ==
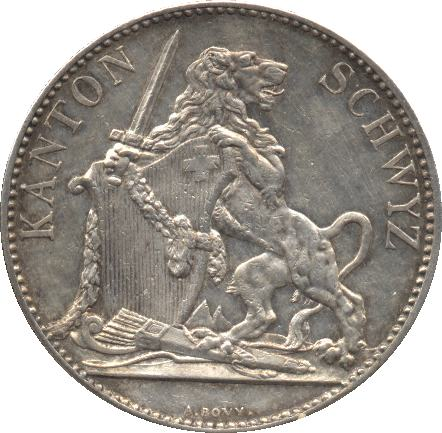
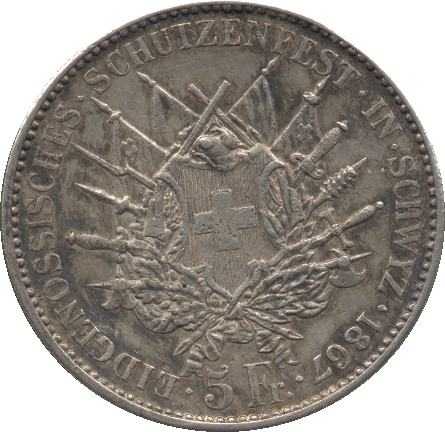
Schützentaler, Eidgenössisches Schützenfest in Schwyz, 1867.

The federal mint has issued numerous commemorative or collectors' editions of coins. This tradition originates with the Schützentaler of 1855. In this year, the federal mint produced a special batch of 5 francs coins for the Eidgenössisches Schützenfest in Solothurn. This coin was a regular 5 francs coin, with the exception of the inscription on the edge. Beginning in 1857, Schützentaler with were minted in special designs but in the specifications of the 5 francs coin. The final such coin was minted for the 1939 festival.

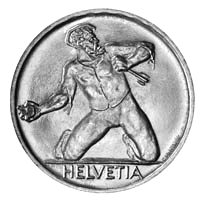
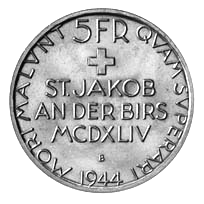
Commemorative 5 francs coin "Battle of St. Jakob an der Birs", 1944.

Beginning in 1936, the federal mint issued commemorative coins at irregular intervals. The 1936 issue commemorated the national war bond (Wehranleihe). Further commemorative 5 francs coins in silver were issued in 1939 (Battle of Laupen), 1941 (Rütli oath, 650th anniversary of the Federal Charter), 1944 (Battle of St. Jakob an der Birs), 1948 (Swiss Federal Constitution, 100th anniversary) and 1963 (Red Cross, 100th anniversary). These were legal tender at the time, but were removed from circulation along with the regular silver coins in 1971.

Commemorative 5 francs coins in Cupronickel were issued in yearly intervals during 1974–1990. These remain legal tender, and may occasionally be seen in circulation, as their collector's value does not significantly exceed their face value:

- 1974: Constitutional Revision (1874)
- 1975: European Year of Historic Preservation
- 1976: Battle of Murten (1476)
- 1977: Heinrich Pestalozzi (d. 1827)
- 1978: Henry Dunant (b. 1828)
- 1979: Albert Einstein (b. 1879) in two versions
- 1980: Ferdinand Hodler
- 1981: Stanser Verkommnis (1481)
- 1982: Gotthard railway (opened 1882)
- 1983: Ernest Ansermet (b. 1883)
- 1984: Auguste Picard (b. 1884)
- 1985: European Year of Music
- 1986: Battle of Sempach (1386)
- 1987: Le Corbusier (b. 1887)
- 1988: Olympic Movement
- 1989: Henri Guisan (general mobilisation 1939)
- 1990: Gottfried Keller (d. 1890)

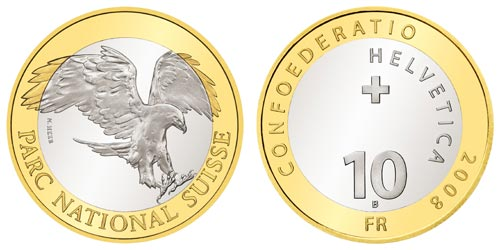
Bimetal commemorative 10 francs coin "Swiss National Park", 2008.

Swissmint has produced an increasing variety of commemorative coins beginning in the 1990s. All of these coins are technically legal tender, but are not in actual circulation, as their metal or collector's value will exceed their nominal value.

- Silver coins: 20 francs coins in silver were issued yearly beginning in 1992, with several designs per year issued from 1996 onward.
- Gold coins: In 1991, a commemorative gold coin with nominal value of 250 francs was issued on the occasion of the 700 years anniversary of the foundation of the Old Swiss Confederacy. During 1998–2000, commemorative gold coins have been issued with a nominal value 100 francs. Beginning in 2001, nominal values of 50 francs were issued instead. A special "1/4 Fr" gold coin was issued in 2020. Advertised as "the world's smallest gold coin", this had a weight of 0.063 g (1/500 troy ounce).
- Bimetal coins: Coins in two alloys (Cu 75/Ni 25 and Cu 89/Al 5/Zn 5/Sn 1) have been issued with nominal values of 5 and 10 francs during 1999–2003 and since 2004, respectively.

== See also ==
- Swiss franc
- Centime
- Rappen
- Vreneli
- Banknotes of the Swiss franc
- Swissmint
