= Eidgenössisches Schützenfest =

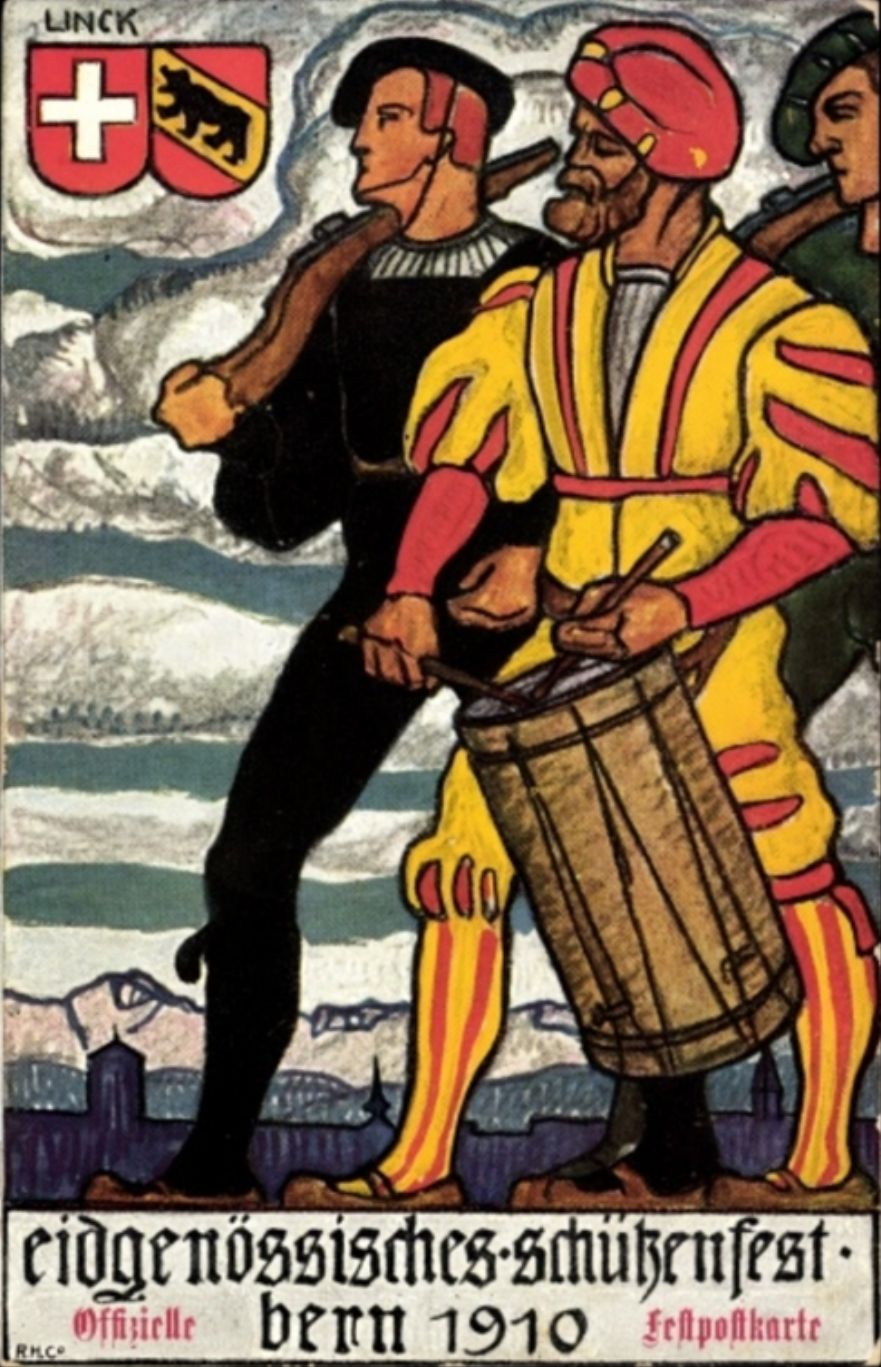
Poster for the 1910 festival in Bern

Eidgenössische Schützenfeste (singular Eidgenössisches Schützenfest, French: Fête Fédérale de Tir, Italian: Festa tiro federale) are the Swiss federal shooting competitions organized by the Schweizerischer Schützenverein since 1824.

== History ==
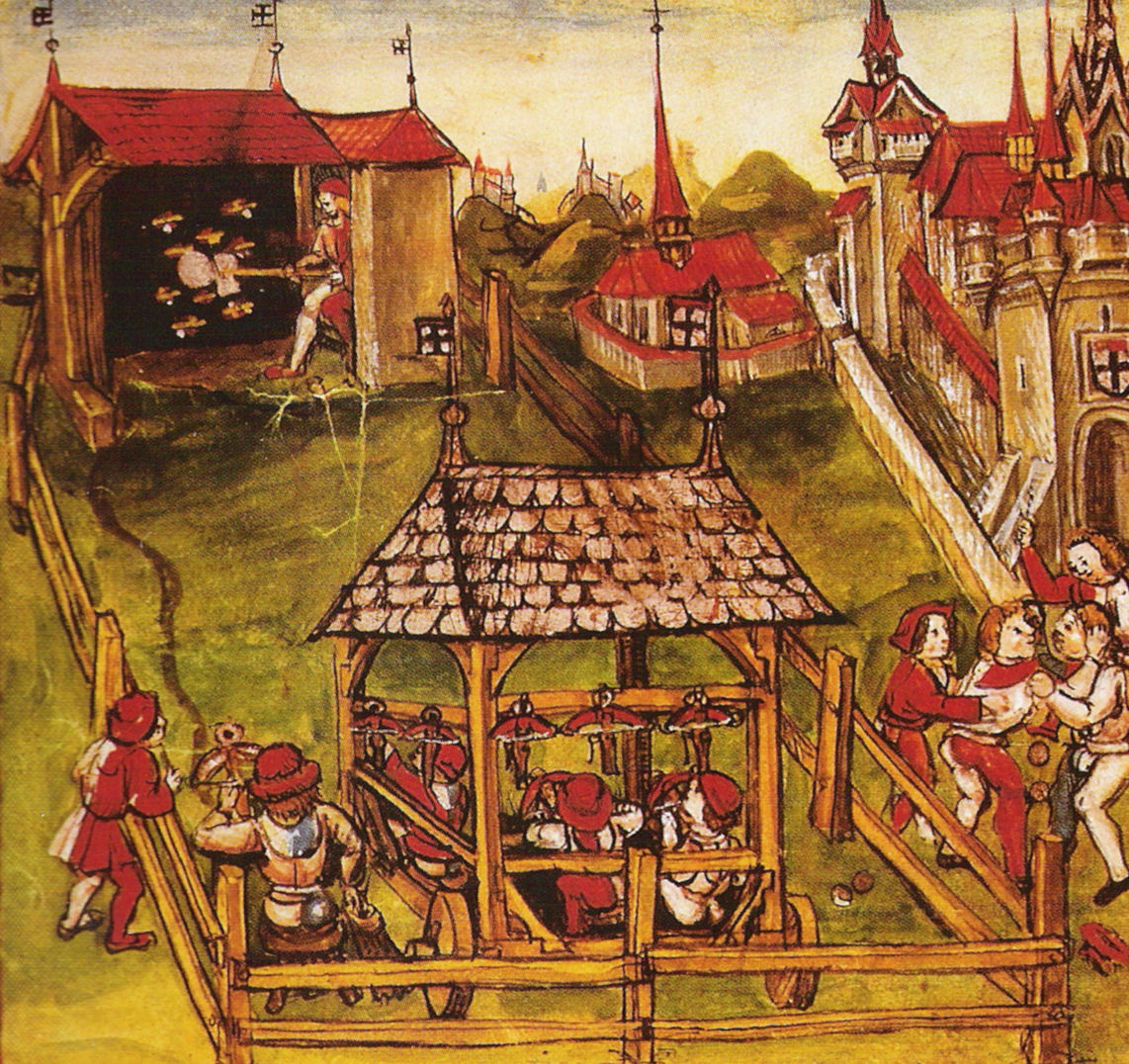
The 1458 Schützenfest in Konstanz as depicted in the Luzerner Chronik of 1513.

Organised shooting societies are recorded in Swiss cities from the 14th century, at the time mostly using crossbows. The first blackpowder shooting societies are formed in the later 15th century; Geneva in 1474 had three separate societies for crossbow, longbow and arquebus shooters.

Schützenfeste contributed significantly to the coherence between the individual cantons. After the end of the Old Zürich War (1450), the federal shooting festival in Sursee (1452) contributed to the renewal of cohesion between the members of the confederacy. Federal events became popular in the wake of the Sursee festival, with events in Feldkirch (1455), Strasbourg (1456) and Constance (1458).

The shooting societies petitioned the Tagsatzung of 1500 for a federal festival to be held yearly. There were, however, concerns for public order in relation to the large gathering of armed men; the Plappartkrieg of 1458 was a minor war triggered by a riot at the Constance festival. In 1504, Zürich organised a general "German" (Deutsch) shooting festival, intended as including participants beyond the confederacy. This was intended as re-establishing peaceful relations in the wake of the Swabian War. A total of 614 invitations were sent to Swabia, Bavaria, Tyrol and as far as to the Rhineland and the Low Countries. The Swiss Reformation interrupted the tradition. The last three federal shooting festivals took place in 1604–1608. After 1608, the federal event was replaced by cantonal and local competitions.

The first modern cantonal shooting association was formed in Vaud in 1802. The federal army formed in 1817 for the Restored Confederacy included 20 companies of sharp-shooters with 100 men each, which acted as advocates for target shooting among the general population.

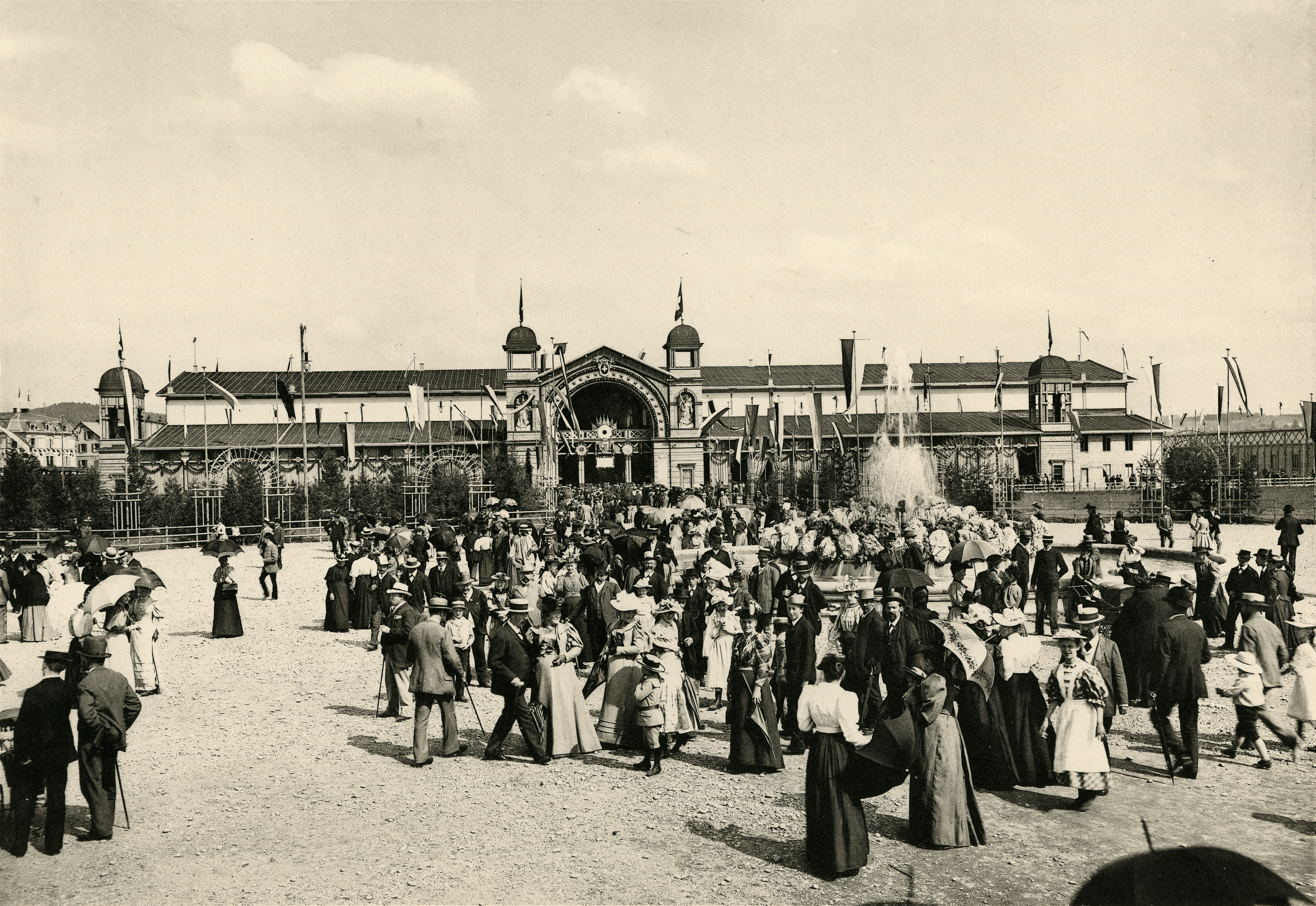
Winterthur 1895, view of the main entrance

At the first modern Eidgenössisches Freischiessen in 1824, the federal shooting association, Schweizerischer Schützenverein was founded. In the following years, the federal shooting festivals played an important role in the politics of the formative Swiss federal state. The first federal Schützenfest after the formation of the federal state, again held in Aarau, in 1849, figures prominently in Gottfried Kellers Das Fähnlein der sieben Aufrechten, where Keller portrays the shooting clubs as vital for the preservation of direct democracy in the young Swiss federal state.

Further festivals were held between 1859 and 1977 at irregular intervals of 2 to 6 years, with longer gaps, between 1910–1924 and 1939–1949, due to the World Wars. From 1985, the Eidgenössisches Schützenfest was held regularly every five years.

=== List of festivals ===
- Old Confederacy:
  1452 Sursee, 1455 Feldkirch, 1456 Strasbourg, 1458 Constance, 1504 Zürich,
  1604 Solothurn, 1605 Basel, 1608 Zürich.
- Restored Confederacy:
  1824 Aarau, 1827 Basel, 1828 Geneva, 1829 Fribourg, 1830 Bern, 1832 Lucerne, 1834 Zürich, 1836 Lausanne, 1838 St. Gallen, 1842 Chur, 1844 Basel, 1847 Glarus.
- Pre-WWI
  1849 Aarau, 1851 Geneva, 1853 Lucerne, 1855 Solothurn, 1859 Zürich, 1861 Stans, 1863 La Chaux-de-Fonds, 1865 Schaffhausen, 1867 Schwyz, 1869 Zug, 1872 Zürich, 1874 St. Gallen, 1876 Lausanne, 1879 Basel, 1881 Fribourg, 1883 Lugano, 1885 Bern, 1890 Frauenfeld, 1892 Glarus, 1895 Winterthur, 1898 Neuchâtel, 1901 Lucerne, 1904 St. Gallen, 1907 Zürich, 1910 Bern.
- Interwar:
  1920 Zürich, 1924 Aarau, 1929 Bellinzona, 1934 Fribourg, 1939 Lucerne.
- Post-1945:
  1949 Chur, 1954 Lausanne, 1958 Biel, 1963 Zürich, 1969 Thun, 1979 Lucerne,
  1985 Chur, 1990 Winterthur, 1995 Thun, 2000 Bière, 2005 Frauenfeld, 2010 Aarau, 2015 Raron, 2021 Lucerne

== Competition ==
The early shooting competitions of the 19th century were with Perkussionsstutzen, custom-made smoothbore muskets made for target-shooting. The Swiss Armed Forces introduced standardised service weapons beginning with the Infanteriegewehr Modell 1842. The first service weapon with rifled barrel was the Peabody action (1867). From the late 19th century, competitions were predominantly with Swiss service rifles, Vetterli rifle (1870), Schmidt-Rubin (1889, 1896), Swiss Mannlicher M1893 carbine, Karabiner Modell 1900/05/1911.

The Federal Shooting Association (SSV) from 1899 began to give financial support to cantonal Feldschiessen events in years between the federal festivals. Cantonal competition rules were standardised in the early 20th century, with the first Feldschiessen with pistol in 1919. From 1926, all cantons participated in Feldschiessen, since 1940 as an annual event. Pistol shooting became popular in the 1920s to 1930s, with many shooting societies forming pistol sections. A separate federation for revolver and pistol shooting (SRPV) was formed in 1921 (united with SSV in 1995). The first federal shooting festival to include pistol competitions was the one in Bellinzona 1929.

The Feldschiessen is held decentrally, mostly by district, on a single week-end in June. Shooting is only with ordnance weapons. by contrast, Eidgenössische Schützenfeste last for a full month, mostly mid-June to mid-July and besides the competition rules for ordnance weapons, they have additional categories for standard sport shooting weapons. The oldest ordnance weapons still in use are Karabiner Modell 1931 and Parabellum/Luger pistol 1906/1929.

The 2020 festival in Lucerne is scheduled as taking place on ten different shooting ranges, in the disciplines: rifle 300 m, rifle 50 m, pistol 50 m, and pistol 25 m.

The rifle competitions are in the three categories: A. standard sporting rifles, D. Stgw 57/03, and E. Stgw 90, Stgw 57/02 and K31. The pistol competitions are in the three categories: A. standard sport pistols, B. rimfire pistols, C. ordnance pistols (P06/29, P49, P75).

== Schützentaler ==
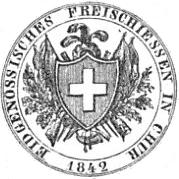
Obverse

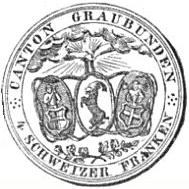
Reverse

1842 Schützentaler (Chur)

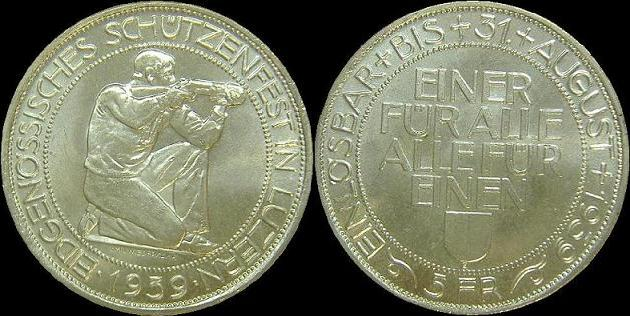
1939 Schützentaler (Lucerne)

Schützentaler (commemorative silver coins in thaler size, not to be confused with shooting medals awarded for shooting performance) were first minted in 1842, by Graubünden for the festival in Chur. Between 1855 and 1885, fifteen such coins were issued by the federal mint with the denomination of five francs; two final Schützentaler were issued by the federal mint in 1934 and 1939.

During 1890–1929 and since 1949, privately produced commemorative gold and silver medals have been issued for the federal shooting festivals, sometimes also included under the term of Schützentaler.

== See also ==
- Schützentaler
