= Johann-Baptist Frener =

Swiss-Guatemalan engraver (1821–1892)

Johann-Baptist Frener (1821–1892) was an engraver from Lucerne, who was instrumental in the creation of coinage for the early republics of Guatemala and Honduras.

== Life ==
Frener was born on the 10 December 1821. Orphaned at an early age, his talents were spotted by teachers in Luzern. This earned him a scholarship to the École des Beaux-Arts, under the direction of Antoine Bovy, James Pradier and Jean-Auguste-Dominique Ingres. Later studies in Florence are said to have put him in contact with the composer Giuseppe Verdi.

In the early 1850s, Frener won a commission to work at the mint of Guatemala, and to engrave coinage bearing the portrait of dictator Rafael Carrera. He also designed a number of military and commemorative medals. After the Liberal Revolution and installation of Justo Rufino Barrios as leader, Frener continued as mint director. His fame led to further commissions by Honduras and El Salvador. It is alleged that he also designed the Flag of Guatemala. He was heavily involved in the Sociedad Económica.

== Notable works ==
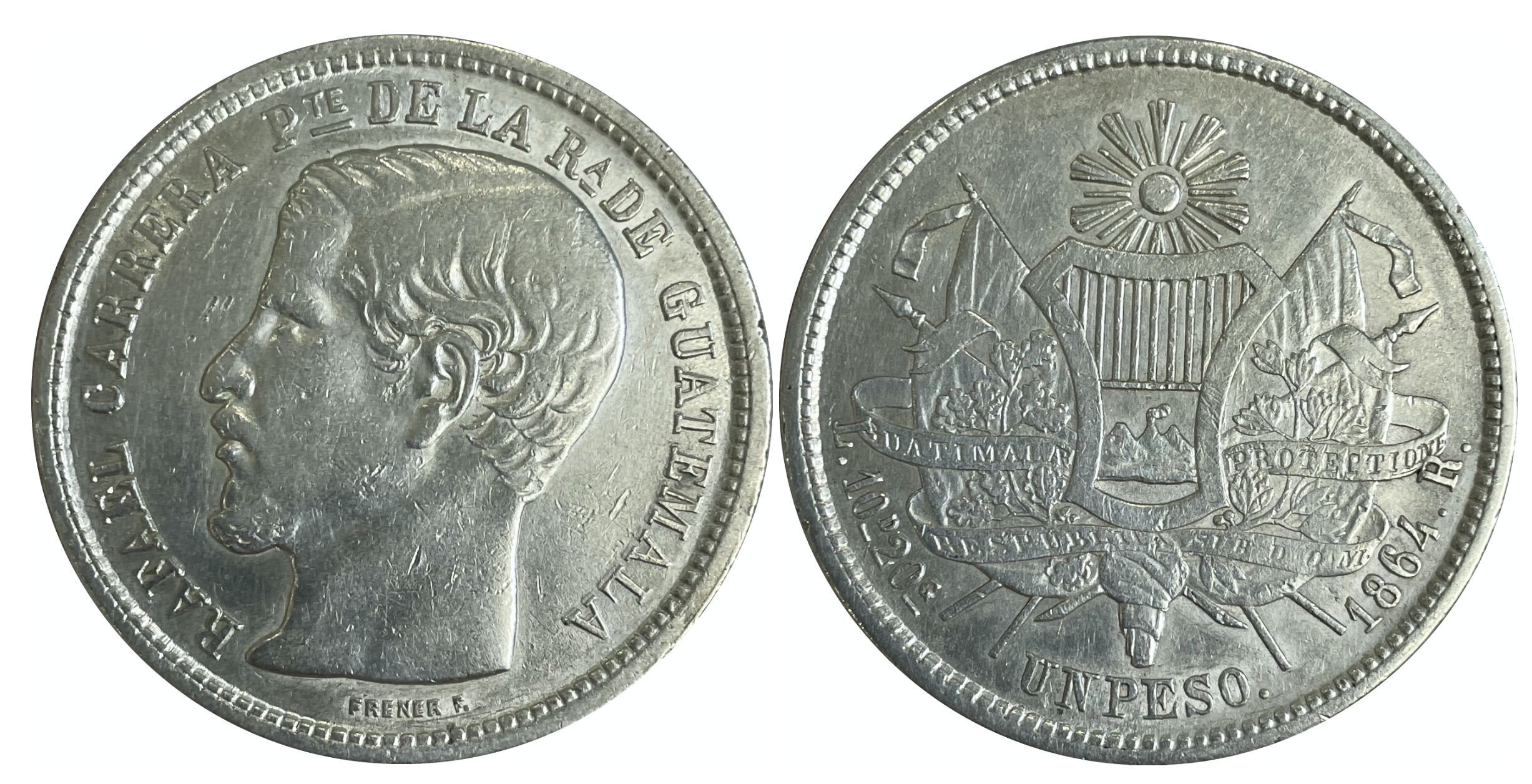
Silver peso with the bust of Rafael Carrera, engraved by Frener

Frener engraved hundreds of coins and medals, many of which are extremely rare. Examples of Frener works have achieved high prices at auction, the record being a Honduran gold 20 peso, which sold for 85,000 Swiss Francs in 2017. Some of his works include:

- 1839 - Theatrical busts surrounding the Theatre of Luzern
- (1850s) Portrait of Casimir Pfyffer von Altishofen
- 1850 - Medal of Verdi
- 1850 - Medal of the Luzern Lion Monument
- 1853 - Luzern Shooting thaler
- 1856 - Portrait of Rafael Carrera
- 1857 - Military medals for the Filibuster War in Nicaragua
- 1863 - Military medals for the War of 1863 against El Salvador
- 1864 - Medal of Isabella II of Spain
- 1871 - Medal of Justo Rufino Barrios
- 1871 - Medal of Miguel García Granados
- 1872 - Medal of Ulysses S. Grant
- 1883 - Medal of Simón Bolívar
- (1880s) - Medal of Manuel Barillas
- 1889 - Medal for the Exposition Universelle (1889) in Paris

Frener's dies continued to be used posthumously in Guatemala, Honduras, and El Salvador.

== Biographies ==
The first biography of Frener was his 1892 obituary by Franz Haas in the Swiss Numismatic Review, which was copied in part by Leonard Forrer in the Biographical Dictionary of Medallists. In 2023 a new 400-page biography and catalog of works was published.
