= Swissmint =

Official mint of Switzerland

Coordinates: 46.940614°N 7.448269°E

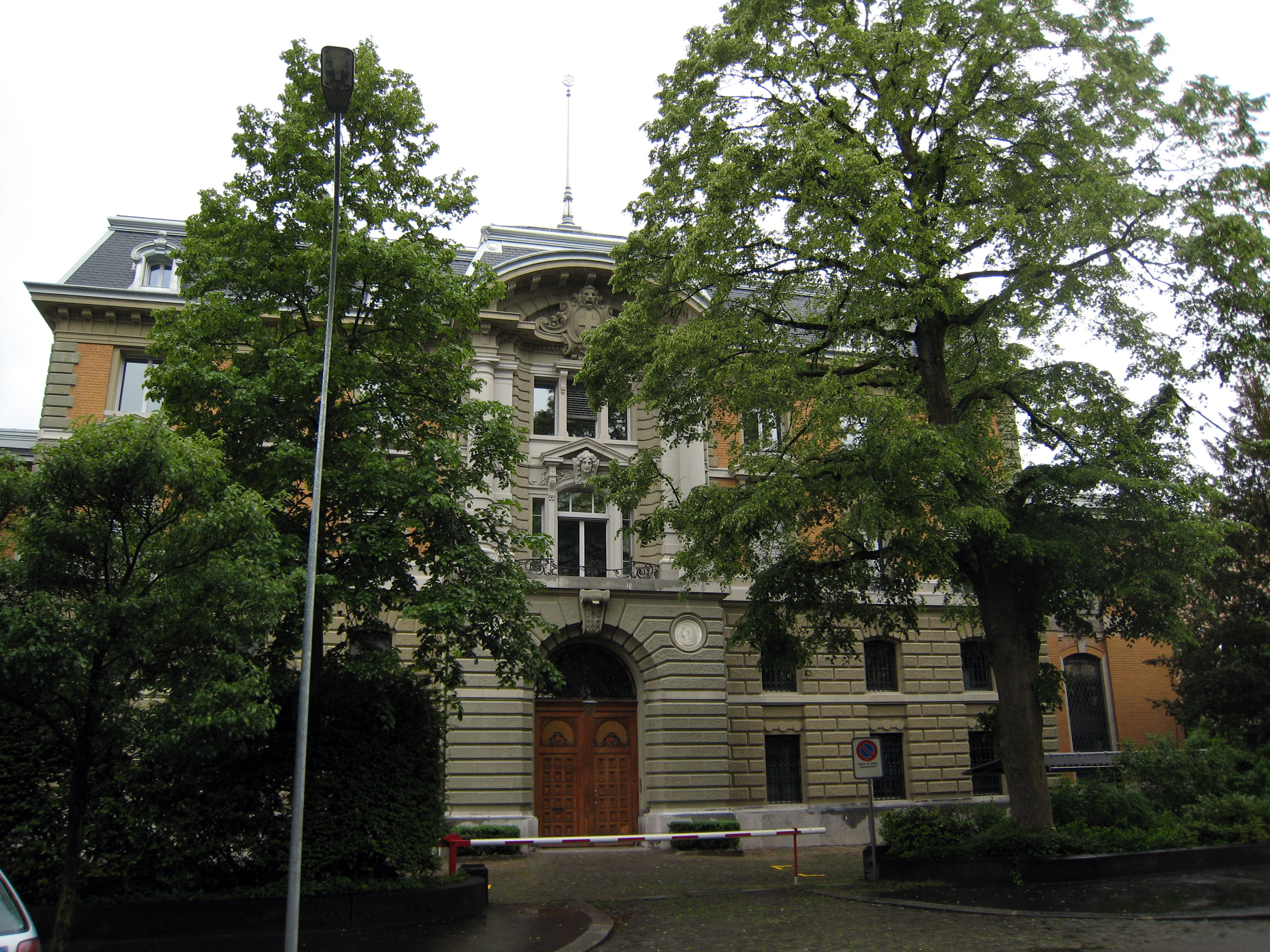
- Industry: Metalworking
- Founded: 1848; 178 years ago
- Headquarters: Bern, Switzerland
- Area served: Switzerland
- Products: coins

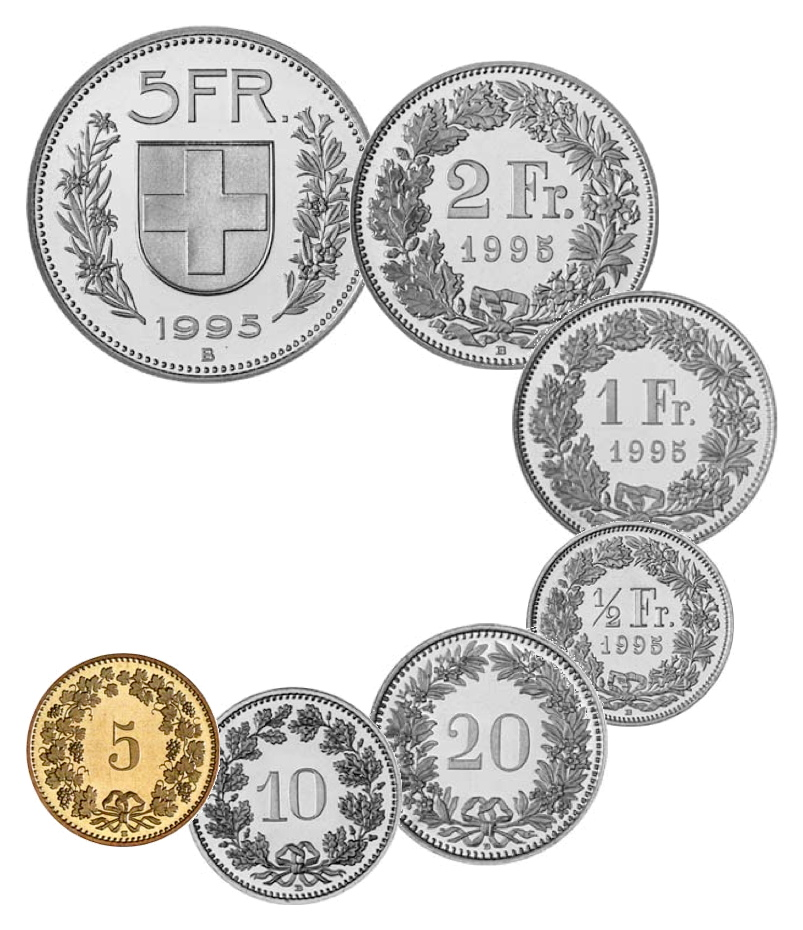
The current coins of the Swiss franc

Swissmint is the official mint of the Swiss Confederation. Located in the Swiss federal city Bern, it is responsible for manufacturing Swiss franc coins, both of the currency and bullion variety. Apart from making coins for the government, Swissmint also manufactures medals and commemorative coins for private customers.

== Status ==
Swissmint is an agency of the Swiss federal government. It is part of the Federal Finance Administration, which in turn belongs to the Federal Department of Finance. Since 1998, the Official Mint of the Confederation operates as an independent business unit under the name Swissmint. As of 2005, Swissmint has 21 employees.

== Building ==
The mint's building is a heritage site of national significance. It was built in 1903–06 based on designs by Theodor Gohl to replace an older building at the Gerberngraben. The sober, industrial-style yellow brick building is fronted by a Neo-Renaissance façade in marble and sandstone.

== Full-time positions since 2007 ==
Raw data

Source: "Federal Finance Administration FFA: Data portal".

== See also ==
- Swiss National Bank, the independent institution responsible for Swiss banknotes and monetary policy.
