= Hamburg Centre for Ultrafast Imaging =

German research facility

The Hamburg Centre for Ultrafast Imaging

The Hamburg Centre for Ultrafast Imaging (CUI) is a research facility established in the context of the Universities Excellence Initiative by the German Federal and State Governments. The multidisciplinary and interinstitutional cluster is located at Universität Hamburg, Hamburg, Germany, and has been initiated on 1 November 2012. The funding with more than €25 million by the German Research Foundation will run until 31. December 2018. Scientific teams cooperating in the cluster come from the Universität Hamburg, the Deutsches Elektronen-Synchrotron (DESY), the European XFEL GmbH (XFEL), the European Molecular Biology Laboratory (EMBL), and the newly founded Max-Planck-Institute for the Structure and Dynamics of Matter (MPSD). A full application for a second research period of seven years was handed in at the end of 2017 to the German Research Foundation (DFG) for discussion. After the successful application in 2018, the new cluster “CUI: Advanced Imaging of Matter” started in 2019. In May 2025, the German Research Foundation (DFG) approved continued funding for CUI: Advanced Imaging of Matter as one of Universität Hamburg's four Clusters of Excellence entering the next funding period starting in 2026. The recognition underscores CUI's leading role in quantum technologies and ultrafast imaging research.

== Aims ==
The fundamental research at CUI aims to analyze chemical and physical processes in the field of photon and nano science: About 150 involved scientists investigate the chronological sequence of movements related to reactions and processes at the interface of quantum physics, molecular biology and nanochemistry.

The aim is to watch structural changes of systems in action and draw conclusions about the relation between structure and dynamics and how they facilitate the control of atomic systems. In this respect three research areas are regarded. In the field of "Imaging and Control of Quantum Systems", systems of different size, ranging from small molecules up to volume systems, are investigated with respect to their dynamic quantum mechanical properties, especially regarding their interaction with surrounding light fields. In the second research field "Atomically Resolved Structural Dynamics", CUI regards structural changes of macrobiological and biochemical systems on atomic and temporal levels. In the third topic of research the "Dynamics of Order Formation on the Nanoscale" are investigated.

== Organization ==
The cluster's spokespersons are:

- Prof. Dr. Francesca Calegari, Professor at Universität Hamburg, Lead Scientist at DESY
- Prof. Henry Chapman, DESY, Center for Free-Electron Laser Science
- Prof. Klaus Sengstock, Universität Hamburg, Institute of Laser-Physics

== Teachings and Support ==
A graduate school with an international, interdisciplinary PhD-program is embedded within the cluster of excellence. The school lab "Light and Schools" cooperates with numerous schools in Hamburg and offers the opportunity to explore basic research and modern laser technology outside the classroom. The school lab is supported by the Joachim Herz Foundation.

== Prizes and awards ==
In collaboration with the Joachim Herz Sitftung, CUI awarded the Hamburg Prize for Theoretical Physics, honoring outstanding contributions in the fields of atoms, molecules and quantum optics, as well as condensed matter with a prize-money of €40,000 . In 2018 the prize has been redesigned and for the first time, it is endowed with prize money in the amount of 100 000 euros. It is awarded by the Joachim Herz Stiftung in partnership with the Wolfgang Pauli Centre (WPC) of Universität Hamburg, DESY, and CUI, and honors outstanding contributions to Physics in general. In addition the cluster organizes the Mildred-Dresselhaus Guest Professorship Program with an award including prize-money of 20,000 (senior scientist), respectively €10,000 (junior scientist), in order to recruit designated female scientist to spend a research period in Hamburg as role models for women.

=== Awardees for the Hamburg Prize for Theoretical Physics ===
- 2010 Prof. Maciej Lewenstein, ICFO Barcelona, Spain
- 2011 Prof. Peter Zoller, Universität Innsbruck, Austria
- 2012 Prof. Shaul Mukamel, University of California, USA
- 2013 Prof. Chris H. Greene, Purdue University, USA
- 2014 Prof. Antoine Georges, Collège de France, École Polytechnique, Universität Genf, France/Switzerland
- 2015 Prof. Ignacio Cirac, Max Planck Institute of Quantum Optics in Garching (Munich), Germany
- 2016 Prof. Mikhail Katsnelson, Radboud University of Nijmegen, Netherlands
- 2017 Prof. Andrew Millis, Columbia University, USA
- 2018 Prof.Hirosi Ooguri, California Institute of Technology (Caltech), USA
- 2019 Matthias Troyer, ETH Zürich
- 2020 Valery Rubakov, Russian Academy of Science, Moscow
- 2021 Prof. Eugene Demler, ETH Zürich, Swiss
- 2022 Prof. Nicola Spaldin, Department of Materials Science, ETH Zurich
- 2023 Prof. Edward Witten, Institute for Advanced Study in Princeton, USA

=== Awardees Mildred Dresselhaus Award ===
- Prof. Tamar Seideman, Northwestern University, Chicago, USA (2013)
- Prof. Rosario González-Férez, Universidad de Granada, Spain (2013)
- Prof. Roseanne Sension, University of Michigan, USA (2014)
- Dr. Anouk Rijs, Radoud Universiteit, Netherlands (2014)
- Prof. Dr. Elspeth Garman, University of Oxford, England (2015)
- Dr. Liesbeth Janssen, Heinrich-Heine Universität Düsseldorf, Germany (2015)
- Prof. Cristiane de Morais Smith, Universiteit Utrecht, Netherlands (2016)
- Dr. Friederike Ernst, Stanford University, USA (2016)
- Prof. Dr. Anna Krylov, University of Southern California, USA (2017)
- Prof. Dr. Ruth Signorell, ETH Zurich, Switzerland (2018)
- Prof. Dr. Alicia Palacios, Universidad Autónoma de Madrid, Spain (2018)
- Dr. Giulia Fulvia Mancini, University of Pavia, Italy (2020)
- Dr. Caterina Vozzi, CNR-IFN Milan, Italy (2020)
- Prof. Dr. Prineha Narang, Harvard University, USA (2021)
- Prof. Dr. Jie Shan, Cornell University, USA (2021)
- Dr. Benedetta Flebus, Boston College, USA (2022)
- Prof. Dr. Olga Smirnova, Max-Born-Institut, Germany (2022)
- Prof. Lin X. Chen, Argonne National Laboratory und Northwestern University, USA (2023)
- Dr. Liuyan Zhao, University of Michigan, USA (2023)
- Prof. Sonia Coriani, Technical University of Denmark (2024)
- Dr. Laura Cattaneo, Max Planck Institute for Nuclear Physics Heidelberg, Germany (2024)
- Prof. Teresa Pellegrino, Istituto Italiano di Tecnologia (IIT) in Genoa, Italy (2025)
- Dr. Zala Lenarčič, Jozef Stefan Institute in Ljubljana, Slovenia (2025)

== External links and sources ==
- German Research Foundation (DFG) about the Excellence Initiative
- Description of CUI by the Universität Hamburg
- Description of CUI by the city state Hamburg
- Article: "CUI is officially excellent". Center for Free-Electron Science. 15 June 2012. Retrieved 12 May 2015
- PIER Helmholtz Graduate School about CUI
- Article: "Hamburg physicists successful in Excellence Initiative". European XFEL. 15 June 2012. Retrieved 12 May 2015
- CUI Website
- Participating Institutions
- "Dynamic in realtime". German article: Physik Journal. November 2013. Retrieved 12 May 2015. Archived 2 April 2015.
- Article: "Exzellenzcluster The Hamburg Centre for Ultrafast Imaging". Lifescience Nord. Retrieved 12 May 2015
- Klaus Sengstock
- Article: "Hamburger Wissenschaftspreis für Theoretische Physik" awarded to Maciej Lewenstein
- Article on ChemPhysChem: 2015 ACS National Awards November 2013 for Shaul Mukamel. 12 May 2015. Retrieved 15 June 2015
- Physics Today Post on Facebook about Chris Greene. 27. August 2013. Retrieved 15 June 2015
- Article: "Antoine Georges: Theorist of Condensed Matter". CNSR international magazine. Retrieved 15 June 2015
- German Article: "40,000 Euro for Achievements for Antoine Georges in Theoretical Physics". 13 November 2014. Retrieved 15 June 2015
- German Article: "Prof. Ignacio Cirac wird ausgezeichnet". 25 September 2015. Retrieved 14 November 2015
- Tamar Seidemann
- Rosario González Férez
- Article: "Guest professorship at Hamburg Centre for Ultrafast Imaging for Anouk Rijs". Radboud University. 20 November 2014. Retrieved 15 June 2015
- Roseanne Sension
- About the graduate school by the German Academic Exchange Service - DAAD
- Joachim Herz Foundation
- Article: "Elspeth Garman awarded prestigious Guest Professorship in Hamburg". 21 January 2015. Retrieved 21 January 2016
- German article about the Excellence Strategy: "Erste Entscheidungen in der Exzellenzstrategie". Retrieved 15 November 2017
