= ETH medal =

Swiss award medal

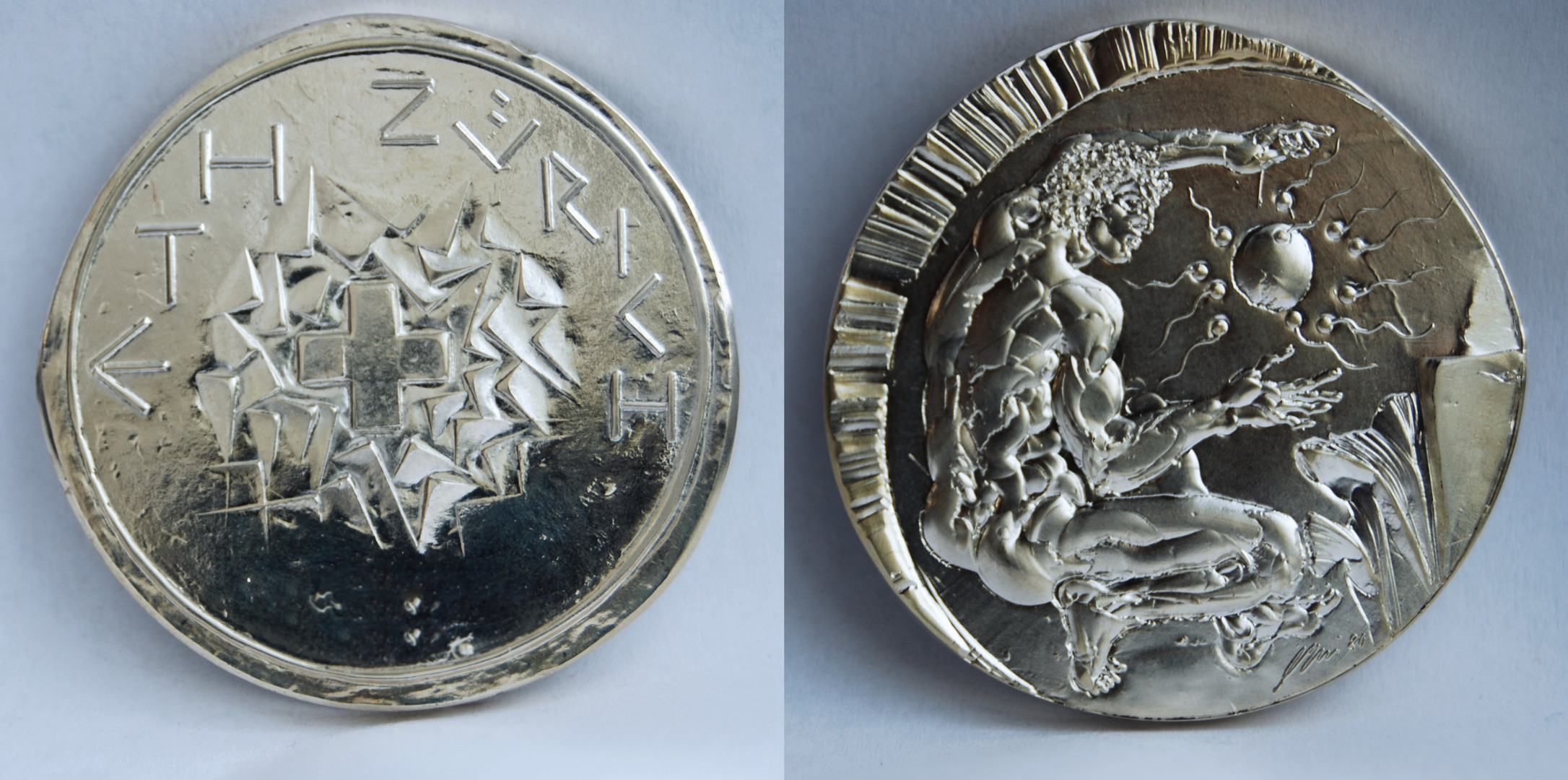
Front and back of the ETH medal awarded by the Swiss Federal Institute of Technology in Zürich

The ETH medal is awarded by the Swiss Federal Institute of Technology in Zürich (ETH Zurich) to outstanding Master's and doctoral theses. The number of bestowals is capped to 2.5% of the Master's theses and 8% of the doctoral theses per field of study. In addition to the silver medal, the award includes a cash prize.

== History ==
Awarding prize medals at ETH Zurich was proposed in 1866. However, the original golden medal from medalist Antoine Bovy was never bestowed. Instead, the first silver medal was awarded in 1870 for a thesis on centrifugal pumps together with a cash price of 130 Swiss francs.

The first version of the medal was replaced in 1955 for the 100th anniversary of ETH by a new design from the Swiss artist Franz Fischer. Again in 1980, for the 125th anniversary of ETH, the third and current version designed by engraver Hans Erni was introduced.

== Versions ==
1. The first version (1870–1955) of the medal was created by Antoine Bovy with support from Gottfried Semper. The backside depicts the ETH main building and the engraved name of the prize recipient. On the front face, the Swiss coat of arms is shown surrounded by 22 stars symbolizing the cantons. Standing on the side are two female allegories signifying liberty and authority. The header reads the Latin words STUDIO and LABORI honoring the recipients diligence. Although the medal was originally designed in gold, only silver medals were awarded.
2. The second version (1955–1980) was designed by Franz Fischer. The revers shows a broadleaf tree with the inscription STUDIO and LABORI. The obverse features a compass held by a forearm.
3. The third version (1980-today) was designed by Hans Erni. On the revers, the Swiss cross is surrounded by stylized alps and the recipient's name is engraved below. On the obverse, the fertilization of an ovum next to a creative observer is depicted. The medal is not perfectly circular.

== Notable recipients ==
Recipients of the ETH medal include:

- Richard R. Ernst, 1962
- Friedrich Hirzebruch, 1950
- Konrad Osterwalder, 1970
- Hugo Tschirky, 1968
