= BWI =

BWI may refer to:

- Baltimore/Washington International Airport's IATA code
  - BWI Rail Station, a rail station near the airport
- ISO 639-3 code for Baniwa language of Içana
- Bicycling while intoxicated, considered a form of driving under the influence in some jurisdictions
- BirdWatch Ireland, a conservation organisation
- British West Indies
  - British West Indies Federation's former IOC country code
  - British West Indies dollar (BWI$), a defunct currency
- Building and Wood Workers' International, a global union federation
- BWI Center for Industrial Management, a research institute at ETH Zürich
- Booker Washington Institute, a high school in Kakata, Liberia
- BWI GmbH, IT services provider to the German military etc.
- BeijingWest Industries, supplier of brake and suspension systems
- Bretton Woods Institutions
