= Matthias Troyer =

Austrian physicist

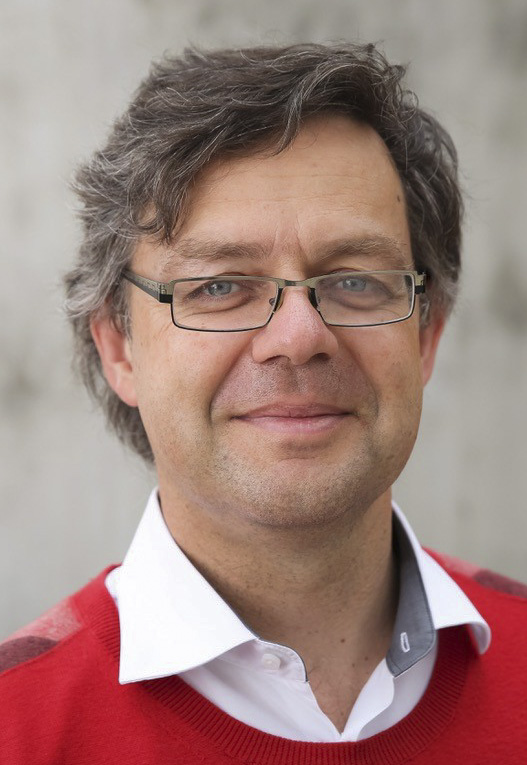
- Born: Matthias Troyer; Linz, Austria
- Education: ETH Zürich Swiss Federal Institute of Technology Zurich; Johannes Kepler Universität Linz
- Awards: APS Fellow (2011); Rahman Prize for Computational Physics of the American Physical Society (2015); Gold medal at the International Chemistry Olympiad (1986); Hamburg Prize for Theoretical Physics (2019); ERC Advanced Grant (2011)
- Scientific career
- Fields: Quantum computing
- Workplaces: Microsoft
- Thesis: Simulation of Constrained Fermions in Low-Dimensional Systems (1994)
- Doctoral advisor: Diethelm Wurtz and Thomas Maurice Rice

Matthias Troyer (born 1968) is an Austrian physicist and computer scientist specializing in quantum computing. He is also Technical Fellow and Corporate Vice President of Quantum at Microsoft.

== Education and career ==
Troyer was born April 18, 1968, in Linz, Austria. He completed University Studies in Technical Physics at the Johannes Kepler Universität Linz, Austria, in 1991 as well as Diploma in Physics and Interdisciplinary PhD thesis at the ETH Zürich Swiss Federal Institute of Technology Zurich in 1994.

His PhD on "Simulation of Constrained Fermions in Low-Dimensional Systems" was completed under Diethelm Wurtz and Thomas Maurice Rice, earning the ETH medal for outstanding doctoral thesis

Following earning his PhD he spent three years as a fellow of the Japanese Society for the Promotion of Sciences at the Institute for Solid State Physics. In 2000, he was awarded an assistant professorship of the Swiss National Science Foundation.

In June 2002 he became associate professor at the ETH Zurich and in 2005 Full Professor of Computational Physics before joining Microsoft's quantum computing program in 2017. He is also an Affiliate Professor at the University of Washington.

He initiated the open-source project ALPS (Algorithms and Libraries for Physics Simulations), to make algorithms in many-body systems accessible to the scientific public.

Troyer develops practical algorithms and applications for quantum computing with high performance computing, including library design, simulations of quantum devices, chemical reactions, neural networks and AI. He also studies simulation algorithms for quantum many body systems, quantum phase transitions, strongly correlated materials, and ultracold quantum gases.

== Honors and awards ==
In 2019, Troyer received the Hamburg Prize for Theoretical Physics.

In 2015, he was awarded the Aneesur Rahman Prize for Computational Physics of the American Physical Society for pioneering work in several seemingly inaccessible areas of the quantum mechanical many-body problem and for making efficient, sophisticated computer programs accessible to the scientific community.

Troyer has been a Fellow of the American Physical Society since 2011.

He is also the president of the Aspen Center for Physics and has been a member since 2004. He is also a board member of the Washington State Academy of Sciences. Troyer received the gold medal at the International Chemistry Olympiad in 1986 and the silver medal in 1985.

== Selected work ==
- Matthias Troyer and Uwe-Jens Wiese. "Computational complexity and fundamental limitations to fermionic simulations." Phys. Rev. Lett. 94, 170201 (2005).
- Philipp Werner, Armin Comanac, Luca de' Medici, Matthias Troyer, and Andrew J. Millis. "Continuous-Time Solver for Quantum Impurity Models." Phys. Rev. Lett. 97, 076405 (2006)
- Emanuel Gull, Andrew J. Millis, Alexander I. Lichtenstein, Alexey N. Rubtsov, Matthias Troyer, and Philipp Werner. "Continuous-time Monte Carlo methods for quantum impurity models." Phys. Rev. Mod. Phys. 83, 349 (2011).
- Troels F. Rønnow, Zhihui Wang, Joshua Job, Sergio Boixo, Sergei V. Isakov, David Wecker, John M. Martinis, Daniel A. Lidar, Matthias Troyer. "Defining and detecting quantum speedup." Science 345, 420 (2014)
- Bettina Heim, Troels F. Rønnow, Sergei V. Isakov, and Matthias Troyer. "Quantum versus Classical Annealing of Ising Spin Glasses." Science 348, 215 (2015)
- A.A. Soluyanov, D. Gresch, Z. Wang, Q.S., Wu, M. Troyer, Xi Dai, and B. A. Bernevig. "A new type of Weyl semimetal." Nature 527, 495 (2015)
- Giuseppe Carleo, Matthias Troyer. "Solving the Quantum Many-Body Problem with Artificial Neural Networks." Science 355, 580 (2017)
- Giacomo Torlai, Guglielmo Mazzola, Juan Carrasquilla, Matthias Troyer, Roger Melko & Giuseppe Carleo. "Neural-network quantum state tomography." Nature Physics 14, 447–450 (2018)
- Torsten Hoefler, Thomas Häner, and Matthias Troyer. "Disentangling Hype from Practicality: On Realistically Achieving Quantum Advantage." Communications of the ACM 66, 5, 82-87 (2023)
