= Rosario González-Férez =

Spanish physicist

Rosario González-Férez is a Spanish physicist. In 2004, she became a professor in the department of Atomic, Molecular and Nuclear Physics at the University of Granada, specializing in not only that but also theoretical and computational physics. She was given the Mildred Dresselhaus Award in 2013, and in 2018 she was appointed to the International Union of Pure and Applied Physics, also known as the IUPAP commission on Atomic, Molecular and Optical Physics.

== Education ==
She received her Degree in Physical Sciences in 1996, University of Granada as well as a PhD in Physical Sciences in 2001, University of Granada. From 2001 to 2004 González took a temporary position located in Germany, Universität Heidelberg. This was funded by the Alexander von Humboldt Foundation. Her postdoctoral development allowed for advanced training and research for PhD graduates like herself. After signing a contract with the Return of Researchers to Andalusian Research Centers program (2004).

From February, 2004 to March, 2008 she was a researcher participating in the Return of Researchers to Andalusian Research Centers, Regional Government of Andalusia. After qualifying for the title of University Professor within the area of knowledge of Atomic, Molecular and Nuclear Physics, she became an associate professor since April, 2008.

Her lines of research include:

- Molecules in electric fields.
- Formation of ultracold molecules.
- Atoms In external fields
- Theoretical measures of information of D-dimensional systems.

== Career ==
Professor González-Férez has since then constructed the Master’s Degree in Physics and Mathematics at the University of Granada (2012-2017). Furthermore, she has been investigating a European Union project and several Spanish projects. In the year 2015 there was an ANEP commissions for a Postdoctoral Training Grants in 2013 and, Ramón y Cajal Program in 2015 which she participated in, these focused on physics, space sciences, and were the leads of the German Research Foundation. Additionally, during the years 2011, 2013, 2015, and 2017 González-Férez assisted in the making of four summer schools at Quantum Matter.

From then she was chosen to be the first and only representative for a Spanish University involving Atomic, Molecular, and Optical Physics. As a researcher of the Atomic, Molecular and Nuclear Physics at the Carlos I Institute of Theoretical and Computational Physics she was then chosen chair for the 2022-2024 C15 Commission of Atomic Molecular Physics and Optics for the IUPAP.

Being first women to become chair of the commission and only spanish female representative, she was designated as the president of the Atomic and Molecular Physics and Optics, formed by 14 people, and will strive to continue improving the groups of Spanish scientists working within Atomic, Molecular Physics and Optics.

Moreover, her knowledge has allowed her to have collaborated in about 130 research papers; The most recent being:

- Molecular influence on nuclear-quadrupole-coupling effects in laser induced alignment
- Women for Quantum -- Manifesto of Values
- Flipping electric dipole in the vibrational wave packet dynamics of carbon monoxide

== Awards ==
In 2013, she was awarded the Mildred Dresselhaus Award. This award is given to individuals who produce outstanding contributions in science and engineering and while at the University of Hamburg González conducted research on molecules in external fields and ultracold molecules which soon granted her with this award.
