= Cristiane de Morais Smith =

Brazilian theoretical physicist

Cristiane de Morais Smith Lehner
- Education: University of Campinas (BSc physics 1985), (MSc, 1989), (PhD, 1994)
- Scientific career
- Fields: Strongly-correlated systems, condensed matter
- Workplaces: University of Utrecht
- Doctoral advisor: Prof. Amir Caldeira, Prof. Gianni Blatter

Cristiane de Morais Smith Lehner is a Brazilian theoretical physicist and professor at the Institute for Theoretical Physics at the University of Utrecht, where she leads a research group studying condensed matter physics, cold atoms and strongly-correlated systems. In 2019, the European Physical Society awarded Morais Smith its Emmy Noether Distinction.

Morais Smith has authored or co-authored over 100 academic papers, including articles in Nature Communications, Physical Review, and Physical Review B, where several of her papers have been recognized as "Editors Choice" and "Scientific Highlights". As of March 2020, her work has received over 2900 citations.

In addition, Morais Smith is an editor for the European Journal of Physics B, which focuses on condensed matter and complex systems.

== Education ==
Morais Smith obtained a physics BSc from University of Campinas in 1985, continuing to complete a MSc with highest honors in 1989 entitled The Effect of the Initial Preparation to Describe the Dynamics of a Quantum Brownian Particle, under her adviser Amir Caldeira. She continued with Caldeira to complete a PhD in 1994, also at University of Campinas entitled Quantum and Classical Creep of Vortices Intrinsically Pinned in High-Temperature Superconductors. Much of the work for her PhD was completed at ETH Zurich where she worked with Gianni Blatter.

== Career ==
Starting in March 1986, Morais Smith was a French language teacher at Brazilian Telecommunications Company (TELEBRAS) in Campinas Brazil, until December 1988, when she briefly became the owner of and teacher at a French language school.

From 1989 to 1994, during her PhD, Morais Smith accepted a permanent lecturer position in the Department of Physics at the São Paulo State University (UNESP) in Bauru, Brazil. During this time, she was also a visiting scientist in the Condensed Matter group at the International Center for Theoretical Physics in Trieste, Italy, as well as a guest PhD student at ETH Zurich.

Following the award of her PhD, she accepted a postdoctoral position at the Institute of Theoretical Physics, also at ETH Zurich. In 1995, she moved to the Institute of Theoretical Physics at the University of Hamburg, Germany as a research assistant. After finishing a post-doc in Hamburg, Morais Smith began working at the Institute of Theoretical Physics at the University of Fribourg, Switzerland, where the Swiss National Science Foundation awarded her the Professor Boursier Fellowship. At the University of Fribourg, she advanced to an associate professor position.

In 2004, Morais Smith was hired by the Utrecht University as a full professor with a chair in condensed matter theory. She is chair of the Condensed Matter Physics department there.

Morais Smith is one of three directors of the Delta Institute for Theoretical Physics (a collaboration between University of Amsterdam, Leiden University, and Utrecht University), where she represents Utrecht University.

== Other ==
Morais Smith grew up in Paraguaçu Paulista, a village 500 km from São Paulo, Brazil. She was thirteen years old when she decided to become a physicist. She is fluent in Portuguese (her native language), English, French, Italian, German, Spanish, and Dutch.

In September 2002, Morais Smith married Stefan Lehner, a Swiss designer.

Morais Smith was featured in a Dutch newspaper article in 2018 for her work on chiral superconductors where the pairing function has a chirality e.g. $p_x + ip_y$. In layered chiral superconductors there is a geometric Meissner effect, which is a variation on the Meissner effect.

== Honors and awards ==
In 2001, Morais Smith was awarded a "Professeur Boursier du Fond National Suisse" or Swiss National Science Foundation Professorship for a project entitled Spontaneous formation of charge patterns in two-dimensional strongly interacting electron systems. This prize is awarded to only 2 or 3 researchers per year, and holds a monetary award of more than one million Swiss Francs.

Morais Smith received a People's Republic of China 'High-End Foreign Expert' Professorship in 2014 and 2015 at the Wilczek Quantum Center, awarded by the State Administration of Foreign Experts Affairs.

In 2016, the Hamburg Centre for Ultrafast Imaging (CUI) awarded its Dresselhaus Prize to Morais Smith for "her outstanding contribution to the understanding of topological phases in two-dimensional atomic and electronic systems".

In 2019, the European Physical Society awarded Morais Smith its EPS Emmy Noether Distinction "for her outstanding contributions to the theory of condensed matter systems and ultracold atoms to unveil novel quantum states of matter." The EPS Emmy Noether Distinction for Women in Physics, established in 2013, is awarded "to enhance the recognition of noteworthy women physicists with a strong connection to Europe through nationality or work," particularly those who are "role models that will help to attract women to a career in physics."
