= Coat of arms of Switzerland =

Versions
- Hatched coat of arms as shown in the 2017 legislation

- The banner of arms, which serves as national flag
- Armiger: Swiss Confederation as well as the following institutions: President of Switzerland; Federal Council; Chancellor of Switzerland; Federal Assembly; Federal courts of Switzerland; Swiss Federal Audit Office; Heads of Swiss diplomatic missions (ambassadors, consuls, etc); Swiss civil law notaries
- Shield: Gules, a Cross couped Argent

The coat of arms of the Swiss Confederation shows the same white-on-red cross as the flag of Switzerland, but on a heraldic shield instead of the square field.

The federal coat of arms (eidgenössisches Wappen) was defined by the Swiss Diet (Tagsatzung) in 1815, for the Restored Confederacy. A more elaborate federal seal was also defined, as the federal coat of arms surrounded by the twenty-two cantonal coats of arms. Similar heraldic arrangements representing the Thirteen Cantons of the Old Swiss Confederacy are on record from the mid-16th century.

The 1815 legislation remained in force in the federal state established in 1848, as was explicitly recognized by the Federal Council in 1889. While the simple coat of arms was in wide use, especially on coins, and from the early 20th century also on car number plates and passports, the full seal did not see official use beyond its representation in stained glass in the Federal Palace of Switzerland (c. 1900).

The 19th-century definition of the federal seal and coat of arms was replaced only in 2017, with the adoption of a new law which defined the Swiss coat of arms as "a Swiss cross in a triangular shield" with fixed proportions, but which no longer recognizes a federal seal.

== Design ==
The 2017 law defines the "Swiss coat of arms" (German: Schweizerwappen) formally the "Coat of Arms of the Swiss Confederation" (German: Wappen der Schweizerischen Eidgenossenschaft, French: armoiries de la Confédération suisse consistent, Italian: stemma della Confederazione Svizzera) as "a Swiss cross in a triangular shield". The Swiss cross (Das Schweizerkreuz, la croix suisse, la croce svizzera) is defined as:"a white, upright, free-standing cross depicted against a red background, whose arms, which are all of equal size, are one-sixth longer than they are wide." The shape of the "triangular shield" is defined by means of an image given in an annex to article 2. The color red to be used is specified in the same annex as:

The coat of arms of Switzerland, corresponding to the CMYK, Hexadecimal, and RGB colours.

Variants of the swiss red found on the coat of arms

Colour scheme
CMYK	0–100–100–0
RGB	255–0–0
Hexadecimal	#FF0000
Pantone	485C or 485U
NCS	S 1085-Y90R
Scotchcal	100 -13
RAL	3020 (Traffic Red)

The triangular shield has been in use by the federal administration since the first half of the 20th century. It is an unusual shape, based on the triangular or "heater" shaped shield of classical heraldry, but with a curved top.

Alternative shapes of the heraldic shield were also in frequent use, and still remain in use in spite of the 2017 legislation. A frequently seen shield shape is the "Iberian" or "curved" type, specifically used to mark Swiss embassies and border crossings, and also used on the five franks coin. Another frequently seen variant is a Renaissance-style articulated shield, shown as being held by the national personification Helvetia on the ½, 1 and 2 franks coins.

== History ==
=== Old Confederacy ===
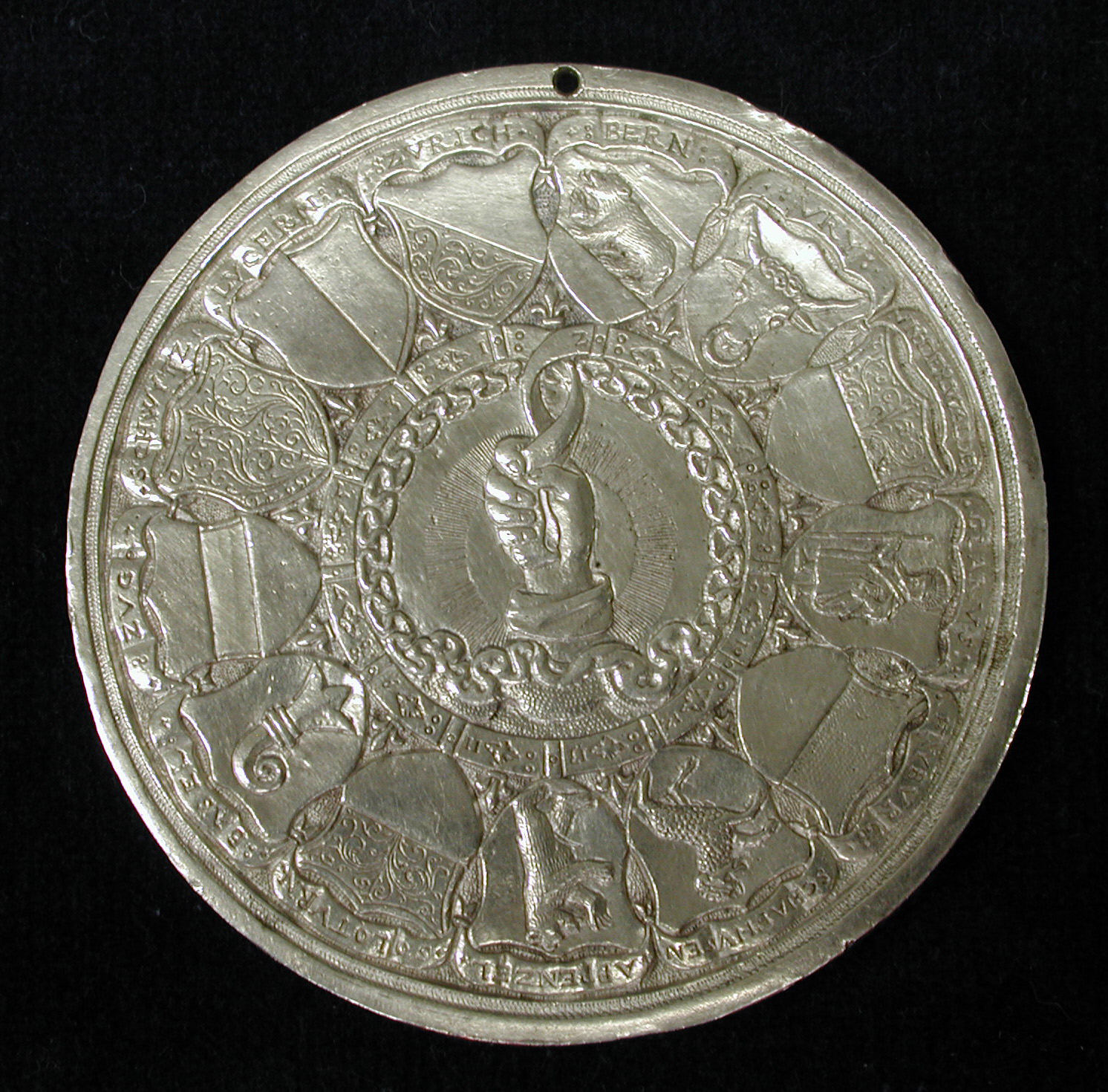
The coats of arms of the Thirteen Cantons as shown on the "baptismal medal" or Patenpfennig presented by the Confederacy to Princess Claude of Valois (by Jacob Stampfer of Zürich (1547).

The Swiss cross originates as a field sign worn by the troops of the Old Swiss Confederacy. Use of the emblem is attested with certainty in the context of the Old Zürich War, for the year 1444, when the Tagsatzung defended itself against allegations that the troops of the Confederacy had deceptively used two different field signs (Heerzeichen). Aegidius Tschudi (Chronik II.390) cites a song containing this allegation, specifying that the Swiss were bearing "two kinds of crosses, white at the back and red in front" (Si trügend zweierlei Crützeren, [...] Hinden wiß und vornen rot) to deceive the Zürich side.

Heraldic representation of the Confederacy was by representations of the cantonal coats of arms. Petermann Etterlin on the title page of his Kronika of 1507 shows the coats of arms of the Thirteen Cantons (besides those of Chur, Valais and St. Gallen) surrounding the imperial coat of arms, reflecting the claim of the cantons of the Confederacy to imperial immediacy within the Holy Roman Empire.

The first known example where the cantonal coats of arms are shown as surrounding a Swiss cross representing the Confederacy is a medal commissioned by the Tagsatzung from Zürich goldsmith Hans Stampfer in 1547 as a gift for the French princess Claude. The obverse side of this medal shows the coats of arms of the Thirteen Cantons in their order of precedence, the reverse shows the coats of arms of the Associates, both groups surrounding a central cross with ornamental foliage. Similar representations are found throughout the early modern period, on commemorative medals and on regimental seals used by Swiss Guards in French service. The first mention of the Confederate Cross (Eidgenossen Crütz) shown in a shield (on pennies minted by Schwyz) dates to 1533.

=== Napoleonic period and Restored Confederacy ===
Seal of the Helvetic Republic, version used by the "smaller council" (Kleiner Rath)

The heraldic emblem used during 1803–1814 as shown (in abbreviation) on cantonal coins

The Napoleonic Helvetic Republic adopted an official seal on 12 May 1798, showing William Tell and his son, holding the apple pierced by the crossbow bolt. This seal disappeared with the dissolution of the Helvetic Republic five years later. The Swiss Confederation established by Napoleon in 1803 adopted the seal, described as "an armed Old Swiss, on whose shield shall be inscribed 'XIX. Kantone', surrounded by the inscription 'Schweizerische Eidgenossenschaft. 1803'".

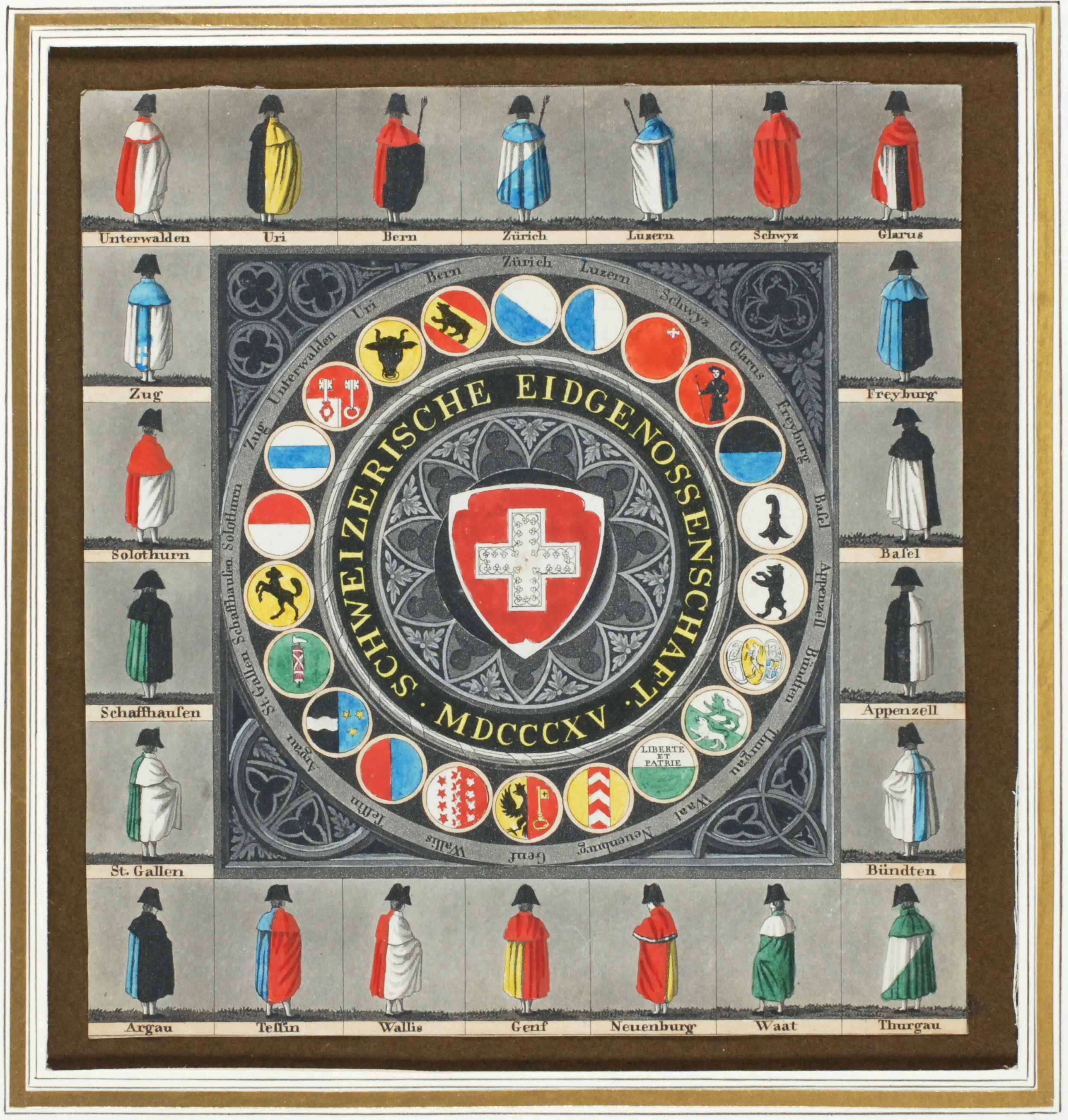
Seal of the Swiss Confederacy as defined by the Tagsatzung in 1815

The Tagsatzung (Swiss Diet) re-introduced the white cross in the red field for the seal of the Confederacy in 1814. The commission for drafting a federal constitution on 16 May 1814 recommended the adoption of a seal of the Confederacy based on the "field sign of the old Swiss". On 4 July 1815, the Diet accepted the design of the commission, adopting it as the provisional seal and describing it as "in the center, the federal red shield with the white cross as common federal heraldic emblem, surrounded by a simple circular Gothic ornament, on the outside of which the inscription 'Schweizerische Eidgenossenschaft' with the year number MDCCCXV, and in an outer circle all XXII cantonal coat of arms in circular fields, according to their federal order of precedence; around all, a simple wreath".

=== Modern Switzerland ===
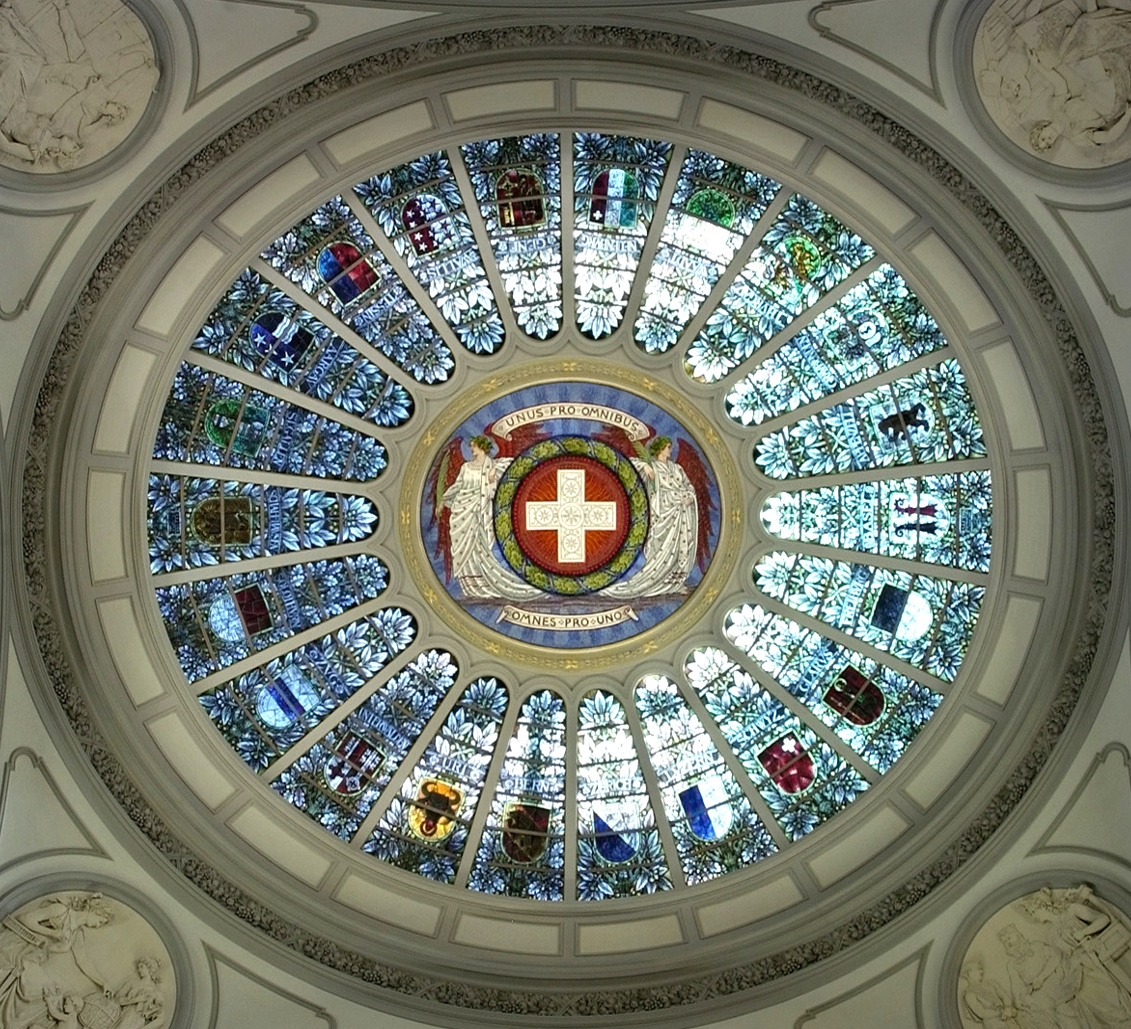
The 22 cantonal coats of arms in the stained glass dome of the Federal Palace of Switzerland (ca. 1900)

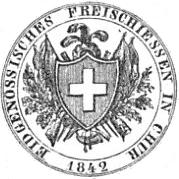
Coat of arms on the obverse of the Schützentaler minted by the Three Leagues for the federal shooting competition of 1842

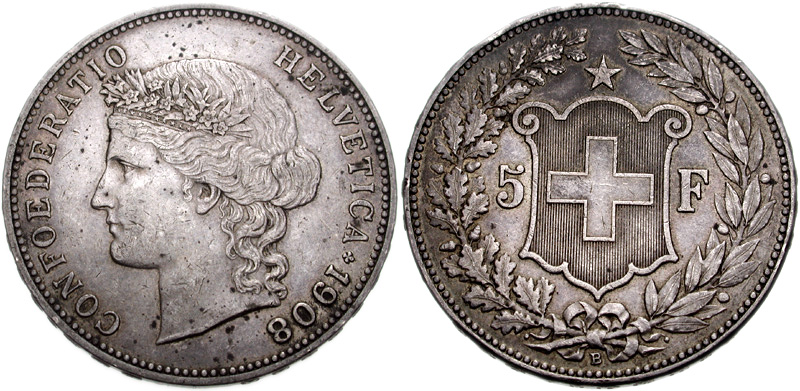
Five francs coin in the design used during 1888–1916

In November 1889, the Federal Council published a "communication regarding the federal coat of arms", detailing the history of the use of the Swiss cross since the 15th century.

Seals produced from 1815 onward, and cantonal coins minted from 1826 showed the arms of the cross in the 7:6 length to width ratio. Later in the 19th century, there was a trend of depicting the cross as composed of five equal squares. The two competing designs were controversially discussed in the late 19th century, especially after the introduction of the new design for the five franks coin, which showed the Swiss coat of arms in a Baroque-style heraldic shield. The Federal Council in 1889 introduced the 7:6 ratio as official. The associated communication explains that "our heraldic cross is not a mathematical figure, but at the same the Christian cross symbol and the field sign of the Old Confederacy". The 1889 law avoids specification of the shape of the shield, the omission being explained in the communication as deliberate, in order to avoid prejudicing the ongoing controversy, and in order to enable the shape of the shield to be left to the "tastes of the current time and practical necessity". The legislation, passed on 12 December 1889 (SR 111), explicitly invokes the Tagsatzung decision of 1815 as retaining validity, with the only addition of specifying the proportions of the cross, the four arms having equal length, in a ratio to their width of 7:6.

In the 1850 series of the Swiss franc coins, the small denominations (1, 2, 5, 10 and 20 centimes) had a coat of arms with floral ornaments, while the larger denominations (½, 1, 2 and 5 francs) showed a seated Helvetia figure holding a triangular shield on which the Swiss cross was displayed within an oval shape. The coat of arms in the denominations 5, 10 and 20 centimes was replaced by a female head (Liberty) in 1881. In the 1 and 2 centimes coins, the coat of arms was replaced by a simple Swiss cross in 1948. For the ½, 1, and 2 francs coins, the seated Helvetia was replaced by her standing figure in 1875. The 1888 five franks coin showed a coat of arms with a heraldic shield in a shape inspired by Baroque cartouche designs. The 1922 design of the five franks coin introduced a simplified shield of the rounded "Iberian" type.

The Model 1900/06 Parabellum pistol ("Swiss Luger") had a Swiss cross engraved on the top of the chamber. The Swiss cross was represented as "in splendor" in the batches produced during 1906–1908, and in a heraldic shield from 1909. The heraldic shield was of the "baroque" type, with an engrailed top, in the 1900/06 models produced from 1909–1914 by Deutsche Waffen- und Munitionsfabriken (DWM). The coat of arms is no longer present in the model 1900/06 batches produced by Waffenfabrik Bern during 1918–1933. The Swiss coat of arms is again present on the Model 1929 Parabellum pistol made by Waffenfabrik Bern during 1933–1947, now with a triangular shield. Ordnance pistols produced for the army, models SIG Sauer P210 (1949–1975) and SIG Sauer P220 (from 1975) continued to have the Swiss coat of arms with triangular shield engraved on the slide, rendered in simple outline (without hatching of the shield).

The representation of the Swiss coat of arms in a convex triangular shield representing the federal administration is a tradition introduced in the early 20th century. This special shield shape had no official force prior to the adoption as "logo" in 2005, but it came to be used de facto as emblem by the federal authorities from the 1930s, shown on Swiss passports during 1932–1984 (the passport of 1915 still showed a coat of arms with a "French" style shield in a wreath on its first page). Early Swiss car registration plates, introduced in 1905, showed coats of arms with articulate "Baroque" shields. Beginning in 1933, this design was replaced by simplified a shield shape of the "triangular" type with vertical sides, with slight design variations between cantons.

== Use by the federal administration ==
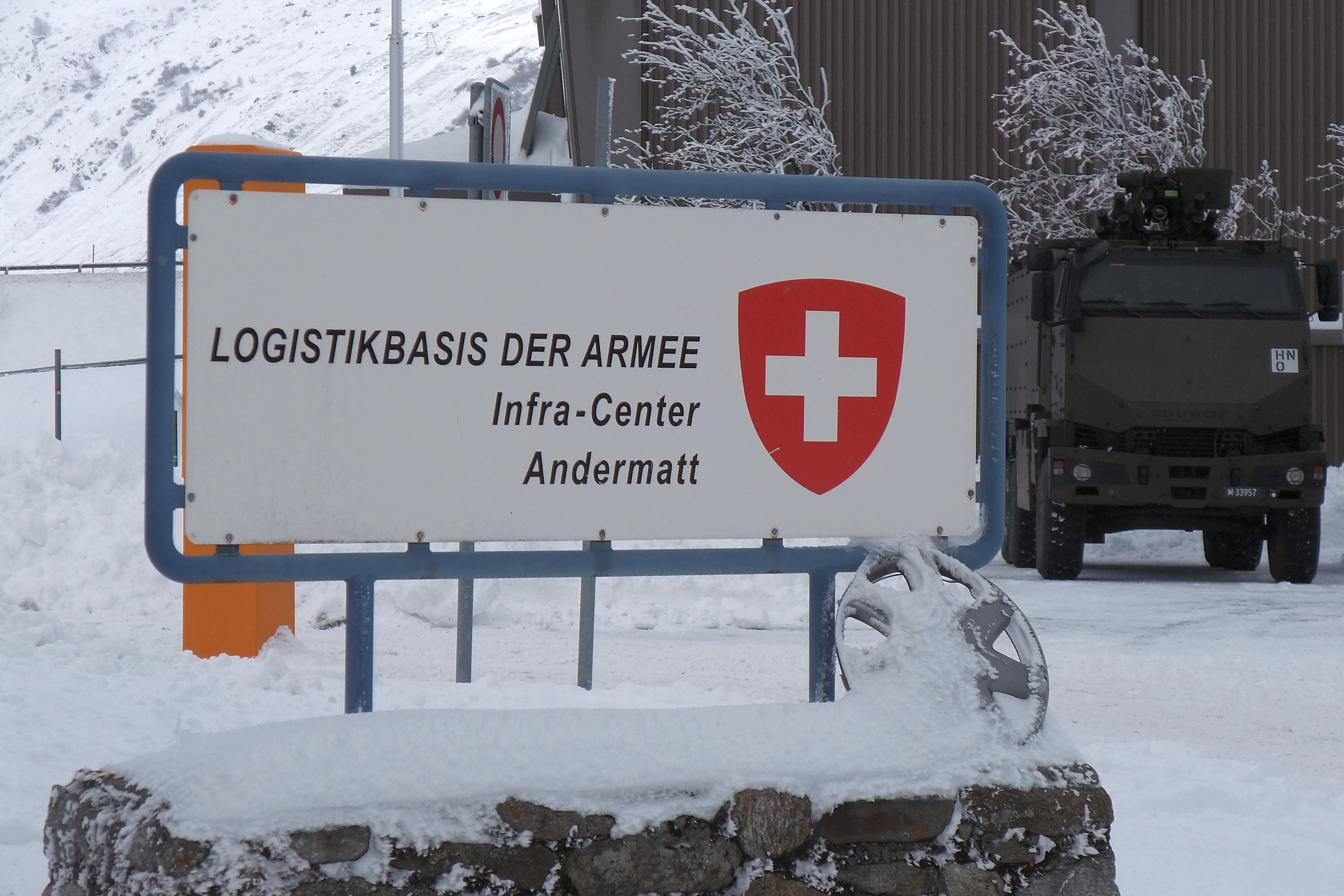
Coat of arms of Switzerland used by army

The 2005 logo used by the Swiss federal administration

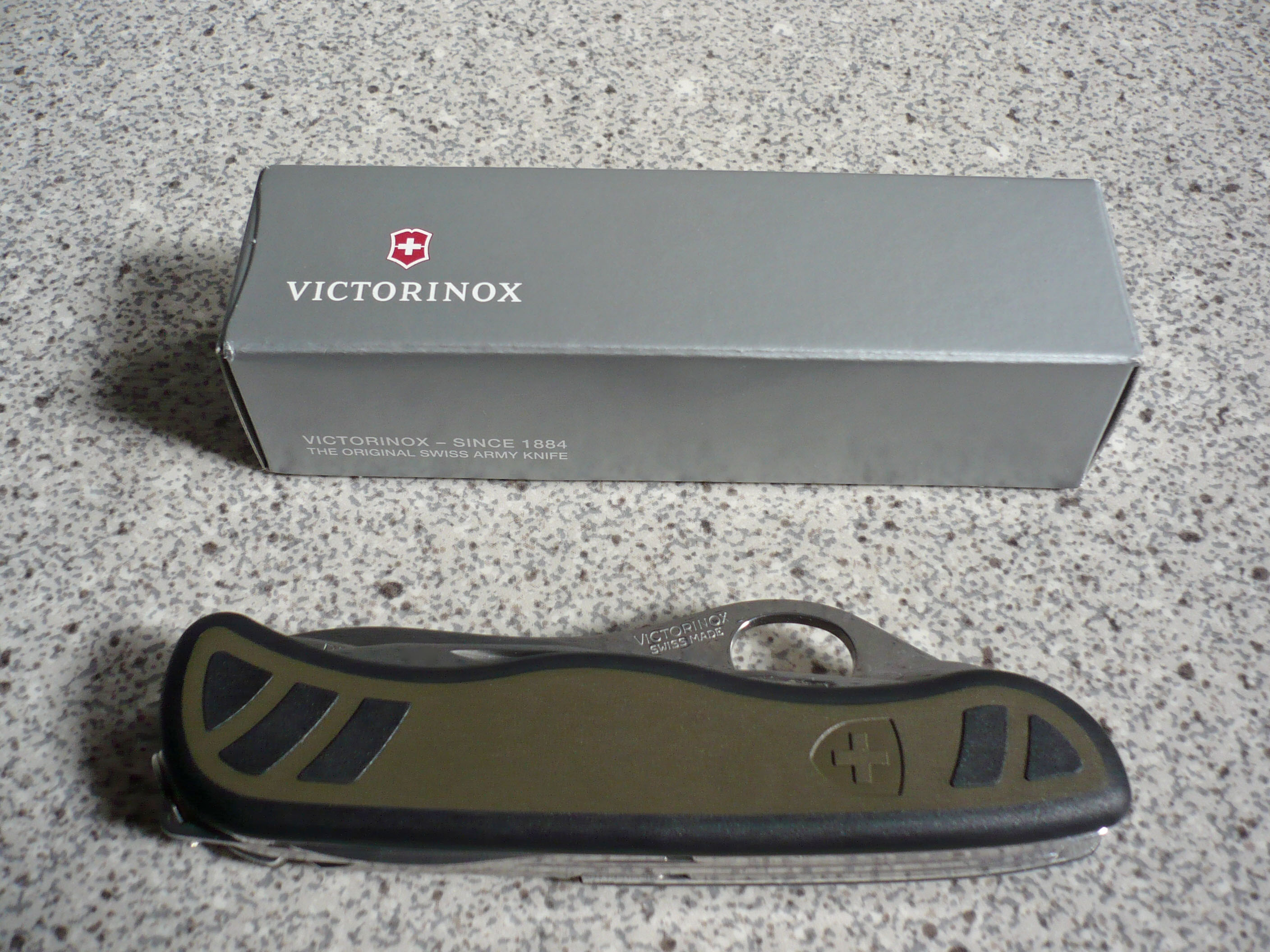
A Swiss army knife — the soldier knife (Soldatenmesser) issued by the Swiss Armed Forces (2008 model). The cardboard box shows the Swiss coat of arms used in the company logo by the manufacturer, Victorinox, while relief depicted on one grip on the knife itself is the coat of arms used by the federal authorities.

The Federal Council in 2004 announced the introduction of a "corporate design" in the sense of a contemporary logo, to be used by all organs of the federal administration. Adoption by the Federal Council itself was announced for 2005, with adoption to be complete by all of the federal administration by the end of 2006, with a projected cost of CHF 25 million. The logo consists of the Swiss coat of arms in convex triangular shield alongside the name "Swiss Confederacy" in the four national languages in black Frutiger Light typeset. Provision is made for using white script and adding a white line surrounding the coat of arms in cases where the logo is printed on red or black backgrounds.

In keeping with the new logo, a new law was passed in 2017, known as Wappenschutzgesetz (WSchG, SR 232.21). This law replaces a 1931 law on the protection of federal, cantonal and foreign heraldic emblems. While the older law did not contain any specifications as to federal emblems, the new law specifies the "Swiss coat of arms" and the "Swiss flag", including two images in an annex, declared as authoritative in the text of the law, so that the federal "Swiss coat of arms" is now defined as a Swiss cross in a convex triangular shield. The 2017 law thus also renders obsolete the 1815 definition of the federal coat of arms and its 1889 confirmation, SR 111 being marked as abrogated per 1 January 2017. The image of the coat of arms shown in the document shows the hatching indicating heraldic tincture (red or gules indicated by vertical hatching) which has traditionally been used in black-and-white representations of the coat of arms throughout the 20th century. By contrast, the "corporate design" manual used by the federal administration specifies that no such hatching is to be shown in black-and-white representations of the logo, the red shield instead being shown in solid black. In spite of the more restrictive 2017 definition of the "Swiss coat of arms", other styles of heraldic shield remain in official use, specifically on coins and number plates.

A number of regulations passed along with the new flag law, also in force from 2017, restricted the commercial use of the Swiss cross. Dubbed the "Swissness regulation" (Swissness-Verordnung), these changes were originally proposed in 2006 by national councillor Jasmin Hutter and state councillor Anita Fetz, and eventually implemented in five separate regulations. Numerous exceptions were granted to companies who have historically used the Swiss cross, such as Swiss army knife producer Victorinox (uses the federal coat of arms as company logo since 1909).

== See also ==
- Flag of Switzerland
- Flags and arms of cantons of Switzerland
- Flags and arms of municipalities of Switzerland
