= Shaul Mukamel =

Israeli chemist

- Born: 11 December 1948 (age 77); Baghdad, Iraq
- Education: Tel Aviv University
- Known for: Nonlinear Optics, attosecond spectroscopy
- Awards: Willis E. Lamb Award
- Scientific career
- Fields: Physical Chemistry
- Workplaces: Tel Aviv University; Massachusetts Institute of Technology; University of California, Berkeley; Rice University; Weizmann Institute of Science; University of Rochester; University of California, Irvine

Shaul Mukamel (born 11 December 1948) is a chemist and physicist, currently serving as a distinguished professor at the University of California, Irvine. He is known for his works in nonlinear optics and spectroscopy.

== Early life and education ==
Shaul Mukamel was born in Baghdad, Iraq on December 11, 1948. Mukamel received his B.Sc. degree in 1969, with the distinction cum laude and his M.Sc. and Ph.D., both summa cum laude, in 1971 and 1976 respectively from Tel Aviv University. His Masters supervisor was Uzi Kaldor. He finished his PhD working under Joshua Jortner. Following graduation, Mukamel served as postdoc at MIT and the University of California, Berkeley.

== Career ==
Mukamel has worked at Rice University and the Weizmann Institute before joining University of Rochester, where he worked from 1982 to 2003. He has been at University of California, Irvine since then.

Mukamel is known for his work in the field of nonlinear optics, especially the time domain extensions which culminated in the book entitled Principles of Nonlinear Optical Spectroscopy (1995). His works covers topics ranging from excitons to multi-dimensional spectroscopy, and femto– and attosecond spectroscopy. During his career, he has published more than 1000 scientific papers.

Mukamel has received prizes and distinctions including the Alexander von Humboldt Research Award, the Hamburg Prize for Theoretical Physics, and the Ahmed Zewail ACS Award in Ultrafast Science and Technology.

== Awards and honors ==
- 1987 – Fellow of the American Physical Society
- 1996 – Guggenheim Fellowship
- 2003 – Ellis R. Lippincott Award
- 2011 – Earle K. Plyler Prize for Molecular Spectroscopy
- 2012 – Hamburg Prize for Theoretical Physics
- 2013 – Willis E. Lamb Award
- 2013 – Member of the American Academy of Arts and Sciences
- 2015 – Member of the National Academy of Sciences
- 2017 – William F. Meggers Award in Spectroscopy
