= Hugo Tschirky =

Swiss scientist (1938–2020)

- Hugo Tschirky (1997)
- Born: 20 January 1938; St. Gallen, Switzerland
- Died: 10 October 2020 (aged 82)

Hugo Tschirky (20 January 1938 – 10 October 2020) was a Swiss scientist in the field of management science. He contributed mainly to the emerging disciplines of technology management and innovation study. Tschirky's activities in research and industry span throughout Europe, Japan and the United States.

== Life ==
Hugo Tschirky was born in St. Gallen, Switzerland. He graduated as a mechanical engineer with a specialization in process, control and nuclear engineering, and received his Ph.D. in nuclear reactor technology from the Swiss Federal Institute of Technology in Zürich, Switzerland, in 1968. He acquired a second Ph.D. in business administration in 1978.

From 1968 to 1971, Tschirky worked as an engineer at the General Atomics Research Lab in San Diego on questions regarding the safety of fast breeder reactors. After that, he spent eleven years in CEO positions at the Swiss subsidiary of the optics company Carl Zeiss AG (1971 to 1975) and at Cerberus AG (1975 to 1982), the renowned Swiss manufacturer of ionization smoke detectors.

In 1982, Tschirky was appointed professor of Science of Management at the Department of Management, Technology and Economics at the Swiss Federal Institute of Technology in Zürich. From 1999, he also co-chaired the BWI Center for Industrial Management (at the time, the Center for Enterprise Sciences), where he was responsible for the postgraduate study program. In 1992 and 2000, Tschirky spent sabbaticals teaching and working at the Tokyo Institute of Technology and at the Massachusetts Institute of Technology (MIT).

Parallel to his teaching and research activities, Tschirky has acted as expert council in a number of affairs of national and international significance. Among them were the creation of the Swiss Paul Scherrer Institute, and the legal dispute between Iran and the French company Eurodif that centered around Iran's $1 billion loan for the construction of a uranium enrichment plant in Pierrelatte. After the collapse of the Shah's government, Iran had withdrawn from the nuclear cooperation program with Western countries, and sued Eurodif for reimbursement of its 10% share in the company. Ongoing from 1979, the matter was finally resolved in 1991. In 2005, Tschirky became a member of the «International Visiting Committee» at the University of Cambridge Department of Engineering. Chaired by Lord Alec Broers, the committee's 14 representatives from universities and industry had been appointed to advise the department in strategy matters.

Tschirky has maintained close ties to the business world by serving as a board member of various companies, among them Canon Switzerland, Jelmoli, Novartis Research Foundation, BB-Industrie, Dräger Safety Schweiz AG, Unilever Schweiz AG, Bavaria Auto AG, Business Results AG, new medical technologies AG, ATV Advanced Technology Ventures AG, Connex Verkehr AG, Helbling Management Consulting AG, SONAC Inc (Japan), Global Advanced Technology Innovation Consortium (GATIC) (founder, 2002), and GATIC Japan KK. His mandates in 2018 were LogObject AG, Swiss 3D Tec AG, Swiss Blue Energy AG, and MSI Dr. Wälti AG.

Tschirky has served in the Swiss Armed Forces as a mountain infantry militia officer, completing his service as colonel. As long-time head of the Geb AK3 mountain army corps' train troop, he was involved in the “Armee 95” reorganization, advocating for preservation of the horse train. From 1982, Tschirky was a member of the Swiss Federal Armament Commission, and acted as the commission's president from 1999 until 2004.

== Work ==
Tschirky has contributed to management theory with a focus on the management of technological change and innovation. Motivated by a perceived lack of recognition for technology issues in other approaches of general management, he developed the concept of integrated technology management and extended it to 'enterprise science', proposing that the management of technology-intensive companies must be informed by all relevant sciences, and particularly by technology awareness. Tschirky has also worked on the related topics of technology forecasting, technology acquisition and technology marketing, and he authored and edited studies on technology management practices in Japanese companies. Tschirky has also worked on 'structured creativity', which proposes theoretical foundations and an applicable code of practice for efficient innovation management in innovation-driven enterprises.

Tschirky's works have been published in German, English, Japanese and Russian language. Through his long-standing research and teaching activities at several Japanese universities (Tokyo Institute of Technology, Japan Advanced Institute of Science and Technology, Ritsumeikan University, National Graduate Institute for Policy Studies and Tohoku University) as well as his counseling and boardroom work for Japanese companies, Tschirky is known and respected in Japan. Between 2007 and 2012, he acted as council of the president of the United Nations University in Tokyo.

During his years at the Swiss Federal Institute of Technology, Tschirky has advised many young scientists on their doctoral and postdoctoral work. He was the main initiator of EITIM, the European Institute for Technology and Innovation Management, a network of technical universities across Europe. EITIM was founded in 2000 and aimed to improve European innovation capacity through joint research and publication projects, jointly supervised dissertations, executive seminars and conferences.

Since becoming professor emeritus in 2003, Tschirky has continued teaching. He has taught Executive Management programs at the ETH Zürich and at the Tokyo Institute of Technology, the Japan Advanced Institute of Science and Technology and he gave regular lectures at the Jožef Stefan International Postgraduate School in Slovenia until 2011.

== Selected publications ==
Books

- 1998: Technologie-Management: Idee und Praxis H. Tschirky, S. Koruna. Verlag Industrielle Organisation, Zürich.
- 2003: Technology and Innovation Management on the Move: From Managing Technology to Managing Innovation-Driven Enterprises H. Tschirky, P. Savioz & H.-H. Jung. Verlag Industrielle Organisation, Zürich
- 2006: Structured Creativity. Formulating an Innovation Strategy T. Sauber, H. Tschirky. Palgrave Macmillan, New York
- 2006: Management of Technology and Innovation in Japan C. Herstatt, C. Stockstrom, H. Tschirky, A. Nagahira. Springer, Berlin Heidelberg New York
- 2007: Sustained Innovation Management: Assimilating Radical and Incremental Innovation Management G. Trauffler, H. Tschirky. Palgrave Macmillan. New York
- 2011: Managing Innovation Driven Companies: Approaches in Practice H. Tschirky, C. Herstatt, D. Probert, H. G. Gemünden, T. Durand, P. C. de Weerd-Nederhof, T. Schweisfurth. Palgrave Macmillan, New York

Articles

- 1966: "Berechnung von Resonanzintegralen für einen nichtasymptotischen Moderatorfluss und eine nichtuniforme Temperaturverteilung im Spaltstoff" Tschirky, H., and W. Hälg. Zeitschrift für Angewandte Mathematik und Physik, vol. 17, no. 3, pp. 486–486.
- 1971: "A Gas-Cooled Fast Reactor Core Model for the Analysis of Severe Accidents, with Applicability to LMFBRs" Tschirky, H.P. Nuclear Engineering and Design, vol. 16, no. 3, pp. 358–368.
- 1994: "The Role of Technology Forecasting and Assessment in Technology Management" Tschirky, H.P. R & D Management, vol. 24, no. 2, pp. 121–129.
- 2000: "Technology Marketing: A New Core Competence of Technology-Intensive Enterprises" Tschirky, H., et al. International Journal of Technology Management, vol. 20, no. 3-4, pp. 459–474.
- 2000: "Integrated Framework for a Holistic Approach to Technology Management" Tschirky, H., et al. International Journal of Technology Management, vol. 19, no. 3-5, pp. 357–367.
- 2003: "Bringing Technology to the Boardroom: What does it mean?" H. Tschirky. In: Bringing Technology into the Boardroom. Strategy, Innovation and Competences for Business Value European Institute for Technology and Innovation Management. Palgrave Macmillan New York, p. 19-46
- 2004: "Integration Planning for Technology Intensive Acquisitions" Bannert, V., and H. Tschirky. R & D Management, vol. 34, no. 5, pp. 481–494.
- 2005: "How to Transfer Discontinuous Technology into Radical Innovation – Some Evidence from Three Nanotech Cases" Trauffler, G., Herstatt, C., and H. Tschirky International Journal of Technology Intelligence and Planning, vol. 1, no. 4, p. 357.
