= Caterina Vozzi =

Italian physicist

- Education: University of Milan
- Scientific career
- Workplaces: Consiglio Nazionale delle Ricerche Istituto di Fotonica e Nanotecnologie; University of Milan; National Research Council Canada Steacie Institute

Caterina Vozzi is an Italian physicist, Director of the Istituto di Fotonica e Nanotecnologie at Consiglio Nazionale delle Ricerche. Her research considers the ultrafast dynamics of molecules and solids. She holds a European Research Council grant to develop spectroscopic probes for complex molecules. She was awarded the Millie Dresselhaus Professorship in 2020.

== Early life and education ==
Vozzi was an undergraduate student and graduate researcher at the University of Milan. She joined the National Research Council, where she spent four years as a postdoctoral researcher. She worked alongside Paul Corkum at the National Research Council Canada Steacie Institute for Molecular Sciences.

== Research and career ==
She joined the Consiglio Nazionale delle Ricerche Istituto di Fotonica e Nanotecnologie in 2009, where she became a Senior Researcher in 2010 and Research Director in 2019. She develops time-resolved spectocopy techniques (XUV, X-ray and Terahertz time-domain spectroscopy) to understand ultrafast dynamics in molecules and materials. Based on table-top harmonic generation, she has created new sources for ultrashort (attosecond) pulses for transient absorption spectroscopy that are in the soft X-ray range. She uses table-top high harmonic generation. Measurements with these pulses give temporal and spatial information about dynamic processes, and are sensitive to specific oxidation/spin states or elements. X-ray measurements near specific absorption edges (e.g. the Carbon K-edge) provides information of the structural and electronic environment of atoms within the sample. Between 2005 and 2017, Vozzi was a contract Professor of Physics at Politecnico di Milano.

Single-cycle coherent terahertz pulses can be generated using nonlinear crystals and infrared laser pulses. THz pulses are detected (amplitude, phase) using electro-optic systems and the Pockels effect. These measurements provide information about the dielectric response (real and imaginary), uncovering physical and chemical information.

Vozzi has used optical parametric amplification to create high energy mid-IR light sources for attosecond science. These provide mJ energy, pulse durations equivalent to a few optical cycles and carrier–envelope phase stability, making them ideal for high harmonic generation. She has exploited high harmonic generation to create bright XUV sources. She showed that high harmonic generation tomography and laser-induced electron diffraction to perform time-resolved dynamic imaging of complex molecular materials. Single attosecond pulses in the few hundred eV spectral region) can be generated by manipulating the laser polarisation.

== Select publications ==
- G. Sansone; E. Benedetti; F. Calegari; et al. (1 October 2006). "Isolated single-cycle attosecond pulses". Science. 314 (5798): 443–446. Bibcode:2006Sci...314..443S. doi:10.1126/science.1132838. ISSN 0036-8075. PMID 17053142. Wikidata Q62522074.
- I. J. Sola; E. Mével; L. Elouga; et al. (23 April 2006). "Controlling attosecond electron dynamics by phase-stabilized polarization gating". Nature Physics. 2 (5): 319–322. Bibcode:2006NatPh...2..319S. doi:10.1038/nphys281. ISSN 1745-2473. Wikidata Q62522062.
- C. Vozzi; M. Negro; F. Calegari; G. Sansone; M. Nisoli; S. De Silvestri; S. Stagira (26 June 2011). "Generalized molecular orbital tomography". Nature Physics. 7 (10): 822–826. Bibcode:2011NatPh...7..822V. doi:10.1038/nphys2029. ISSN 1745-2473. Wikidata Q62521967.
