= Chris H. Greene =

American physicist

Chris H. Greene is an American physicist and the Albert Overhauser Distinguished Professor of Physics and Astronomy at Purdue University. He was elected a member of the National Academy of Sciences in 2019.

== Early life and education ==
Greene was born in 1954 in Lincoln, Nebraska. He earned a bachelor of science in physics from the University of Nebraska–Lincoln in 1976. He entered the graduate program at the University of Chicago, earning a master's degree in 1977 and a doctorate in 1980. His thesis, under Ugo Fano, was titled "Doubly-excited states of the alkaline earth atoms". He spent a postdoctoral year at Stanford University working with Richard Zare.

== Career ==
In 1981, Greene was appointed assistant professor of physics at Louisiana State University. He was promoted to associate professor in 1984 and full professor in 1988. He accepted a position at the University of Colorado, Boulder, in 1989 as professor of physics. Greene held various leadership positions during his tenure there including director of the Center for Theoretical Atomic, Molecular, and Optical Physics at JILA and the University of Colorado (1991–1999), JILA fellow (1989–2012), JILA chair (2005–2006), and Arts and Science Professor of Distinction (2011–2012). While at the University of Colorado, he was elected chair of the Division of Atomic, Molecular, and Optical Physics (DAMOP) of the American Physical Society in 2002-2003. In 2012, he was appointed distinguished professor of physics and astronomy at Purdue University, subsequently titled the Albert Overhauser Distinguished Professor of Physics and Astronomy.

== Awards and honors ==
- 1990 Fellow of the American Physical Society
- 1991 I. I. Rabi Award of the American Physical Society
- 2007 University of California at Berkeley, Visiting Miller Professorship
- 2007 Alexander von Humboldt Research Award for Senior U.S. Scientists
- 2010 Davisson–Germer Prize in Atomic or Surface Physics of the American Physical Society
- 2013 Hamburg Prize for Theoretical Physics
- 2019 Elected member, National Academy of Sciences
