= Amir Caldeira =

Brazilian physicist (born 1950)

Amir Ordacgi Caldeira (born 1950 in Rio de Janeiro) is a Brazilian physicist. He received his bachelor's degree in 1973 from the Pontifícia Universidade Católica do Rio de Janeiro, his M.Sc. degree in 1976 from the same university, and his Ph.D. in 1980 from University of Sussex. His Ph.D. advisor was the Physics Nobel Prize winner Anthony James Leggett. He joined the faculty at Universidade Estadual de Campinas (UNICAMP) in 1980. In 1984 he did post-doctoral work at the Kavli Institute for Theoretical Physics (KITP) at University of California, Santa Barbara and at the Thomas J. Watson Research Laboratory at IBM. In 1994–1995 he spent a sabbatical at the University of Illinois at Urbana-Champaign. He is currently a full professor at Universidade Estadual de Campinas. He was the recipient of the Wataghin Prize, from Universidade Estadual de Campinas, for his contributions to theoretical physics in 1986.

Caldeira's research interests are in theoretical condensed matter physics, in particular quantum dissipation and strongly correlated electron systems. His best known work is on the Caldeira–Leggett model, which is one of the first and most important treatments of decoherence in quantum mechanical systems.

== Selected Scientific Articles ==
- Caldeira, A. O.; Leggett, A. J. (1985-02-01). "Influence of damping on quantum interference: An exactly soluble model". Physical Review A. 31 (2). American Physical Society (APS): 1059–1066. Bibcode:1985PhRvA..31.1059C. doi:10.1103/physreva.31.1059. ISSN 0556-2791. PMID 9895586.
- Caldeira, A.O; Leggett, A.J (1983). "Quantum tunnelling in a dissipative system". Annals of Physics. 149 (2). Elsevier BV: 374–456. Bibcode:1983AnPhy.149..374C. doi:10.1016/0003-4916(83)90202-6. ISSN 0003-4916.
- Caldeira, A.O.; Leggett, A.J. (1983). "Path integral approach to quantum Brownian motion". Physica A: Statistical Mechanics and Its Applications. 121 (3). Elsevier BV: 587–616. Bibcode:1983PhyA..121..587C. doi:10.1016/0378-4371(83)90013-4. ISSN 0378-4371.
- Caldeira, A. O.; Leggett, A. J. (1981-01-26). "Influence of Dissipation on Quantum Tunneling in Macroscopic Systems". Physical Review Letters. 46 (4). American Physical Society (APS): 211–214. Bibcode:1981PhRvL..46..211C. doi:10.1103/physrevlett.46.211. ISSN 0031-9007.
- Castro Neto, A. H.; Caldeira, A. O. (1991-10-07). "New model for dissipation in quantum mechanics". Physical Review Letters. 67 (15). American Physical Society (APS): 1960–1963. Bibcode:1991PhRvL..67.1960C. doi:10.1103/physrevlett.67.1960. ISSN 0031-9007. PMID 10044299.

== See also ==
- Cristiane de Morais Smith
