= Mikhail Katsnelson =

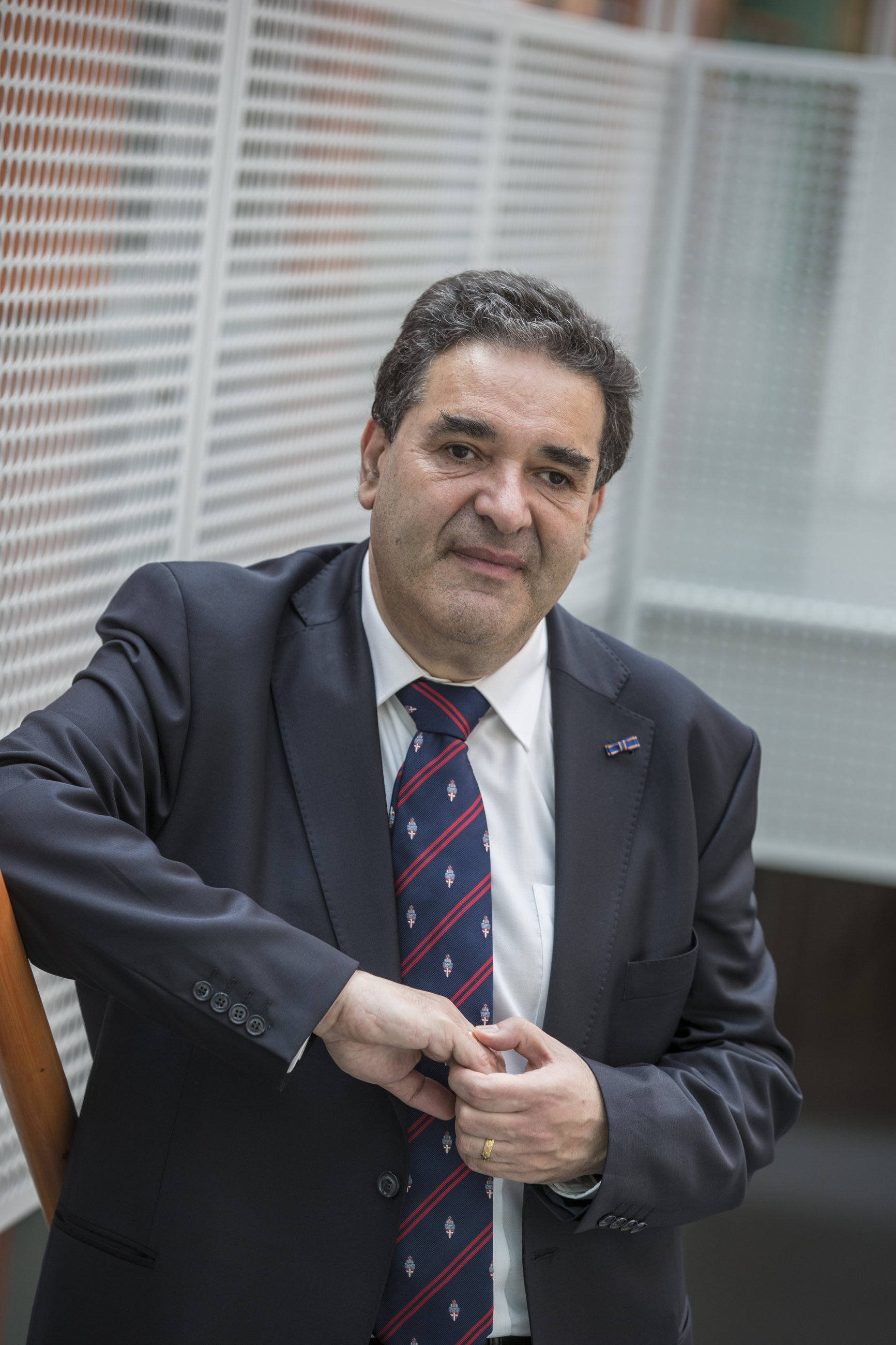
- Born: August 10, 1957 (age 69); Magnitogorsk, Russia
- Education: Ural State University; Institute of Metal Physics
- Awards: Hamburg Prize for Theoretical Physics (2016); Spinoza Prize (2013); Knight of the Order of the Netherlands Lion (2011)
- Scientific career
- Fields: Physics
- Workplaces: Radboud University Nijmegen

Mikhail Iosifovich Katsnelson (Russian: Михаил Иосифович Кацнельсон; born 10 August 1957) is a Russian-Dutch professor of theoretical physics. He works at Radboud University Nijmegen where he specializes in theoretical solid-state physics and many-body quantum physics. He is one of the most cited scientists in the field of condensed matter physics. Katsnelson retired as a professor in 2024.

== Early life ==
Katsnelson was born in Magnitogorsk, Russia. From 1972 to 1977 he attended and then graduated from the Ural State University in Sverdlovsk. In 1980 he obtained his Ph.D. from Institute of Metal Physics in the same place where his advisor was Serghey V. Vonsovsky. In 1985 he defended his thesis for his Doctor of Science degree called Strong electron correlations in transition metals, their alloys and compounds and from 1990 to 1998 became Max-Planck-Institute visiting professor.

== Career ==
From 2004 to 2007 Katsnelson worked with many Russian and Dutch physicists on the nitrogen dioxide and discovered that its closed shell dimer N_{2}O_{4} creates only weak doping which is also known as density of states in a graphene. He also discovered that density of states is ideal for chemical sensing and explained its single molecule detection. On 23 September 2007 he along with Annalisa Fasolino have proven that chemical bonding in carbon is caused by setting ripples' thermal fluctuations to 80 angstroms. In 2010 Katsnelson worked with physicists from India such as Rashid Jalil, Rahul R. Nair, and nanotechnologist Fredrik Schedin of University of Manchester and have discovered that fluorine atoms are attached to the carbon of the graphene, therefore creating a new version called fluorographene that can be stable in the air with a temperature of 400 °C (752 °F). In 2012 he and his colleagues have used prototype device which contained graphene heterojunctions which was combined with either thin boron nitride or molybdenum disulfide which was used as a vertical transport barrier. During the experiment, the room temperature was set from ≈50 and ≈10,000 and they prove that using such prototypes is beneficial for high-frequency operations and large-scale integrations.

Since 2014 Katsnelson is member of the Royal Netherlands Academy of Arts and Sciences. Katsnelson retired as a professor in 2024.

== Awards ==
- Lenin Komsomol Prize (1988)
- Knight of the Order of the Netherlands Lion (2011)
- Spinoza Prize (2013)
- Hamburg Prize for Theoretical Physics (2016)
