= Jakob Stampfer =

Ancient German Goldsmith

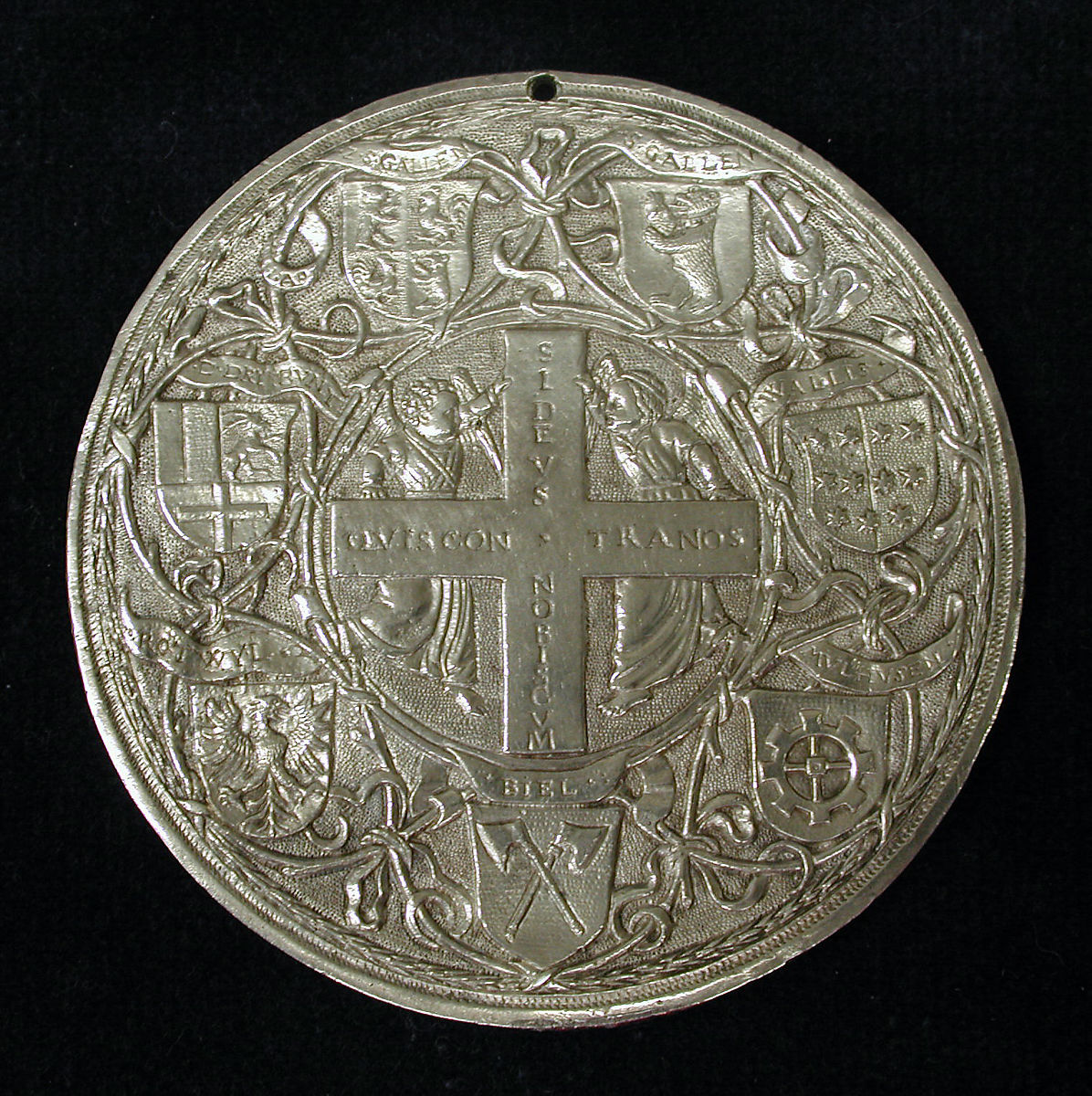
Stampfer's depiction of the Swiss cross on the reverse of the Patenpfennig of 1547.

Hans Jakob Stampfer (1505/6 – 2 July 1579) was a gold smith and medalist of Zürich in the age of Bullinger (antistes 1531–1575). He was the son of gold smith Hans Ulrich Stampfer and of Regula Funk and learned the same trade both from his father and as wandering journeyman in Germany, probably including Augsburg (Meyer 1871 mentions a strong influence by German medalist Friedrich Hagenauer, who was in Augsburg during 1526–1532). Stampfer returned to Zürich in 1531 (the year of the death of Zwingli). He is recorded as a member of the Kämbel guild in 1533, and as the guild's representative in the city council in 1544. He acted as the city's assayer from 1539. Zürich issued a thaler coin minted by Stampfer, the so-called Stampfertaler, during 1555–1560. He married Margaretha von Schönau (d. 1555). He was reeve of Wädenswil during 1570 to 1577.

At least 26 distinct medals by Stampfer are known, not including his production of coins for circulation, made during the period of 1531 to 1566. Most of his medals bear the monogram I·S. His most famous works are the Bundestaler (1546), with an early representation of the Three Confederates, and one of the earliest representations of the coats of arms of the Thirteen Cantons and of the Swiss cross, and the Patenpfennig for Princess Claude (1547). He made various commemorative portrait medals, of Huldrych Zwingli (1531), of Nicholas of Flüe (c. 1540), among others, and medals with religious and allegorical themes such as the conversion of Paul, the Annunciation, Faith, Hope and Charity and Fortuna.

Jacob Stampfer was the first member of a "dynasty" of medalists that remained active in Zürich until the 1680s. One Hans Ulrich Stampfer, possibly a brother of Jacob's, is recorded as active during 1561–1579. Hans, possibly another brother, died in 1586. Hans Ulrich Stampfer, son of Jacob (1562–1640) was active in the 1580s. Hans Heinrich, a cousin of Hans Ulrich, died in 1610. Another Hans Heinrich (1597–1655) is recorded as reeve of Eglisau in 1652. One Johannes Stampfer (1610–1687) signed a Zwölfer in 1654. Another Johannes (1673–1692), son of one Hans Ulrich, is the last of the dynasty.
