= Francesca Calegari =

Italian physicist and academic

- Born: 11 January 1981 (age 45)
- Education: University of Milan; Polytechnic University of Milan
- Scientific career
- Workplaces: Polytechnic University of Milan; DESY; University of Hamburg
- Website: CFEL ATTO

Francesca Calegari (born 11 January 1981) is an Italian physicist who is lead of the Attosecond Science division at the Center for Free Electron Laser Science at DESY. She is a professor at the University of Hamburg. Calegari is interested in the electron dynamics of complex systems. She was awarded the International Commission of Optics (ICO) Prize and the Ernst Abbe Medal.

== Early life and education ==
Calegari studied physics at the University of Milan. She moved to the Polytechnic University of Milan for her doctoral research. She was a postdoctoral researcher at the Istituto Nazionale per la Fisica della Materia (INFM), where she spent a year before moving back to the Polytechnic University of Milan.

== Research and career ==
In 2011, Calegari was made a staff scientist in the Institute for Photonics and Nanotechnology. She held a joint position at the Polytechnic University of Milan. In 2016, she moved to DESY and was made professor at the University of Hamburg. She was made chair of the PIER (the partnership between Hamburg and DESY) Executive Board.

Calegari studies electron dynamics in complex systems, ranging from molecules to biomaterials and functional nanostructures. She has developed table top light sources for precise time dependent measurements across multiple different energy ranges. In particular she has developed attosecond approaches to understand the processes that occur in biomolecules (e.g. DNA).

== Awards and honours ==
- 2017: International Commission for Optics (ICO) Prize
- 2017: Ernst Abbe Medal
- 2018: Zdenek Herman Molec Young Scientist Prize
- 2020: Elected Fellow of the Optical Society

== Selected publications ==
- G. Sansone; E. Benedetti; Calegari, Francesca; et al. (2006). "Isolated single-cycle attosecond pulses". Science. 314 (5798): 443–446. Bibcode:2006Sci...314..443S. doi:10.1126/science.1132838. PMID 17053142. Wikidata Q62522074.
- Calegari, Francesca; D Ayuso; A Trabattoni; et al. (2014). "Ultrafast electron dynamics in phenylalanine initiated by attosecond pulses". Science. 346 (6207): 336–339. Bibcode:2014Sci...346..336C. doi:10.1126/science.1254061. PMID 25324385. Wikidata Q51023257.
- Calegari, Francesca; Giuseppe Sansone; Salvatore Stagira; Caterina Vozzi; Nisoli, Mauro (2016). "Advances in attosecond science". Journal of Physics B. 49 (6) 062001. Bibcode:2016JPhB...49f2001C. doi:10.1088/0953-4075/49/6/062001. Wikidata Q62521898.
