= Tamar Seideman =

Professor of Chemistry and Physics

- תמר זיידמן
- Born: November 26, 1959 (age 66); Israel
- Education: Tel Aviv University; Weizmann Institute of Science
- Known for: Nanoscience; Coherent control Strong field dynamics Theoretical chemistry
- Scientific career
- Workplaces: National Research Council of Canada; University of California, Berkeley; Northwestern University; Weizmann Institute of Science

Tamar Seideman (Hebrew: תמר זיידמן) is the Dow Chemical Company Professor of Chemistry and Professor of Physics at Northwestern University. She specialises in coherence spectroscopies and coherent control in isolated molecules and dissipative media as well as in ultrafast nanoplasmonics, current-driven phenomena in nanoelectronics and mathematical models.

== Early life and education ==
Seideman was born in Israel. She studied chemistry at the Tel Aviv University and graduated summa cum laude with a bachelor's degree in 1982. She joined the Weizmann Institute of Science for her doctoral studies and earned her PhD under the supervision of Moshe Shapiro in 1990. Her doctoral work considered the quantum theory of laser catalysis. Seideman was made a Weizmann Fellow and a Fulbright Program Fellow at University of California, Berkeley. Here she worked with William H. Miller on mathematical method development. In 1992 she joined the Ames Research Center as a Principal Investigator before being appointed a research associate at the National Research Council of Canada in 1993.

== Research and career ==
Seideman was made an associate research officer at the National Research Council of Canada in 1996. She was cross-appointed as a professor of chemistry at Queen's University. Here she developed the concepts of nonadiabatic alignment and molecular focusing in laser fields and the theory of time-resolved photoelectron angular distributions. She collaborated with experimentalist coworkers on the problem of the molecular phase in two-pathway excitation experiments and on current-triggered surface nanochemistry.

Seideman was made a professor of chemistry at Northwestern University in 2003. Here she develops and applies quantum mechanical theories to understand phenomena including quantum transport and current-induced dynamics in molecular electronic devices; ultrafast nanoplasmonics and information guidance in the nanoscale; attosecond science and the interaction of matter with intense laser fields; and coherent control and coherence spectroscopies in isolated molecules and in dissipative media. In other research, Seideman has explored coherent control of molecular dynamics and its extension to control of transport in the nanoscale. She proposed that current in nanoscale constructs can be used to drive molecular machines. Additionally, she has demonstrated it is possible to use a scanning tunnelling microscope to control surface reactions. In related work, Seideman showed that one can guide light using nanoparticle arrays to create custom nanoplasmonics.

Her recent work has developed theoretical and computational models to control the nanoscale properties of material systems. This has included an investigation of charge transport through molecular and nanoscale electronic materials in an effort to improve the efficiency of solar cells. To understand charge transport mechanisms, she has studied optically induced tunnelling through junctions. Her best known research is in the area of laser alignment. Originally introduced for isolated small molecules, this was recently extended to nonrigid molecules. dissipative media and condensed matter systems. In disordered assembly, the laser field can impart long-range orientational order to molecular layers. In dense molecular assemblies, alignment can become a collective phenomenon with long range translational and orientational order. In polyatomic molecules alignment can be used to control torsional motions with a variety of new applications, including control of charge transport, energy transfer, axial chirality and reactivity. Seideman takes annually a visiting professor position at the Weizmann Institute of Science.

=== Awards and honours ===
Her awards and honours include ("Tamar Seideman: Department of Physics and Astronomy - Northwestern University". www.physics.northwestern.edu.);

- Member of the German Academy of Sciences Leopoldina, Halle, Germany
- Fellow of the American Physical Society
- Fellow of the John Simon Guggenheim Memorial Foundation
- Senior A. von Humboldt Research Award, Berlin, Germany
- Sackler Visiting Award, Tel-Aviv, Israel
- University of Hamburg Mildred Dresselhaus Award, Hamburg, Germany
- Weizmann Institute of Science Weston Professorship, Rehovot, Israel
- Journal of Physical Chemistry Celebration of Women Chemists
- Wegner Award, Haifa, Israel
- Fulbright Research Award, University of California Berkeley
- Chaim Weizmann Fellowship, University of California Berkeley
- J. F. Kennedy Award, Rehovot, Israel
- Daniel Brener Award, Rehovot, Israel
- Knesset of Israel Award, Jerusalem, Israel

=== Selected publication ===
She is the author of 311 publications, including;

- Seideman, Tamar (2010). Current-Driven Phenomena in Nanoelectronics. Stanford. ISBN 978-9814241502.
- Seideman, Tamar (2003-04-17). "Colloquium: Aligning molecules with strong laser pulses". Reviews of Modern Physics. 75 (2): 543–557. Bibcode:2003RvMP...75..543S. doi:10.1103/RevModPhys.75.543. S2CID 4655968.
- Seideman, Tamar (1999-12-13). "Revival Structure of Aligned Rotational Wave Packets". Physical Review Letters. 83 (24): 4971–4974. Bibcode:1999PhRvL..83.4971S. doi:10.1103/PhysRevLett.83.4971.
