= Flag of Switzerland =

Swiss Confederation
- Use: National flag
- Proportion: 1:1
- Adopted: 1840; 186 years ago
- Design: A red square flag with a white Greek cross in the centre.
- Civil and state ensign of Switzerland
- Use: Civil and state ensign
- Proportion: 2:3
- Adopted: 1882; 144 years ago
- Design: A red flag with a white Greek cross in the centre and a proportion of 2:3.

The national flag of Switzerland (Note: German: Schweizerfahne; French: drapeau de la Suisse; Italian: bandiera svizzera; Romansh: bandiera da la Svizra; Latin: Vexillum Helvetiae) displays a white Greek cross in the centre of a red field. The white cross is known as the Swiss cross or the federal cross. Its arms are rectangular, with a ratio of height to width of 7:6 for the vertical arms and 6:7 for the horizontal arms. The size of the cross in relation to the field was set in 2017 as 5:8. The Swiss flag is square, instead of the rectangular shape typical for national flags. (Note: The only other square national flag is the flag of Vatican City.) (Note: The square shape is due to the shape of late medieval and early modern war flags carried by infantry regiments, while most other national flags, following the example of the British Union Flag and the Dutch Prince's Flag, hark back to the tradition of rectangular maritime flags used in the Age of Sail. The communes and cantons of Switzerland also have square flags.)

The white cross has been used as the field sign (attached to the clothing of combatants and to the cantonal war flags in the form of strips of linen) of the Old Swiss Confederacy since its formation in the late 13th or early 14th century. Its symbolism was described by the Swiss Federal Council in 1889 as representing "at the same the Christian cross symbol and the field sign of the Old Confederacy". As a national ensign, it was first used during the Napoleonic Wars by general Niklaus Franz von Bachmann, and as regimental flag of all cantonal troops from 1841. The federal coat of arms (eidgenössisches Wappen) was defined in 1815 for the Restored Confederacy as the white-on-red Swiss cross in a heraldic shield. The current design was used together with a cross composed of five squares until 1889, when its dimensions were officially set.

The civil and state ensign of Switzerland, used by Swiss ships, boats and non-governmental bodies, is rectangular in shape and has the more common proportions of 2:3, Swiss law also specifies 2:3 proportions for flags displayed on Swiss registered aircraft. The emblem of the Red Cross is the Swiss flag with switched colours.

== Design ==
Construction sheet.

According to the 2017 flag law (SR 232.21), "the Swiss flag shows a Swiss cross on a square background". Special provisions are made for the naval ensign and for civil aircraft identification. The Swiss cross is defined as

"a white, upright, free-standing cross depicted against a red background, whose arms, which are all of equal size, are one-sixth longer than they are wide."

Swiss Standard German consistently uses Fahne (cognate with vane) rather than the term Flagge used for national flags in Germany. The name of the flag of the Swiss Confederation is a nominal compound, Schweizerfahne.

The flag is emblazoned in English as, "Gules, a cross coupée argent."

=== Proportions ===
While the proportions of the cross have been fixed since 1889, the size of the cross relative to the flag (the width of the margin separating the cross couped from the edge of the flag) had not been officially fixed prior to 2017.

The annex to the flag law provides an image specifying that the margin is to be of the same width as the cross arms, so that the total height of the cross is fixed at 20:32 = 5:8 of the height of the flag (in other words, the width of the margin is 6:32 = 3:16). This ratio is also given as a "vexillological recommendation" in the flag regulation used by the Swiss Armed Forces. Flags with a cross of larger relative widths than the prescribed 20:32 = 62.5% remain in wide use; common ratios include 20:26 ≈ 76.9% and 20:28 ≈ 71.4%.

20:32 ratio

20:28 ratio

20:26 ratio

2:3 ratio (proportions of the 1841 military flags, no longer recommended)

3:5 ratio (regular division of the field into 25 squares, not recommended)

For the ensign, the ratio of the size of the cross to the height is likewise 5:8, so that the ratio of cross to flag width is 5:12.

=== Colors ===
The shade of red used in the flag was not defined by law prior to 2017. Since then, the colour of the flag is defined as pure red, with the colour values as follows:

Flag using Hexadecimal #FF0000, which correspond to the RGB and CMYK colours.

Flag using Hexadecimal #DA291C, which corresponds to Pantone 485C.

Variants of the swiss red on the flag and coat of arms

Colour scheme
CMYK	0–100–100–0
RGB	255–0–0
Hexadecimal	#FF0000
Pantone	485C or 485U
NCS	S 1085-Y90R
Scotchcal	100 -13
RAL	3020 (Traffic Red)

== History ==
=== Middle Ages ===
The ultimate origin of the white cross is attributed by three competing legends: to the Theban Legion, to the Reichssturmfahne (Imperial War Banner) attested from the 12th century, and to the Arma Christi that were especially venerated in the three forest cantons, and which they were allegedly allowed to display on the formerly uniformly red battle flag from 1289 by King Rudolph I of Habsburg at the occasion of a campaign to Besançon.

Use of a white cross as a mark of identification of the combined troops of the Old Swiss Confederacy is first attested in the Battle of Laupen (1339), where it was sewn on combatants' clothing as two stripes of textile, contrasting with the red Saint George's Cross of Habsburg Austria, and with the Saint Andrew's Cross used by Burgundy and Maximilian I. The first flag used as a field sign representing the confederacy rather than the individual cantons may have been used in the Battle of Arbedo in 1422 (notably without the participation of the Canton of Schwyz). This was a triangular red flag with an elongated white cross.

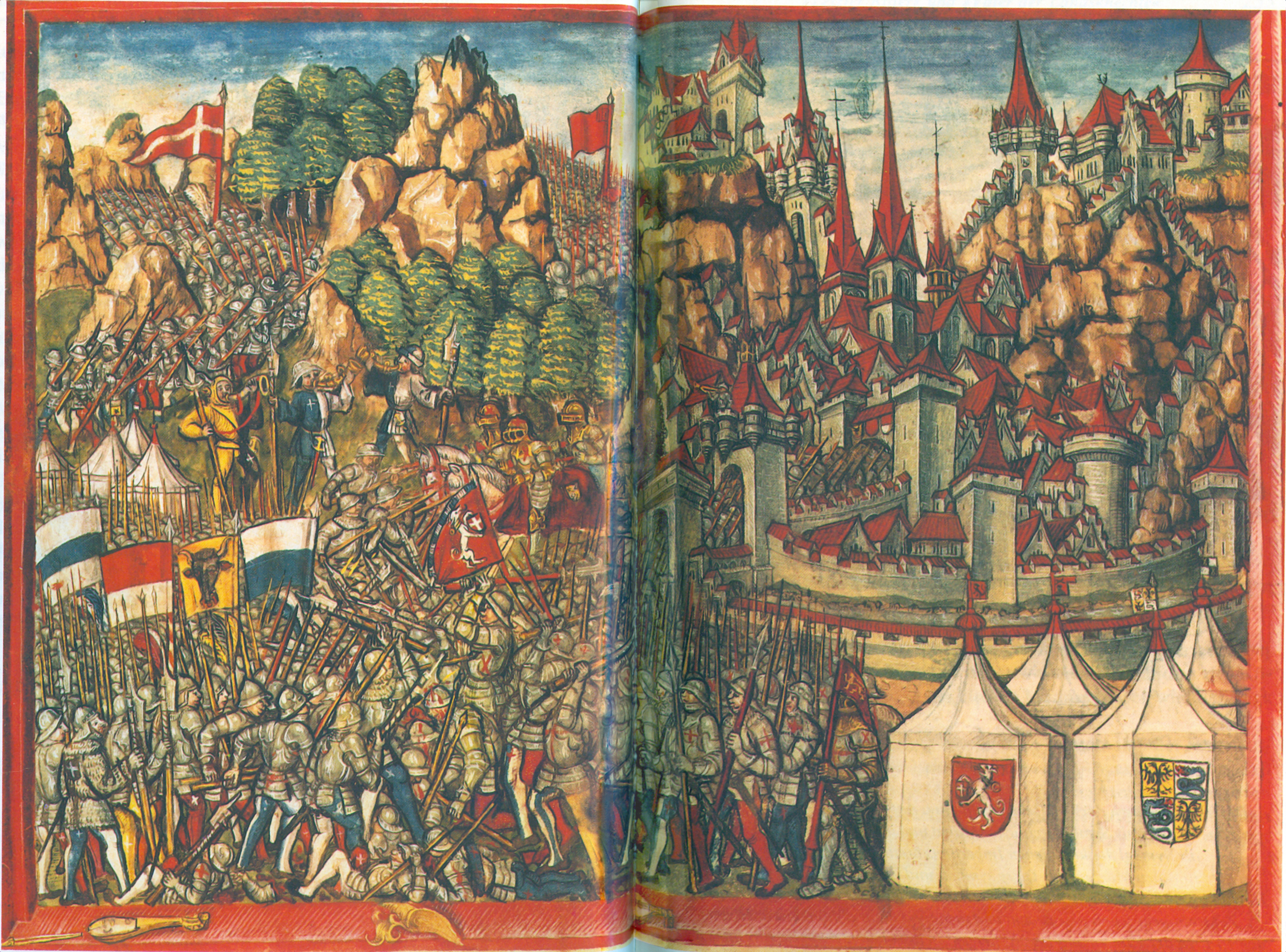
The Battle of Arbedo (1422) as depicted in the Lucerne chronicle (1513). The Swiss Confederates are shown as marching under their cantonal flags (Lucerne, Uri, Unterwalden, Zug), with the white cross attached to their garments. Reinforcements of Schwyz are shown arriving in the top left, with a red triangular flag showing the white cross.

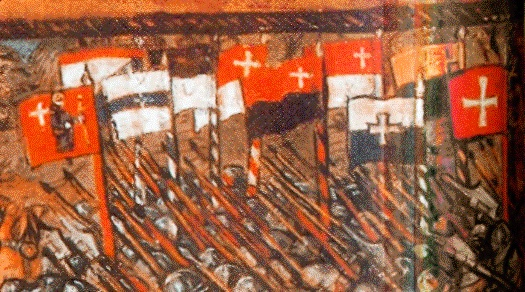
Ten cantonal war flags being carried in the Battle of Nancy (1477) in the depiction of the Luzerner Chronik of 1513. All flags of the Eight Cantons are shown, but the flags of Berne and Uri omit the heraldic animal, showing only the cantonal colours. In addition, the flags of Fribourg and Solothurn are shown, at the time not yet full members, who would join the confederacy in the aftermath of this battle. Each flag has the confederate cross attached.

The white cross was thus in origin a field mark attached to combatants for identification, and later also to cantonal flags. The Lucerne chronicle of 1513, in battle scenes of the Burgundy Wars of the 1470s shows cantonal flags with an added white cross. In this context, the solid-red war flag of Schwyz with the addition of the white cross appears much like the later flag of Switzerland. Other depictions in the illustrated chronicles show a flag of Schwyz with an asymmetrical white cross, drawn in greater detail. The symbol of the confederation as it developed during 1450-1520 was thus the white cross itself, not necessarily in a red field, but attached to existing flags, so that it appeared before a red background in those cantonal flags that contained red, notably the solid-red flag of Schwyz.

War flag of the Holy Roman Empire (Reichssturmfahne) during the 13th century

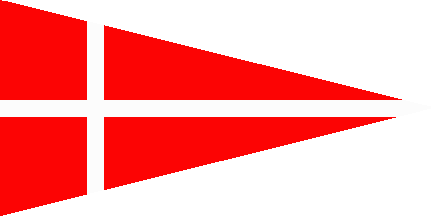
Triangular field ensign used by Swiss confederate forces from c. the 1420s

Field ensign used from c. 1470 and during the early 16th century

=== Early modern ===
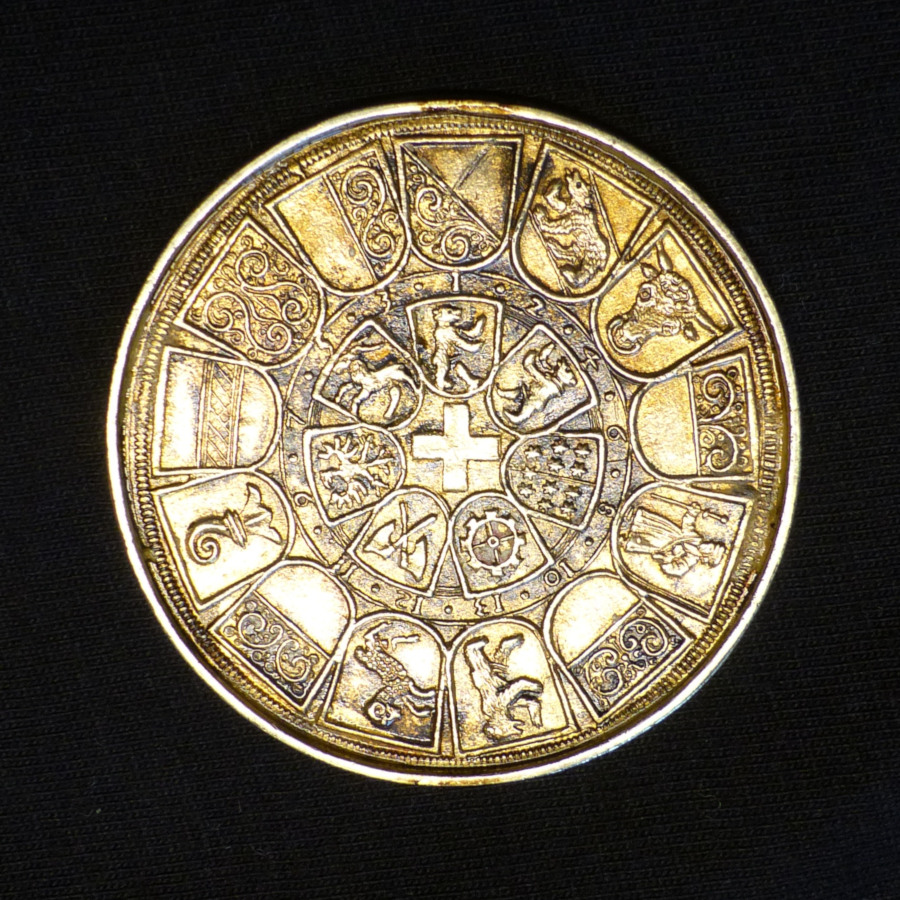
Jacob Stampfer's depiction of the Swiss cross at the center of a circular arrangement of the thirteen cantonal coats of arms (Bundestaler of 1546; his Patenpfennig of 1547 shows a larger and more elongated cross held by two angels).

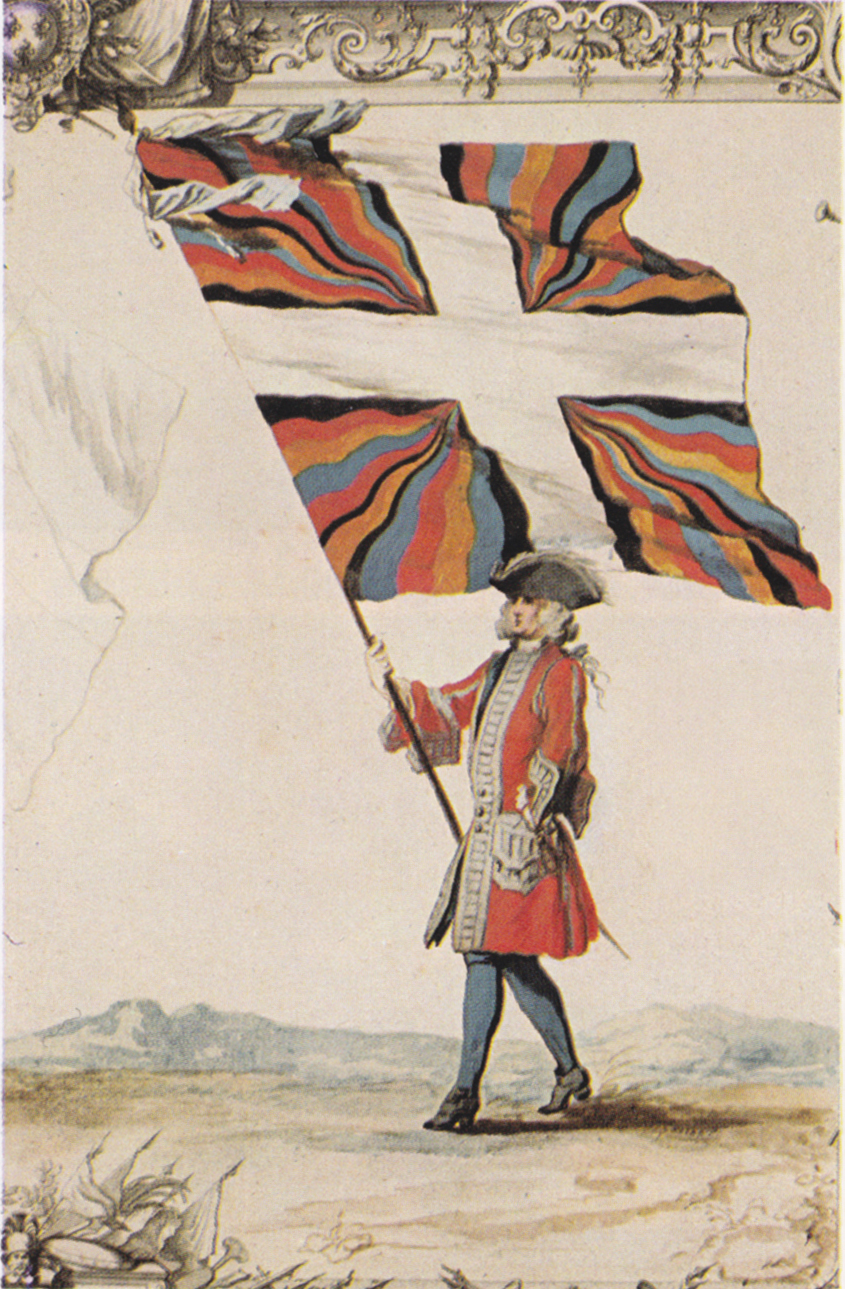
Depiction of a member of the Swiss Guard in France with a flammé flag, showing the French regimental white cross before a background of black, red, blue, and yellow flame designs

The first explicit mention of a separate flag representing the Confederacy dates to 1540, in the context of an auxiliary force sent by the Swiss to aid their associate, the city of Rottweil, in a feud against the lords of Landenberg. The Tagsatzung decided that the Swiss auxiliaries sent to Rottweil should receive "a red flag with a white upright cross". The first mention of the term Confederate Cross (Eidgenossen Crütz) dates to 1533.

Because of the Swiss pledge of neutrality, there was no military conflict in which the Swiss confederate troops participated after 1540. Consequently, the confederate field sign fell out of use. At the same time, the former field sign develops into a representation of the Confederacy during this time, without achieving the full status as official heraldic emblem. The cross is shown as a symbol of the Swiss Confederacy on the Patenmedallie cast by Jacob Stampfer and given by the Confederacy as a baptismal gift to Princess Claude of France in 1547. The cross appears on similar medals and on throughout the early modern period, but most symbolic depictions of the Confederacy in the 17th century do without the federal cross.

Beginning in the later 16th century, forces of the individual cantons adopted a type of flag which was based on a white cross design. These flags usually showed a white cross drawn to the edge of the field in front of a background striped in the respective cantonal colours. From this type, the flammé military flag develops in the 17th century, which also came to be used by Swiss mercenary regiments by the end of the 17th century. The flammé design remained popular for military flags of the 18th and 19th centuries. A flammé flag was introduced as ordonnance for the Bernese troops in 1703.

=== Napoleonic period and Restored Confederacy ===
The green-red-yellow banner of the Helvetic Republic, a French satellite state (1798–1803).

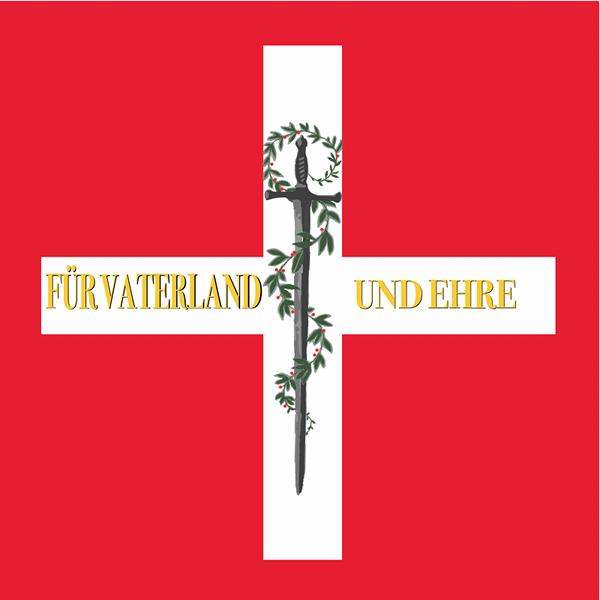
The first Swiss battalion flag, issued by the Tagsatzung on 12 October 1815, after the design of general Niklaus Franz von Bachmann. A red square field with a white cross in the centre containing a sword surrounded by laurels in its vertical. In the horizontal of the cross also written German words "Für Vaterland und Ehre" which means "For Fatherland and Honour".

After the French invasion of Swiss territory in 1798 and the subsequent collapse of the Confederation, the authorities of the newly proclaimed Helvetic Republic confiscated all earlier flags, replacing them with a green-red-yellow tricolour. General Niklaus Franz von Bachmann used the white cross in a red field his campaigns of 1800 and 1815. The term Schweizer-Fahne (later spelling Schweizerfahne) is in use for the flag from this time, recorded in a poem on the Battle of Näfels by one J. Hottinger published in 1808.

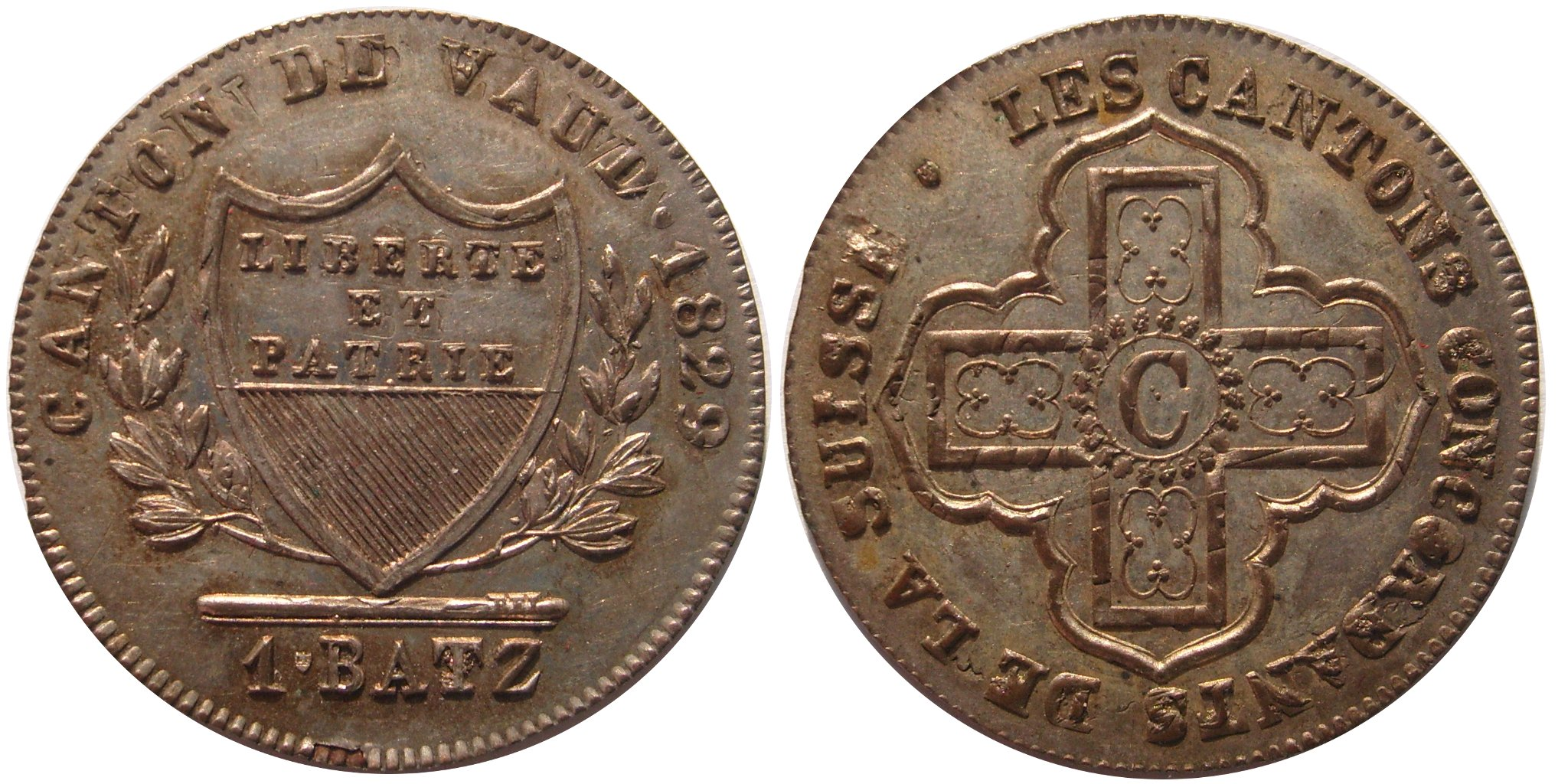
Swiss cross on a Konkordatsbatzen (1829)

The Tagsatzung (Swiss Diet) re-introduced the white cross in the red field for the seal of the Confederacy in 1814. The commission for drafting a federal constitution on 16 May 1814 recommended the adoption of a seal of the Confederacy based on the "field sign of the old Swiss". On 4 July 1815, the Diet accepted the design of the commission, adopted as the provisional seal described as "in the center, the federal red shield with the white cross as common federal heraldic emblem, surrounded by a simple circular Gothic ornament, on the outside of which the inscription 'Schweizerische Eidgenossenschaft' with the year number MDCCCXV, and in an outer circle all XXII cantonal coat of arms in circular fields, according to their federal order of precedence; around all, a simple wreath".

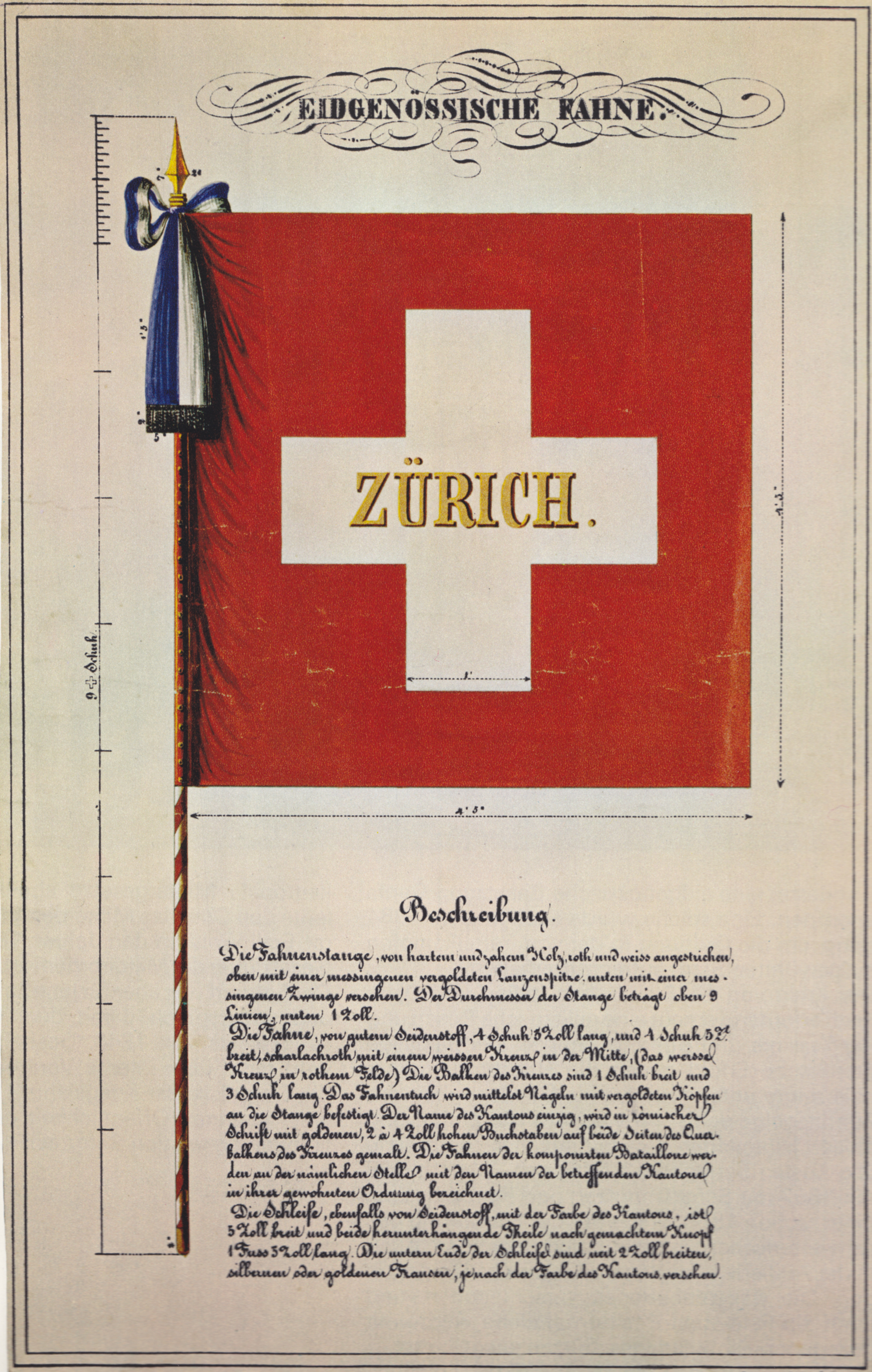
Final design for the flag used by cantonal troops under federal command (deployed by the Tagsatzung) in the Restoration period, by Carl Stauffer (1841)

This decision remained in force after the formation of the federal state in 1848, as was recognized by the Federal Council in 1889. As opposed to the definition of an official seal or coat of arms, it was not, at the time, usual to specify a "national flag". However, the white cross in a red field had seen frequent use on flags flown by private organizations during the Regeneration period (1830s), especially shooting, singing and gymnastics associations which at the time were a pool for progressive or "radical" agitation. The canton of Aargau introduced the flag for its troops in 1833. General Guillaume-Henri Dufour proposed use of the flag for all federal forces in 1839. The Tagsatzung on 2 September 1839 passed a resolution prescribing the use of a unified flag design for all cantonal infantry regiments. In a first circular sent to the cantonal authorities, the flag was described as a red flag with a cross touching the edges, but in 1841, the Tagsatzung opted for a proposal by Carl Stauffer, which was announced to the cantons on 11 October 1841. The 1841 flag shows a bold cross suspended in the center of the square field. The proportions of the cross arm are 1:1, i.e. the cross is composed of five squares. The absolute width of the flag is given as 4.5 feet (105 cm), that of the cross as 3 feet (90 cm), for a ratio of cross to flag width of 2:3 ≈ 66.7% (as opposed to the modern 5:8 = 62.5%).

The specifications include the flag pole and the ribbon with the cantonal colours attached to the pole (the example depicted is the flag of the Zürich battalion). The flag itself is described as of good silk cloth, four feet five inches squared, scarlet, in the center a white cross, arms measuring one foot by three feet.

=== Modern Switzerland ===
The Swiss constitution of 1848 did not name a national flag, but it prescribes the federal flag for all federal troops. The last flammé flags still used by Landwehr units were replaced by the modern design in 1865. In November 1889, the Federal Council published a "communication regarding the federal coat of arms", detailing the history of the use of the Swiss cross since the 15th century.

Seals produced from 1815 onward, and cantonal coins minted from 1826 showed the arms of the cross in the 7:6 length to width ratio. Later in the 19th century, there was a trend of depicting the cross as composed of five equal squares. The two competing designs were controversially discussed in the late 19th century, especially after the introduction of the new design for the five franks coin, which showed the Swiss coat of arms in a Baroque-style heraldic shield. The Federal Council in 1889 introduced the 7:6 ratio as official. The associated communication explains that "our heraldic cross is not a mathematical figure, but at the same the Christian cross symbol and the field sign of the Old Confederacy". The 1889 law explicitly avoids specification of the shape of the shield, which was to be left to the "tastes of the current time and practical necessity". The proposed legislation defining the Swiss federal coat of arms was passed on 12 December 1889 (SR 111). The rectangular variant of the flag is used as a naval ensign only, officially introduced with a federal law passed 23 September 1953.

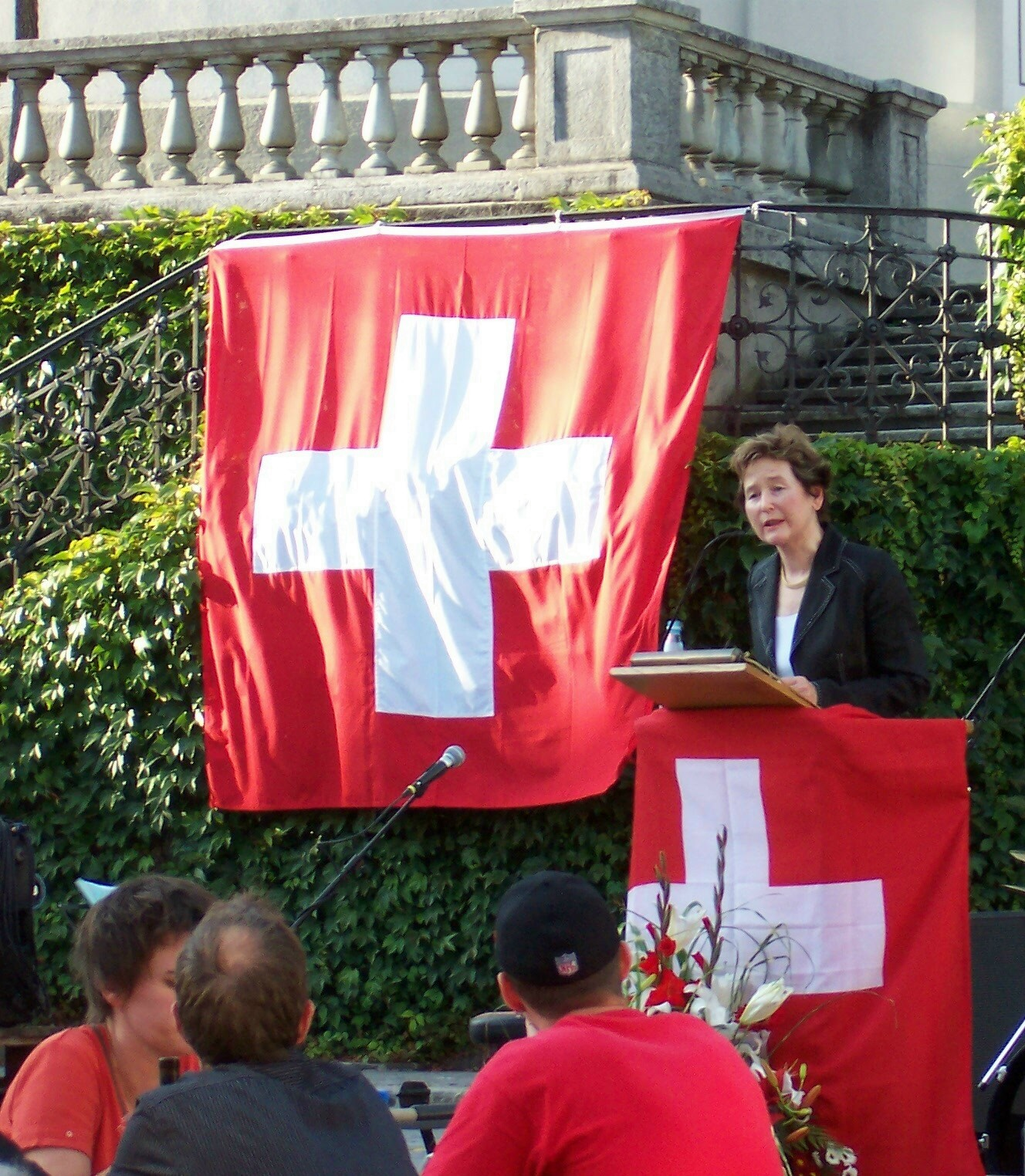
Former Federal Councillor Elisabeth Kopp speaking on 1 August 2007. The federal flag displayed here has a narrower margin than recommended in the flag regulation, with a ratio of cross to flag width of about 5:7 instead of the recommended 5:8.

The current flag law of the Swiss Confederacy is the Wappenschutzgesetz (WSchG, SR 232.21) of 2013 (in force since 2017). This law replaced the flag law of 1931 (last revised in 2008). The 2013 law for the first time defines both the Swiss flag and the Swiss coat of arms based on an image, declared as authoritative in the text.

== Use in Switzerland ==
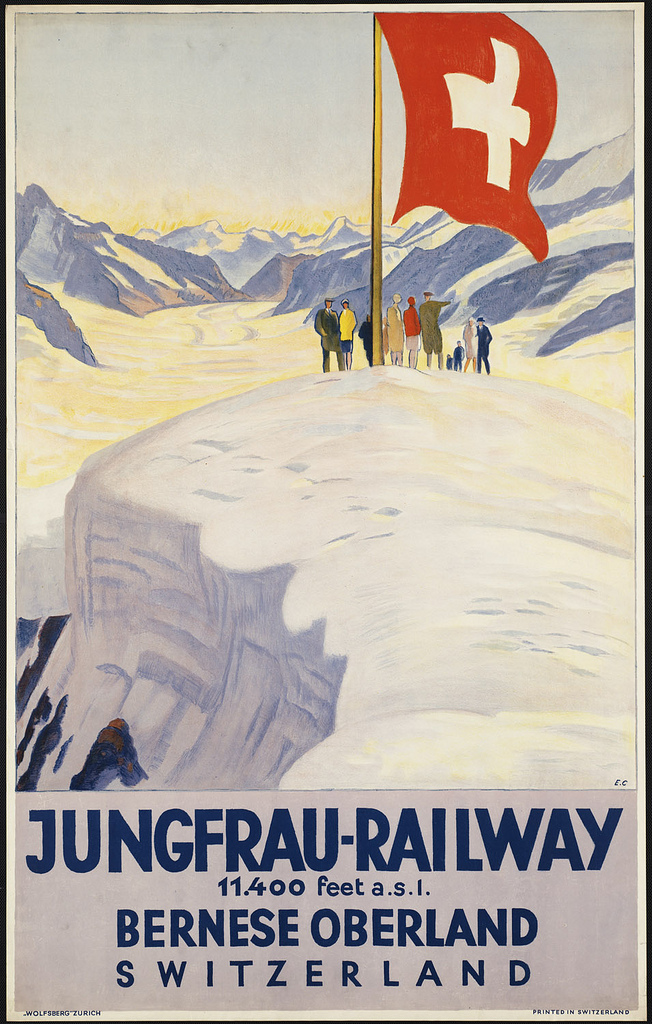
Depiction of the Swiss flag in a poster advertising the Jungfrau Railway (art by Emil Cardinaux, c. 1930)

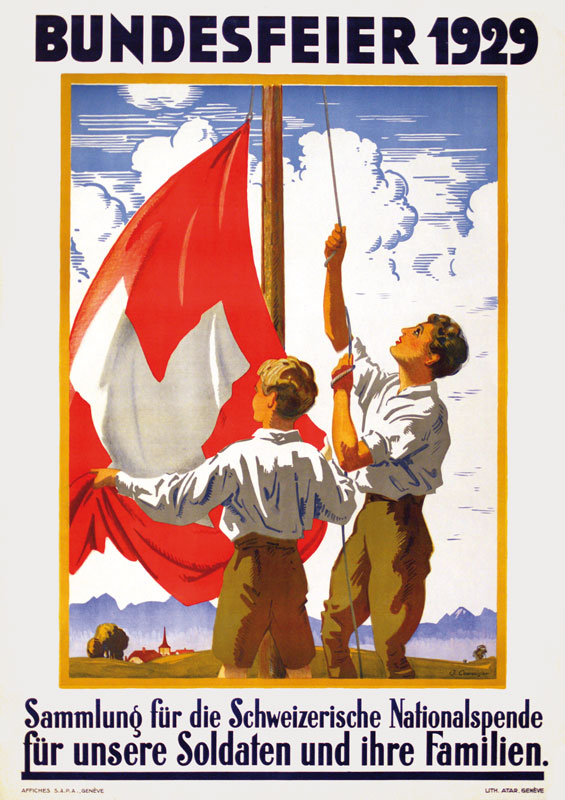
Schweizerische Nationalspende poster showing two boys raising the federal flag (Jules Courvoisier, 1929)

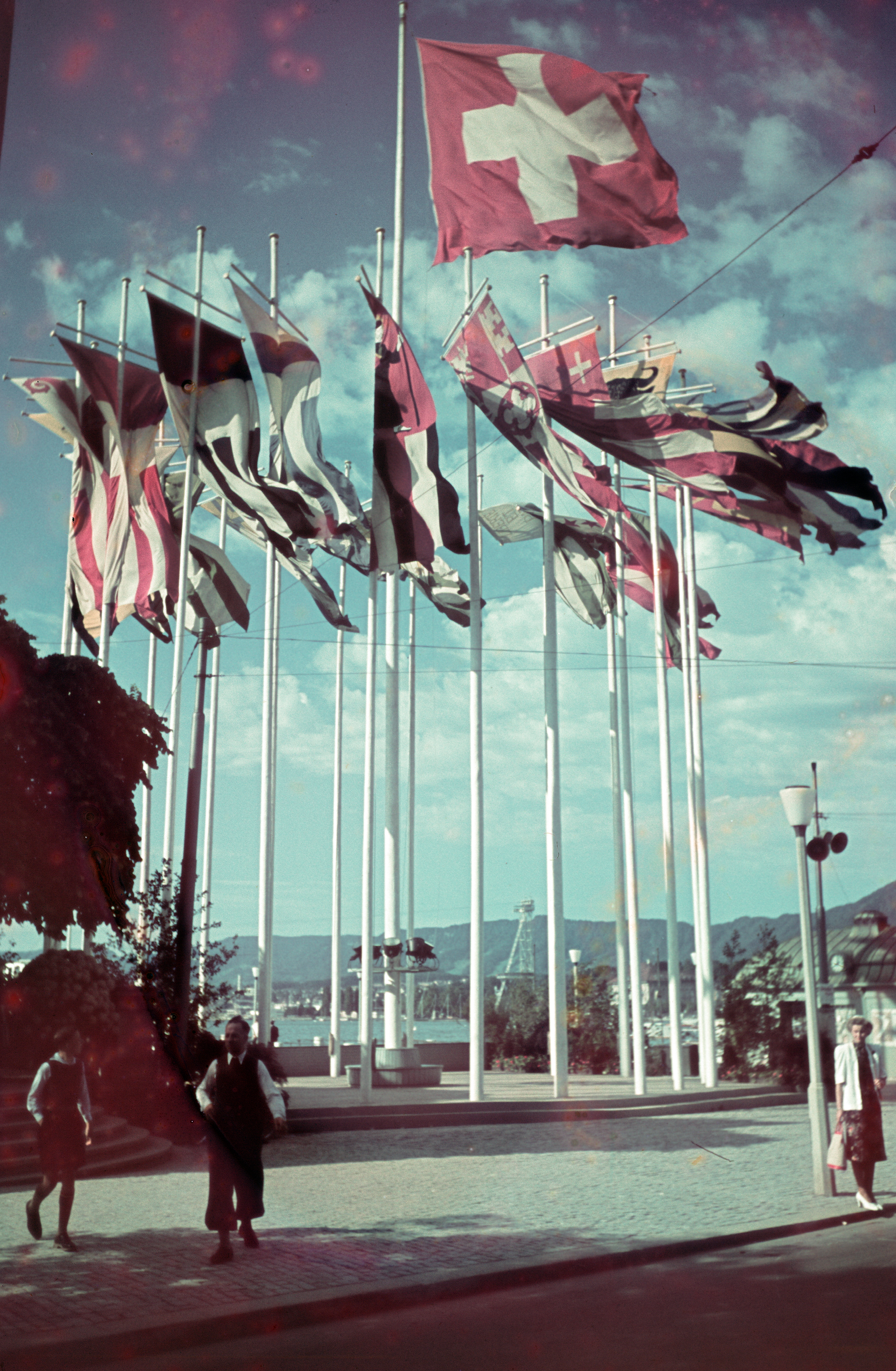
Swiss flag during the Swiss national exposition, „Landi”, Bürkliplatz in Zürich, 1939.

=== Private use ===
The flag is flown around the year from private and commercial buildings as a display of patriotism, particularly in rural areas and often together with the cantonal and municipal flag. On Swiss National Day, 1 August, the streets and buildings are traditionally festooned in celebration with Swiss flags and banners.

Prominent display of the Swiss flag on clothing and apparel has become more frequent with the "Swissness" fashion trend in the first decade of the 21st century, while such use of the flag had previously been largely limited to conservative and right-wing circles. The flag and coat of arms are also often used (frequently in contravention of federal law, see below) as design elements on merchandise, particularly on high-quality goods or on merchandise aimed at tourists; for example, the emblem of Victorinox, manufacturer of Swiss Army knives and the sole purveyor of these knives to the Swiss army, is based on the Swiss coat of arms.

=== Official use ===
The display of the flag on federal, cantonal and municipal public buildings follows no uniform pattern or regulation. Many public buildings are equipped with flag posts (most often one each for the federal, cantonal and municipal flag), but the flag(s) may only be flown during part of the year or only on National Day. In Bern, the flag is flown on the cupola of the Federal Palace while the Federal Assembly is in session.

=== Legal protection ===
Destruction, removal or desecration of a Swiss, cantonal or municipal flag or coat of arms that has been installed by a public authority is punishable by a monetary penalty or imprisonment of up to three years according to the federal penal code.

The commercial use of the Swiss cross, Swiss flag or Swiss coat of arms was technically prohibited by the 1931 Federal Act for the protection of public coats of arms and other public insignia, but that prohibition was not enforced. Increasing commercial use of the Swiss coat of arms prompted a number of federal regulations, dubbed "Swissness regulation" (Swissness-Verordnung), in force since 2017. The "Coat of Arms Protection Act" of 2017 (Wappenschutzgesetz, Loi sur la protection des armoiries, SR 232.21) now prohibits the commercial use of the Swiss coat of arms (defined as "a Swiss cross in a triangular shield"). Use of the Swiss flag is generally permitted with the provision that such use "is neither misleading nor contrary to public policy, morality or applicable law". Provisions are made for a "right to continued use" for trademarks registered before 2010.

== Influence ==
Flag of the Red Cross

The Red Cross symbol used by the International Committee of the Red Cross, a red cross on white background, was the original protection symbol declared at the first Geneva Convention, the Convention for the Amelioration of the Condition of the Wounded in Armies in the Field of 1864. According to the International Committee of the Red Cross the design was based on the Swiss flag by reversing of the colours of that flag, in order to honour Switzerland, where the first Geneva Convention was held, and its inventor and co-founder, the Swiss Henry Dunant.

The modern banner of the Pontifical Swiss Guard was designed in 1912–14 by commander Jules Repond. The design has a Swiss cross design based on the 18th-century regimental flags of the Swiss Guards, with the papal coat of arms of the reigning pope in the upper hoist and the Della Rovere coat of arms of Julius II in the lower fly, and a vignette with the commander's coat of arms in the centre.

== See also ==
- Coat of arms of Switzerland
- Flags and arms of cantons of Switzerland
- Flags and arms of municipalities of Switzerland
- Flag of the Red Cross
- Flag of Tonga
- Duchy of Saint Sava, a polity in present-day Bosnia and Herzegovina with a similar flag

== Bibliography ==
- Theodor von Liebenau, Das Schweizerkreuz, Schweizer Archiv für Heraldik 14.4 (1900), 121–128.
- Swiss Army (2008). Reglement 51.340 d: Der Umgang mit Fahnen, Standarten und Fanions (Fahnenreglement) (in German and French).
- "Swiss cross" in German, French and Italian in the online Historical Dictionary of Switzerland.
- "Flags" in German, French and Italian in the online Historical Dictionary of Switzerland.
- Wappen, Siegel und Verfassung der Schweizerischen Eidgenossenschaft und der Kantone", Schweizerischee Bundeskanzlei, Bern, 1948.
- Louis Mühlemann, "Wappen und Fahnen der Schweiz", Bühler-Verlag AG, Lengnau (1991)
- Peter M. Mäder, Günter Mattern, "Fahnen und ihre Symbole", Schweizerisches Landesmuseum, Bildband 4, Zürich, 1993. ISBN 3-908025-24-9.
- "Schweizer Wappen und Fahnen", 5 vols. Stiftung Schweizer Wappen und Fahnen, Zug/Luzern, 1987ff.
