= Ruth Signorell =

Swiss physical chemist

- Born: 1969 (age 56–57); Switzerland
- Awards: ERC Advanced Grant, Humboldt Prize, Werner Prize

Academic work
- Institutions: University of British Columbia, University of British Columbia, ETH Zurich, University of Göttingen

Ruth Signorell is a Swiss academic who works on fundamental aerosol science. In 2018 Signorell was awarded the Mildred Dresselhaus award, and in 2022 she was awarded the Doron Prize. She is a member of the European Academy of Science.

== Academic career ==
Signorell studied mathematics at the University of Zurich and chemistry and physics at ETH Zurich. In 2012, Signorell was appointed as a full professor of physical chemistry within the Department of Chemistry and Applied Biosciences at ETH Zurich.

Signorell’s research focuses on fundamental aerosol science. She and her research group study the formation, physicochemical nature, structure and reactive processes of aerosols. In particular, Signorell is interested in new techniques for aerosol detection and in the behavior of nanoaerosols. She has led the development of models of the rate of chemical reactions in atmospheric droplets, and has studied the nucleation processes involved in the first microseconds of aerosol formation. Her work is relevant to environment processes in the atmosphere, as well as the behavior of aerosol particles in infectious diseases.

Signorell is a member of the European Academy of Science.

== Awards ==
In 2018 Signorell was awarded the Mildred Dresselhaus Prize by the IEEE for “advancing the fundamental understanding of physical and chemical properties of aerosols and nanoparticles ubiquitous in our world”. In 2020 she was made a member of the European Academy of Science, and was awarded a Humboldt Research Award “for her outstanding achievements in research and teaching”. In 2022, she was awarded the Doron Prize.
