= BWI Center for Industrial Management =

Swiss research institute

The BWI Center for Industrial Management at the ETH Zürich (formerly Institute of Industrial Engineering and Management of the ETH) conducts enterprise research as well as education and services for the ETH and commercial enterprises.

== History ==
The private-sector Association for the Promotion of the ETH Institute of Industrial Engineering and Management (BWI) was founded on 26 June 1929. The BWI was inaugurated the same year on 1 October 1929, together with a specialized library.

Currently, 650 companies and individual customers draw services of the BWI every year. The subscribers of the journal io new management are not included in that number.

== Research ==
The research of the BWI in the areas logistics, operations management and supply chain management, global service management and service innovation addresses enterprises that concentrate on technology and deals with questions and challenges concerning their value added. The goal of the applied science at the BWI is to obtain generalizable recommendations for action for the decision-making of an enterprise on the basis of practice-oriented problems.

== Management further education ==
BWI Management Further Education organizes seminars and workshops since 1931. About 150 seminars with 400 seminar days are held every year. The publicly announced seminars cover 45 titles and originate from the four subject areas project management, leadership, supply chain management and management techniques. The company-internal seminars are "in-house"-organized standard seminars for enterprises from the areas engineering industry, information and communication industry, medical engineering, banks and insurance companies, chemical and pharmaceutical industry as well as public administration.

== Journal ==
The BWI is editor of the management journal io new management. The journal was launched in 1932 as Industrial Organization (io). It appears 10 times a year and is now published by Axel Springer Schweiz. The circulation figure in 2008 was, according to WEMF, 4428.

== Erfa-group ==
The know-how group on "Production and Information Management" (Erfa-group PIM) is a working group of participants from industry and the university. It deals with the topics production, logistics and information management. Goal of the Erfa-group PIM is to inform its members about trends and to promote the exchange of experiences.

== Sources ==
- Annual Report 2009 / BWI Center for Industrial Management. Logistics, Operations, and Supply Chain Management
- IO new management: Zeitschrift für Unternehmenswissenschaften und Führungspraxis / hrsg. vom Zentrum für Unternehmenswissenschaften der ETH Zürich und der Verlagsgruppe HandelsZeitung. Jg. 70 (2001)-

47°22′35.10″N 8°32′53.17″E
