= Bailiwick of Ruswil =

Former bailiwick of Lucerne, Switzerland

Bailiwick of Ruswil Landvogtei Ruswil
- Bailiwick of Lucerne
- c. 1396–1798
- Capital: Ruswil
- History
  - Established: c. 1396
  - Disestablished: 1798

The Bailiwick of Ruswil (German: Landvogtei Ruswil) was an office (Amt) of the lordship of Wolhusen and later, until 1798, a bailiwick of Lucerne, with its administrative center in the village of Ruswil. It was formed around 1396, when the lordship of Wolhusen, which Lucerne had taken over in 1386, was divided into the offices of Ruswil and Entlebuch. The Onion War of 1513 started in Ruswil. During the Helvetic Republic Ruswil was a district, and from 1814 to 1912 the old office survived as a court district.

== History ==
The area belonged to the inner and outer castles of Wolhusen, which lay in the parish of Ruswil. The holders of the inner castle claimed high jurisdiction. During the Sempach War of 1386, Lucerne took over the lordship of Wolhusen. From about 1392 it was headed by a bailiff (Vogt) from Lucerne's Small Council, and around 1396 it was divided into the offices (Ämter) of Ruswil and Entlebuch. A bailiff of Ruswil is also mentioned in 1392.

The office of Ruswil comprised the parishes (Kirchgänge) of Buttisholz, Grosswangen, Menznau and Geiss (in the municipality of Menznau) and most of the parish of Ruswil, but no longer Grossdietwil. The village of Ruswil became the new administrative center, and the regional court (Landgericht) sat at Buholz, in the municipality of Ruswil. Around 1400, invoking the old blood-court districts of Wolhusen and with Lucerne's help, Ruswil expanded into Austrian territories as far as the outskirts of Sursee and into the Eiamt in the Michelsamt. The boundary with the Eiamt was marked out in 1443, and in 1424 and 1459 Ruswil expanded at the expense of the county of Willisau. The Rothenburg exclaves of Sigigen and Honig within the office, which dated from the time of the barons of Rothenburg, existed until the Helvetic Republic and were incorporated into the municipality of Ruswil in the 19th century.

The office was represented by nine jurors (Geschworene). In 1513 the Onion War (Zwiebelnkrieg) started in Ruswil; in it the people of the office resisted the restriction of their political participation and the authorities' policy on mercenary service and pensions. Court records (Gerichtsbücher) are attested from 1627.

During the Helvetic Republic, Ruswil was a district, without Grosswangen and the Nottwil farms but enlarged by Schachen (now in the municipality of Werthenstein) and the office of Malters. In 1814 the old office of Ruswil was revived, with a changed northern boundary, as a court district (Gerichtsbezirk) of the Amt of Sursee (without Menznau from 1831). In 1912 the court district of Ruswil was merged into the district court of Sursee.

== Bibliography ==
- F. Glauser, J. J. Siegrist, Die Luzerner Pfarreien und Landvogteien, 1977, especially 52–65
- Ruswil, 1987
