= Flags and arms of cantons of Switzerland =

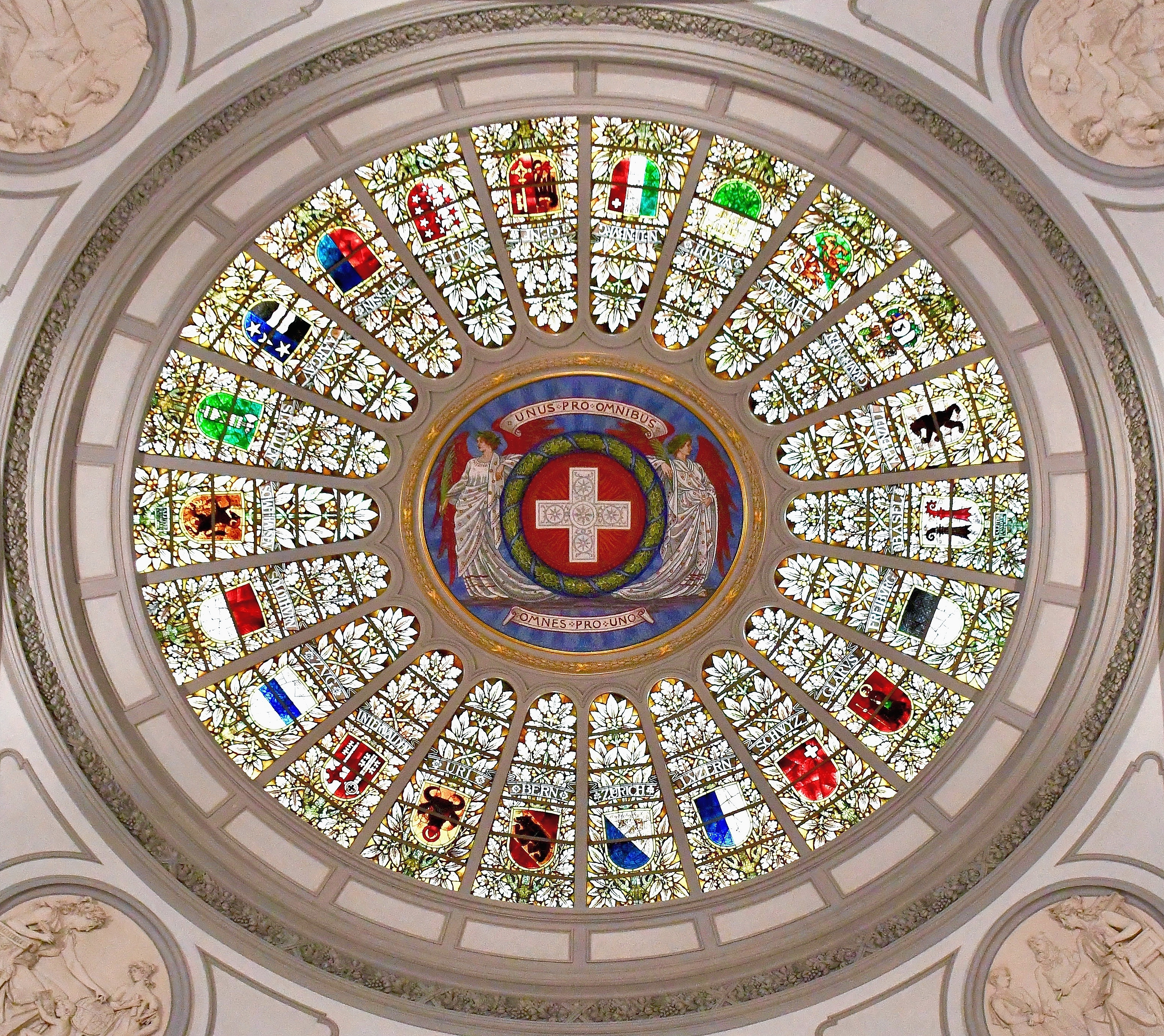
The 22 cantonal coats of arms in the stained glass dome of the Federal Palace of Switzerland (c. 1900)

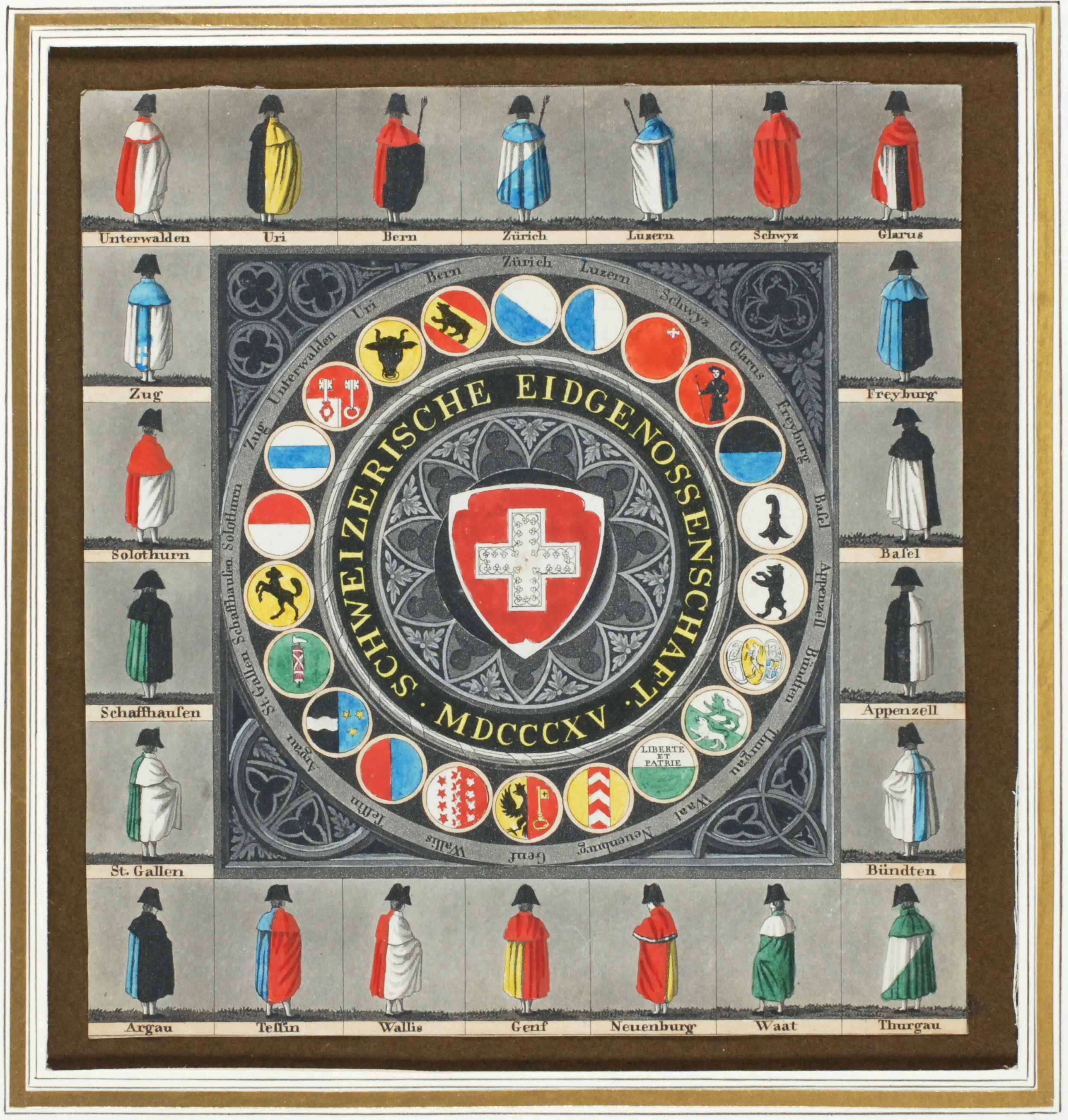
Great Seal of the Confederacy, with the Standesfarben to be worn by the cantonal huissiers (Standesweibel), print published in c. 1830.

Each of the 26 modern cantons of Switzerland has an official flag and a coat of arms. The history of development of these designs spans the 13th to the 20th centuries.

== List ==
The cantons are listed in their order of precedence given in the federal constitution. This reflects the historical order of precedence of the Eight Cantons in the 15th century, followed by the remaining cantons in the order of their historical accession to the confederacy.

Standesfarben were used to identify the (historical) cantons when the full banner was not available for display, although there is overlap; Unterwalden and Solothurn share the same colours, as do Basel and Appenzell, and with the accession of the modern cantons, Valais and Basel-City, and St. Gallen and Thurgau.

Nr.	Name	COA	Flag	Colours	Blazon	Date	Capital
1	Zurich	Coat of arms of Zürich			Per bend argent and azure	13th c.	Zürich
2	Bern	Coat of arms of Bern			Gules, on a bend or a bear passant sable armed, langued, and pizzled of the field	13th c.	Bern
3	Lucerne	Coat of arms of Luzern			Per pale azure and argent (flag: Per fess argent and azure)	14th c.	Lucerne
4	Uri	Coat of arms of Uri			Or, a bull's head cabossed sable langued and nose-ringed gules	13th c.	Altdorf
5	Schwyz	Coat of arms of Schwyz			Gules, in sinister chief a cross couped argent (flag: Gules, in dexter chief a cross couped argent)	13th c.; 17th c. (modern coa)	Schwyz
6a	Obwalden	Coat of arms of Obwalden			Per fess gules and argent, a key paleways counterchanged	13th c. (as part of Unterwalden); 17th c. (modern coa)	Sarnen
6b	Nidwalden	Coat of arms of Nidwalden			Gules, a key paleways with two shafts argent	13th c. (as part of Unterwalden); 17th c. (modern coa)	Stans
7	Glarus	Coat of arms of Glarus			Gules, a pilgrim walking towards the dexter argent, habited sable, holding in his dexter hand a staff, in his sinister hand a bible, and about his head a halo, all or	14th c.	Glarus
8	Zug	Coat of arms of Zug			Argent, a fess azure	1319	Zug
9	Fribourg	Coat of arms of Fribourg			Per fess sable and argent	1470s (banner); 1830 (coa)	Fribourg
10	Solothurn	Coat of arms of Solothurn			Per fess gules and argent	1443	Solothurn
11a	Basel-Stadt	Coat of arms of Basel-City			Argent, a crosier paleways sable	13th c.	Basel
11b	Basel-Landschaft	Coat of arms of Basel-Country			Argent, a crosier with seven crockets paleways to sinister gules	1834	Liestal
12	Schaffhausen	Coat of arms of Schaffhausen			Or, a ram salient sable horned, crowned, unguled, and pizzled of the field, and langued gules	1218	Schaffhausen
13a	Appenzell Innerrhoden	Coat of arms of Appenzell Innerrhoden			Argent, a bear rampant sable armed, langued, and pizzled gules	15th c. (as Appenzell)	Appenzell
13b	Appenzell Ausserrhoden	Coat of arms of Appenzell Ausserrhoden			Argent, a bear rampant sable armed, langued, and pizzled gules, between the letters V and R sable	15th c. (as Appenzell); 17th c. (modern coa)	Herisau; Trogen
14	St. Gallen	Coat of arms of St. Gallen			Vert, a fasces paleways argent banded of the field	1803	St. Gallen
15	Grisons	Coat of arms of Graubünden			Per fess and in chief per pale: first per pale sable and argent; second quarterly azure and or, a cross counterchanged; third argent, an ibex rampant sable langued and pizzled gules	15th c. (Three Leagues); 1933 (modern coa)	Chur
16	Aargau	Coat of arms of Aargau			Per pale, the first sable, three bars wavy argent; the second azure, three stars argent	1803	Aarau
17	Thurgau	Coat of arms of Thurgau			Per bend argent and vert, two lions passant bendways or langued and pizzled gules	1803	Frauenfeld
18	Ticino	Coat of arms of Ticino			Per pale gules and azure (flag: Per fess gules and azure)	1803	Bellinzona
19	Vaud	Coat of arms of Vaud			Per fess argent and vert, in chief the words 'Liberté et Patrie' or	1803	Lausanne
20	Valais	Coat of arms of Valais			Per pale argent and gules, thirteen stars counterchanged	1571; 1815 (modern coa)	Sion
21	Neuchâtel	Coat of arms of Neuchâtel			Per pale vert and gules, a pale and in sinister chief a cross couped, both argent	1857	Neuchâtel
22	Geneva	Coat of arms of Geneva			Per pale: first or, an eagle with two heads dimidiated per pale sable crowned, armed, and beaked gules; second gules, a key paleways or	15th c.	Geneva
23	Jura	Coat of arms of Jura			Per pale: first argent, a crosier gules; second gules, three bars argent	1979	Delémont
	Swiss Confederation	Federal coat of arms of Switzerland	Federal flag of Switzerland		Gules, a Cross couped Argent	14th c. (Swiss cross); 1815 (modern coa)	(Bern)

== Heraldic charges ==
Of the 26 cantons since 1999 (22 cantons in 1848, accession of Jura in 1979, three half-cantons designated "canton" in 1999):

- six flags are simple bicolor designs, per fess (Lucerne, Fribourg, Solothurn, Ticino), per bend (Zürich) or with a central fess (Zug). The coats of arms of Ticino and Lucerne have the peculiarity that they are per pale even though the flags are per fess.
- eight flags with heraldic animals:
  - the bear for Bern and for Appenzell (both Innerrhoden and Ausserrhoden)
  - the bull for Uri
  - the ram for Schaffhausen
  - the ibex for Graubünden (at the time only one of three coats of arms shown side by side for the Three Leagues)
  - the eagle (Reichsadler) for Geneva
  - two lions for Thurgau
- three with the bishop's crozier or Baselstab, for Basel (Basel-City and Basel-Country) and Jura
- three with a key (Keys of Heaven), for Unterwalden (both Obwalden and Nidwalden) and for Geneva
- two cantons show the Swiss cross, for Schwyz on solid red, and for Neuchâtel in the corner of the "revolutionary" tricolour
- two with stars, Valais and Aargau, the latter with additional wavy lines representing rivers
- two with letters for Appenzell Ausserrhoden (VR for Ussere Rhoden) and Vaud (inscription 'Liberté et Patrie').
- the image of a pilgrim (Saint Fridolin) for Glarus
- the fasces for St. Gallen

Distinctively, Swiss cantons use square flags.

== History ==
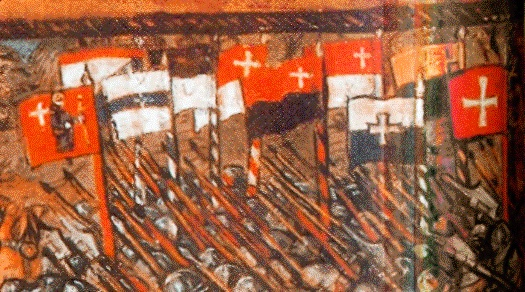
Ten cantonal war flags carried in the Battle of Nancy (1477) in the depiction of the Luzerner Chronik of 1513. All flags of the Eight Cantons are shown, but the flags of Bern and Uri omit the heraldic animal, showing only the cantonal colours. In addition, the flags of Fribourg and Solothurn appear - at the time not yet full members, these areas would join the confederacy in the aftermath of this battle. Each flag has the confederate cross attached.

Historically, the number of cantons was:

- eight from 1352 to 1481, see Eight Cantons
- thirteen from 1513 to 1798, see Thirteen Cantons
- twenty during the time of the Helvetic Republic, from 1798 to 1803, without official flags or coats of arms
- twenty-two from 1848 to 1978, including three cantons divided into two half-cantons each
- twenty-three from 1979 to 1999, due to the secession of the canton of Jura from Bern.

Nidwalden and Obwalden form traditional subdivisions of Unterwalden. Basel-Stadt and Basel-Landschaft, as well as Appenzell Inner- and Ausserrhoden, are half cantons, resulting from the division of Basel and Appenzell, respectively. The Swiss Federal Constitution of 1999 abandoned the use of the term "half-canton" as an official designation, so that the official number of cantons became 26 - the former half-cantons being now referred to as "cantons with half a cantonal vote" officially, even though they are still commonly referred to as "half-cantons".

With the exception of Lucerne, Schwyz and Ticino, the cantonal flags are simply transposed versions of the cantonal coats of arms. In case of Lucerne and Ticino, whose flags consist of fields of different colours divided per fess (horizontally), the coats of arms are of the same colours divided per pale (vertically). The coat of arms of Schwyz has the cross moved from the (hoist) canton to the sinister canton with respect to the flag.

The coats of arms of the Thirteen Cantons are based on medieval signs, originating as war flags and as emblems used on seals. For war flags, a distinction was made between Banner and Fähnlein, the former was the large war flag used only in the case of a full levy of cantonal troops for a major operation. The latter was a smaller flag used for minor military expeditions. The Banner was considered a sacred possession, usually kept in a church. Losing the banner to an enemy force was a great shame and invited mockery from other cantons.

Pope Julius II in recognition of the support he received from Swiss mercenaries against France in 1512 granted the Swiss the title of Ecclesiasticae libertatis defensores and gave them two large banners, besides a blessed sword and hat. Papal legate Matthias Schiner in addition gave to the Swiss cantons and their associates a total of 42 costly silk banners with augmentations, the so-called Juliusbanner. Some of these banners survive, of the cantonal ones notably those of Zürich and Solothurn.

The fashion of arranging cantonal insignia in shields (escutcheons) as coats of arms arises in the late 15th century. The Tagsatzung in Baden was presented with stained glass representations of all cantons c. 1501. In these designs, two cantonal escutcheons were shown side by side, below a shield bearing the Imperial Eagle and a crown, flanked by two banner-bearers. Based on these, there arose a tradition of representing cantonal arms in stained glass (Standesscheiben), alive throughout the early modern period and continued in the modern state.

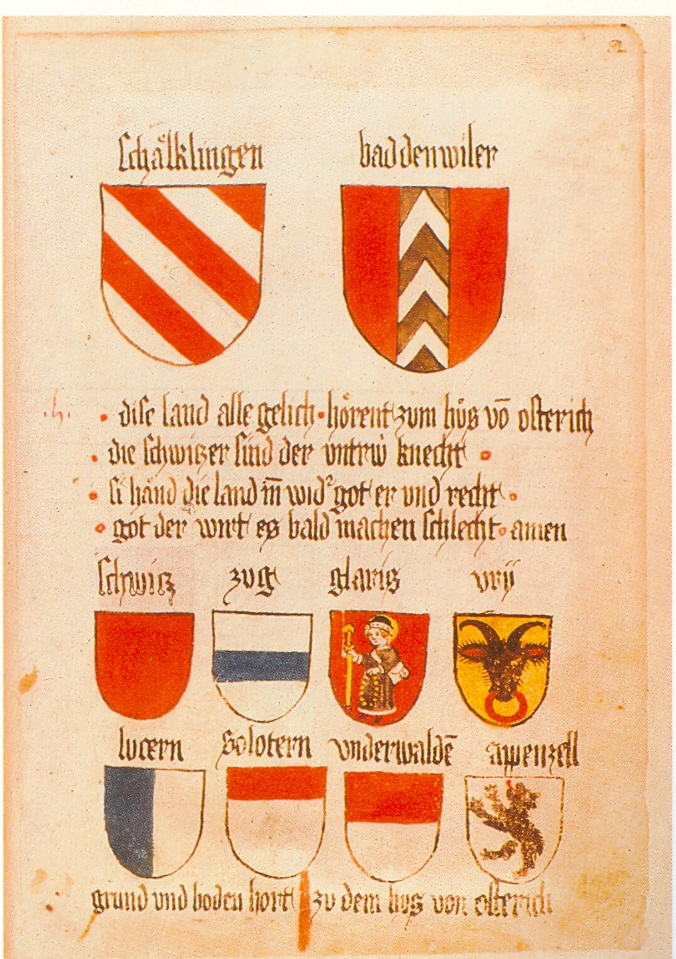
Depiction of the coat of arms of six of the Eight Cantons (omitting Zürich and Bern, but adding Solothurn and Appenzell) in a 1459 manuscript made for Albert VI, Archduke of Austria. The text denounces "the Swiss" as "faithless vassals" who hold their territories illegally.

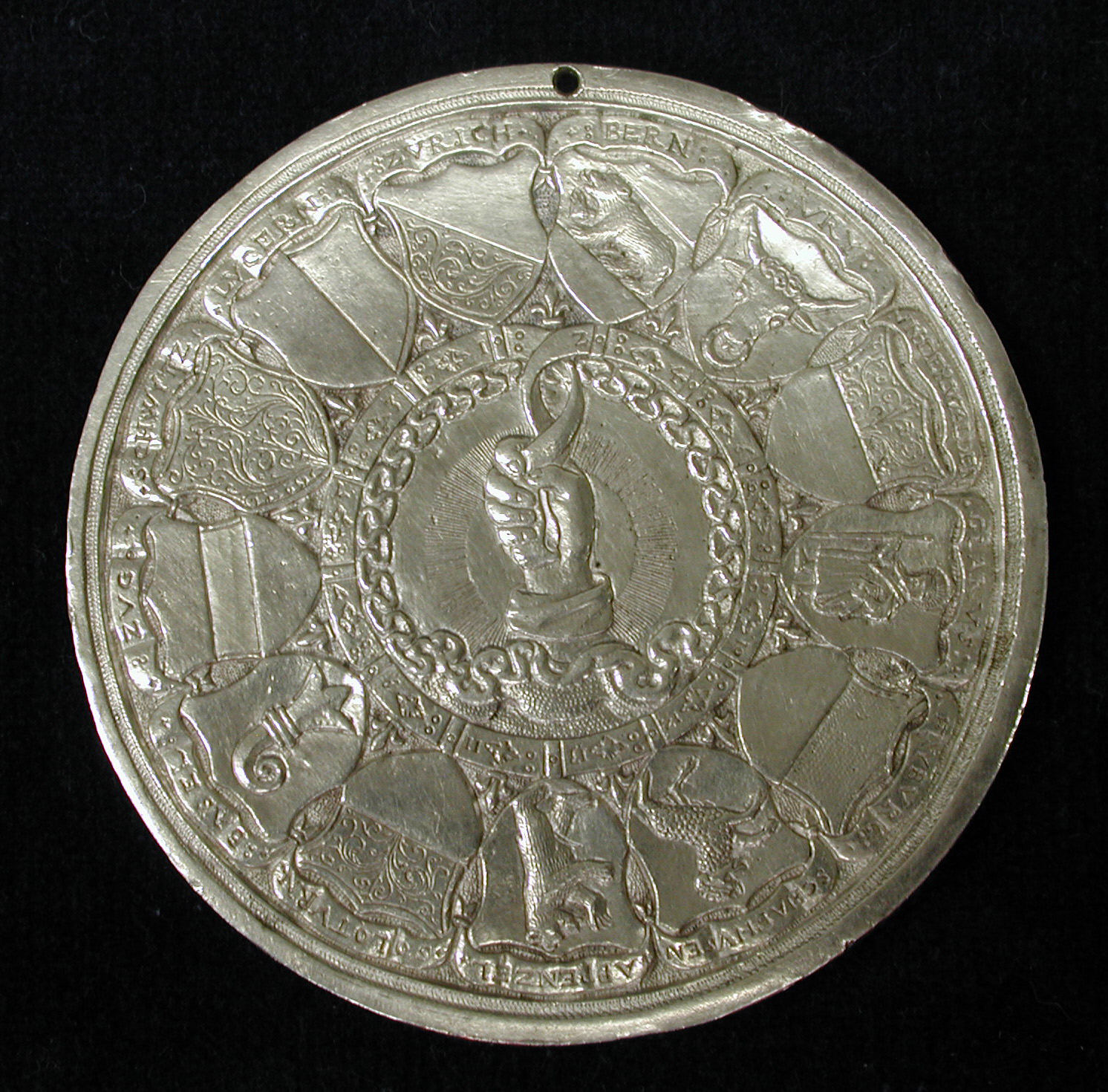
The coats of arms of the Thirteen Cantons as shown on the "baptismal medal" or Patenpfennig presented by the Confederacy to Princess Claude of Valois (by Jacob Stampfer of Zürich (1547).

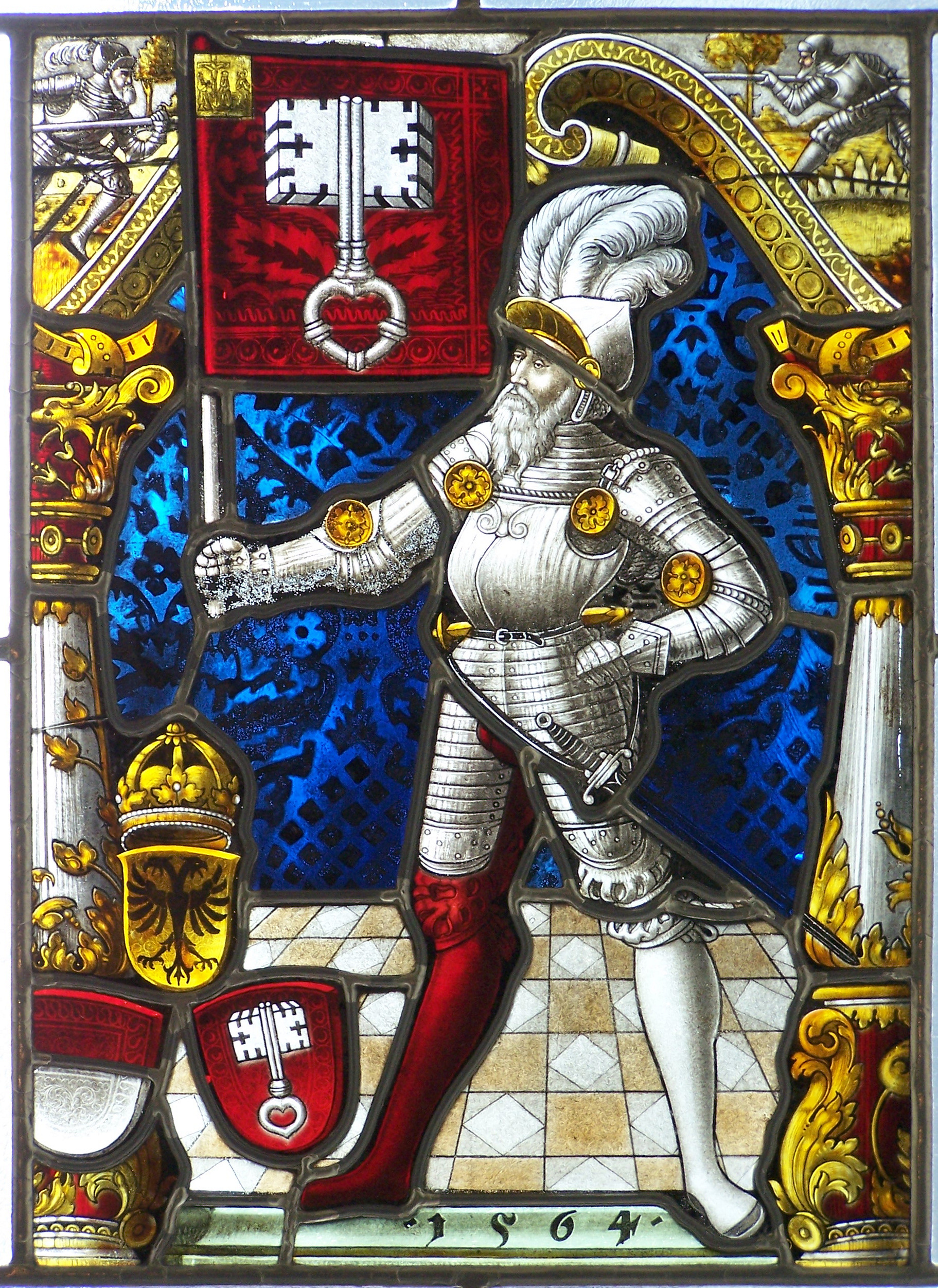
Standesscheibe of Unterwalden (1564)

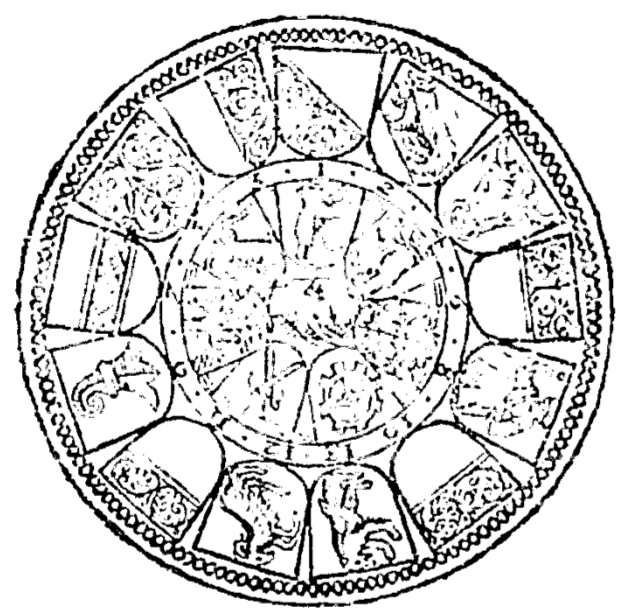
Depiction of the coats of arms of the Thirteen Cantons (title page of La Republique des Suisses by Josias Simmler, printed in 1577)

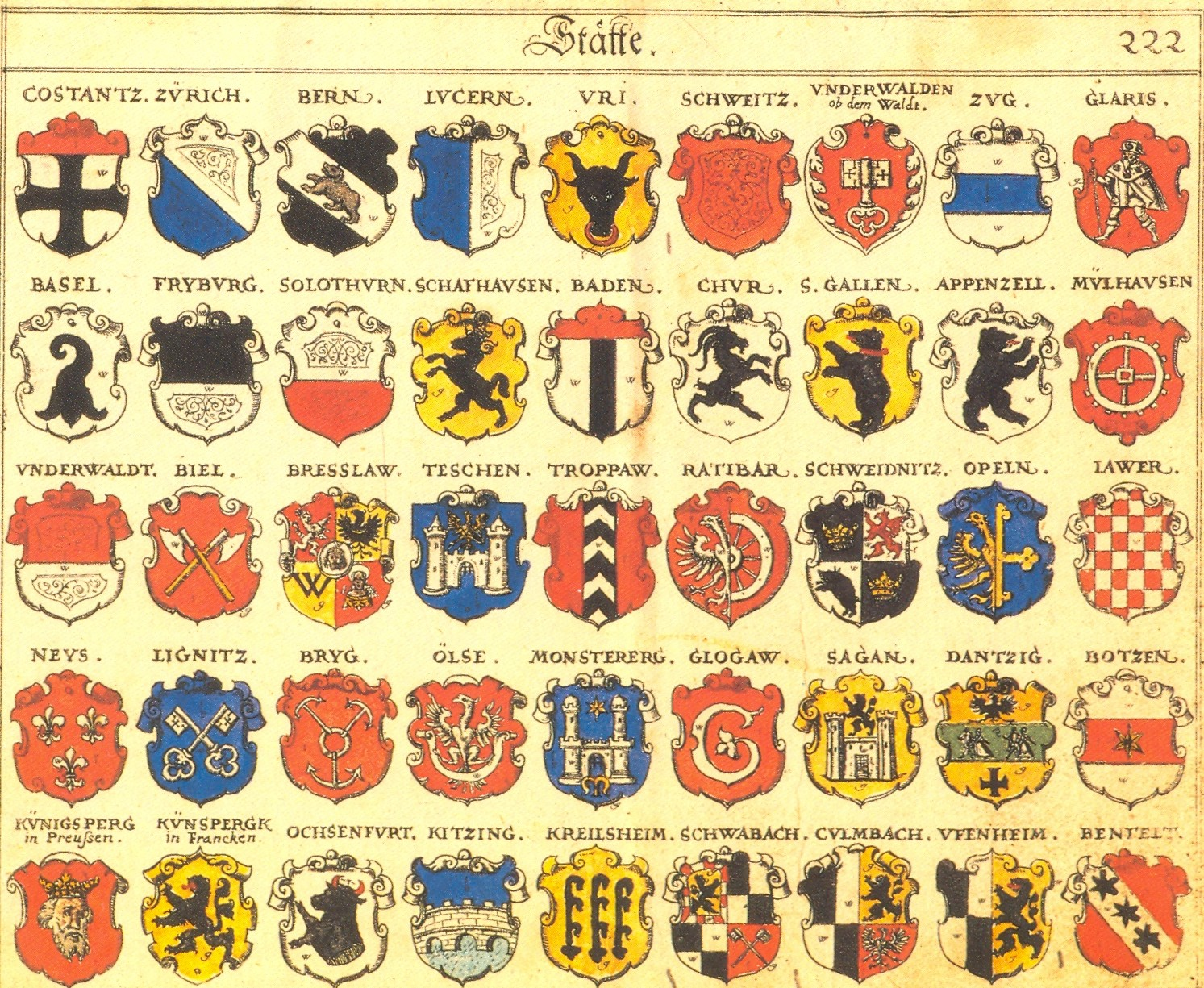
Coats of arms of the Thirteen Cantons as part of a larger collection of coats of arms of free cities by Johann Siebmacher (1605).

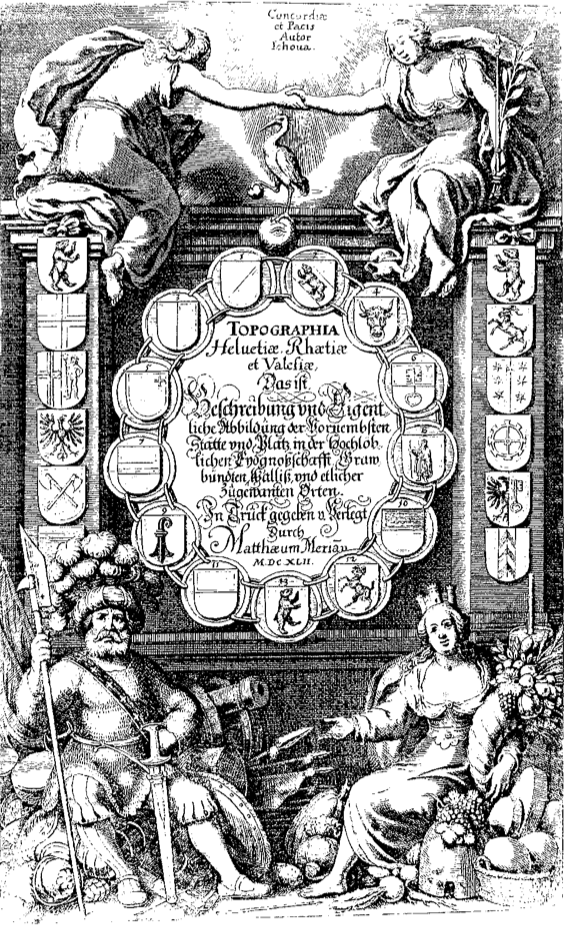
Depiction of the coats of arms of the thirteen cantons and their associates, printed in 1642.

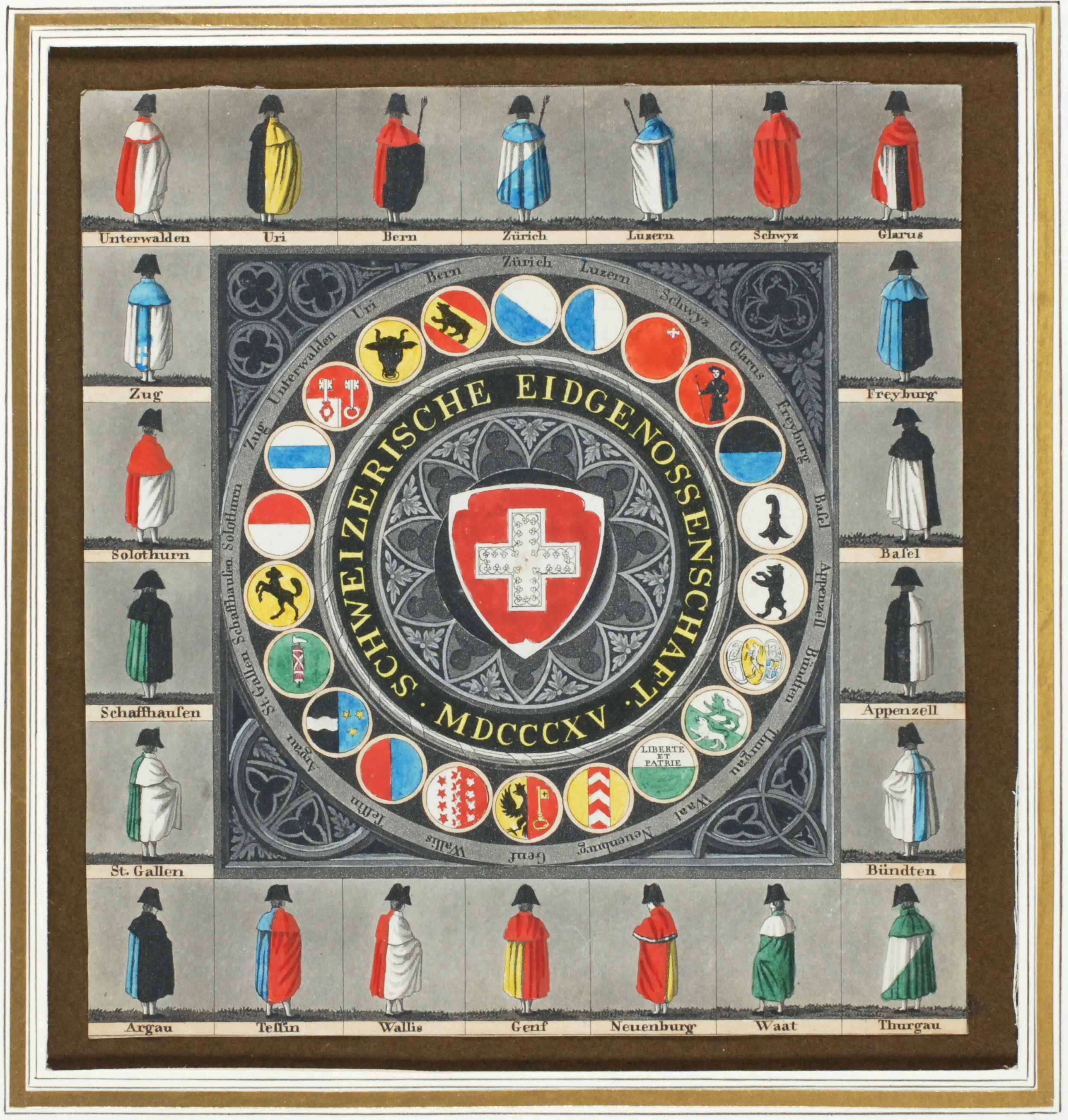
Print of a Wappenscheibe of the 22 coats of arms of the restored Swiss Confederacy (1815)

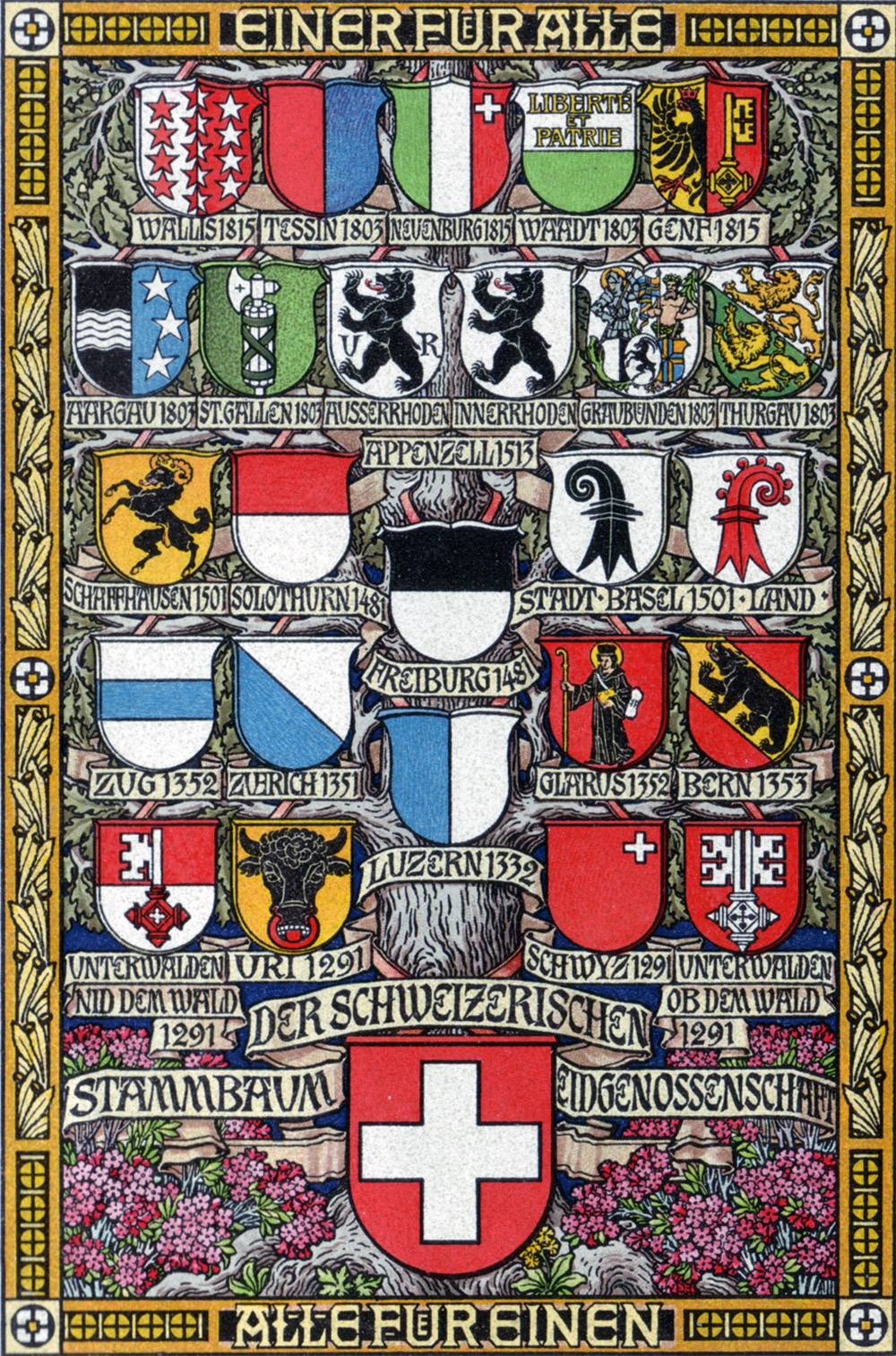
Depiction of the coats of arms (including half-cantons) as they stood in 1912.

=== Zürich ===
The flag of Zürich is derived from a blue-and-white design attested since the 1220s, the diagonal division of the flag is first attested 1389.

The flag of Zürich was adorned by a red Schwenkel since 1273. This was regarded as a mark of sovereignty and honour by the people of Zürich, but the Schwenkel was otherwise used as a mark of "shame", identifying replacement flags used after a real flag was captured by an enemy This led to a misunderstanding after the Battle of Nancy, when the Duke of Lorraine removed the Schwenkel from the Zürich flag, stating that with the present victory, Zürich had "erased its shame". The perplexed Zürich troops later quietly re-attached the Schwenkel.

Zürich attached the Swiss cross in the red Schwenkel rather than in the main flag, and this may have contributed to the development of the flag of Switzerland (placing the white cross in a red field by default).

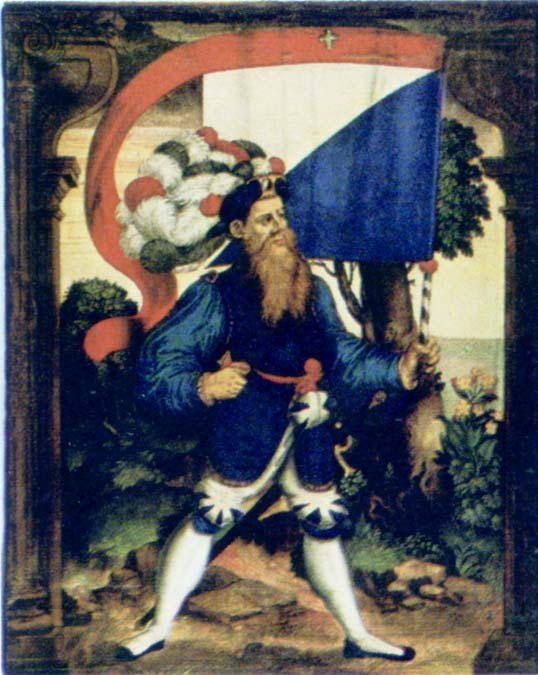
Depiction of the flag with Schwenkel (Humbert Mareschet, 1585)

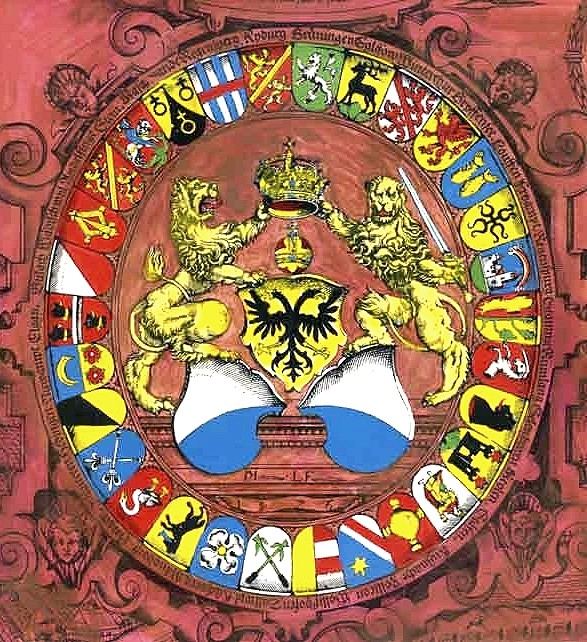
Heraldic depiction of Zürich as an imperial city (Murerplan, 1576)

=== Bern ===
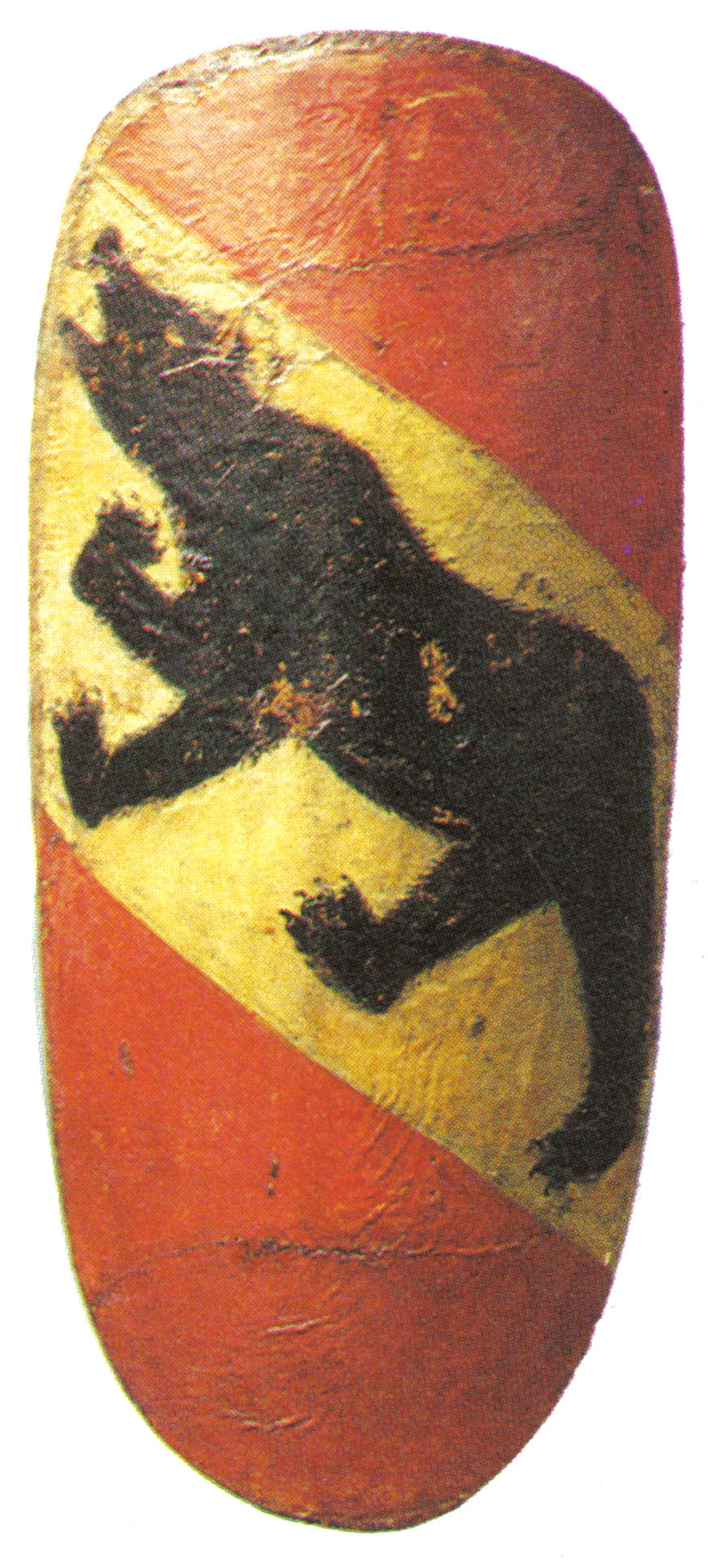
14th-century infantry shield with the Bernese arms

The city of Bern is a Zähringer foundation of 1160. In the 13th century, its flag showed a black bear in a white field, changed to the current red-and-yellow diagonal arrangement in 1289. Bern also had a war flag with a simple red-and-black horizontal division. The cantonal colours remain red and black.

=== Lucerne ===
The blue-and-white flag is attested from 1386. The vertical division of the coat or arms has been explained as due to a gonfalon type of banner used by Lucerne, hung from a horizontal crossbar, which was also used as a flagstaff, so that the flag was turned by 90 degrees when carried in battle.

=== Uri ===
The flag originates in the 13th century. It was carried in the battles of Morgarten (1315) and Laupen (1339). One 14th century flag is preserved in the town hall of Altdorf.

=== Schwyz ===
Schwyz used a solid red war flag (Blutbanner) from 1240.

From the 14th century, a depiction of the crucifixion was sometimes shown on the flag.

Pope Sixtus IV confirmed this addition in 1480, stating explicitly that the crown of thorns and the nails (Arma Christi) should be shown.

The coat of arms remained solid red throughout the 16th to 18th centuries, but from the 17th century in depictions in print (in black and white), the cross was sometimes shown.

The modern design of flag and coat of arms with the cross in one corner dates to 1815. The precise definition of the proportions of the cross dates to 1963.

The Blutbanner

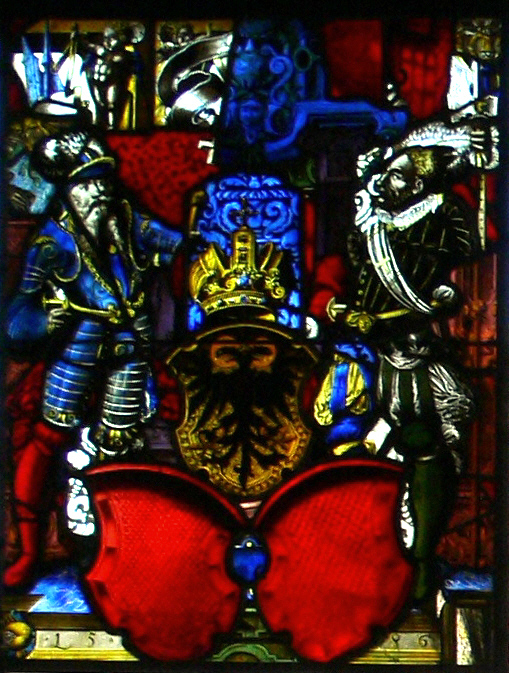
Standesscheibe of Schwyz (1586), showing the solid red coat of arms

=== Unterwalden ===
Flag of Obwalden until 1816

Coat of arms of Unterwalden as shown during the 16th century

Coat of arms of Unterwalden during the 17th and 18th centuries

The flag Unterwalden, as the canton itself, has a complicated history, on one hand due to the rivalry of the constituent half-cantons Obwalden and Nidwalden, and on the other because its historical flag was identical to that of Solothurn.

The war flag of Obwalden was plain red and white, first recorded in 1309. Nidwalden tended to be dominated by Obwalden and usually fought under the same banner.

A single key was used in the seal of Nidwalden from the mid 13th century. This seal was used for both Obwalden and Nidwalden (i.e. the united canton of Unterwalden) during the early 14th century. The addition et vallis superioris "and the upper valley" was scratched into the seal to reflect this. At this point, there was a seal (with the key) and a war flag (red-and-white), but no coat of arms. From c. 1360, Obwalden and Nidwalden were separated into two independent territories, while keeping a single vote in the confederate diet. Because of the "and the upper valley" addition scratched into the seal, Nidwalden began using a new seal of its own, and the seal of Unterwalden, formerly the seal of Nidwalden, now was used by Obwalden. The seal of Nidwalden now showed St. Peter with his keys.

Nidwalden began using the double-key as a design on its war flag from the early 15th century. The red-and-white flag of Unterwalden was now also the flag of Obwalden if both half-cantons were to be represented separately. This was the situation as the fashion of coats of arms was introduced in the late 15th century. The early Standesscheiben of the first decade of the 16th century show the double-key as the coat of arms and flag of Nidwalden, while Obwalden has the red-and-white design in both its flag and its coat of arms.

During the 17th and 18th centuries, the coat of arms of the combined canton of Unterwalden came to be depicted as a superposition of the red-and-white flag of Obwalden and the double-key of Nidwalden.

Only in the mid 18th century does the single-key symbol (taken from the 13th-century seal) appear occasionally in coats of arms of Obwalden. This design was introduced as the official coats of arms of Obwalden in 1816, and the same design came gradually into use also for the flag of Obwalden, which also resolved the problem of the Obwalden flag being identical to that of Solothurn.

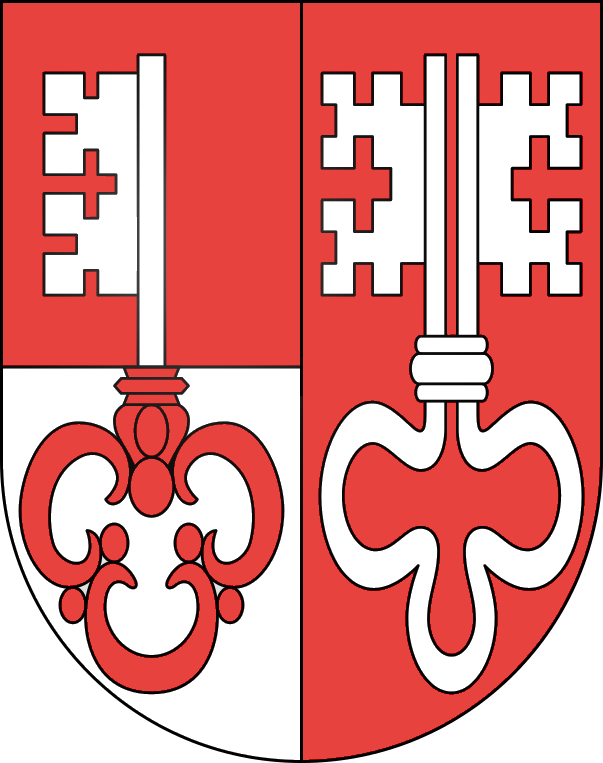

=== Glarus ===
The flag of Glarus ultimately goes back to a banner of Saint Fridolin used in the Battle of Näfels in 1388, because the former banner of Glarus had been captured by the people of Rapperswil in a previous raid.

After this, Glarus used the image of the saint in its banners. During the 15th and 16th century, these images varied considerably. Only by the beginning 17th century a standard design was established, showing the Saint as a pilgrim in silver on a red field. The modern design shows the pilgrim in black, inspired by a banner shown in Glarus claimed as the original banner of 1388. The current official design dates to 1959.

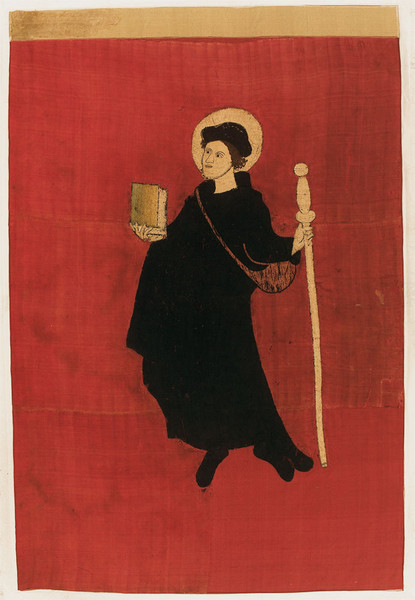
Flag of St. Fridolin, on exhibit in the Glarus cantonal museum, Näfels.

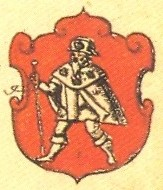
Coat of arms of Glarus in 1605

=== Fribourg ===
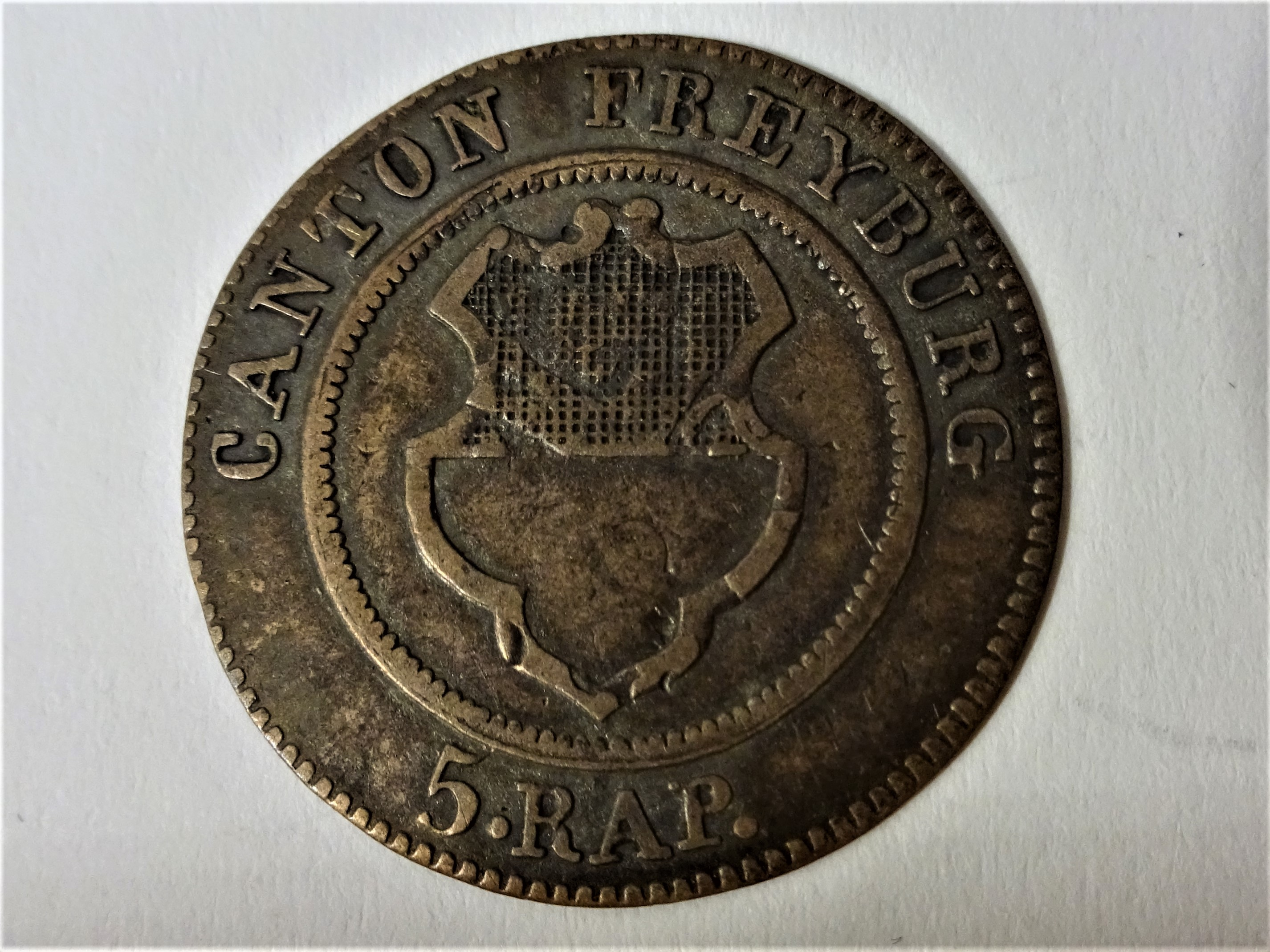
The Fribourg coat of arms on a Konkordatsbatzen (1830)

The oldest seal of the city dates to 1225 and shows the Zähringer coat of arms. Fribourg became independent from the Duchy of Savoy in 1477. The adoption of the black and white banner dates to this period, first recorded in 1478. In the 17th century, the city coat of arms is shown as quartered, with the city's black and white in the 1st and 4th quarters, and three towers in white on a blue field in the 2nd and 3rd quarters. The cantonal colours in the 17th and 18th century, and into the early 19th century, are black and blue, while the coat of arms is shown as white and black. In 1830, the canton of Friburg adopts black and white for the cantonal coat of arms and as cantonal colours.

=== Solothurn ===
1443 (1394?)

=== Basel ===
Coat of arms of the Prince-Bishopric of Basel

The peculiar heraldic shape of the crozier (the Baselstab or "Basel staff") dates to the 13th century, used in the seals of the bishops of Basel.

It was introduced as heraldic emblem in 1385. From this time, the Baselstab in black represented the city, and the same emblem in red represented the bishop.

The staff represented was based on an actual artefact, a gilded staff recorded for the 12th century. It is of unknown origin or significance (beyond its obvious status of bishop's crozier), but it is assumed to have represented a relic, possibly attributed to Saint Germanus of Granfelden.

The banner of the city of Basel with the same design was introduced in the early 15th century, as the city gained greater independence from the ruling bishops of Basel.

The flag and coat of arms of Basel-Landschaft was introduced in 1834, from the coat of arms of Liestal. It represents red Baselstab historically used by the bishops, but with the addition of seven crockets (Krabben, in local dialect also dubbed Siebedupf) and turned to face sinister, representing the secession and "facing away" from the city.

=== Schaffhausen ===
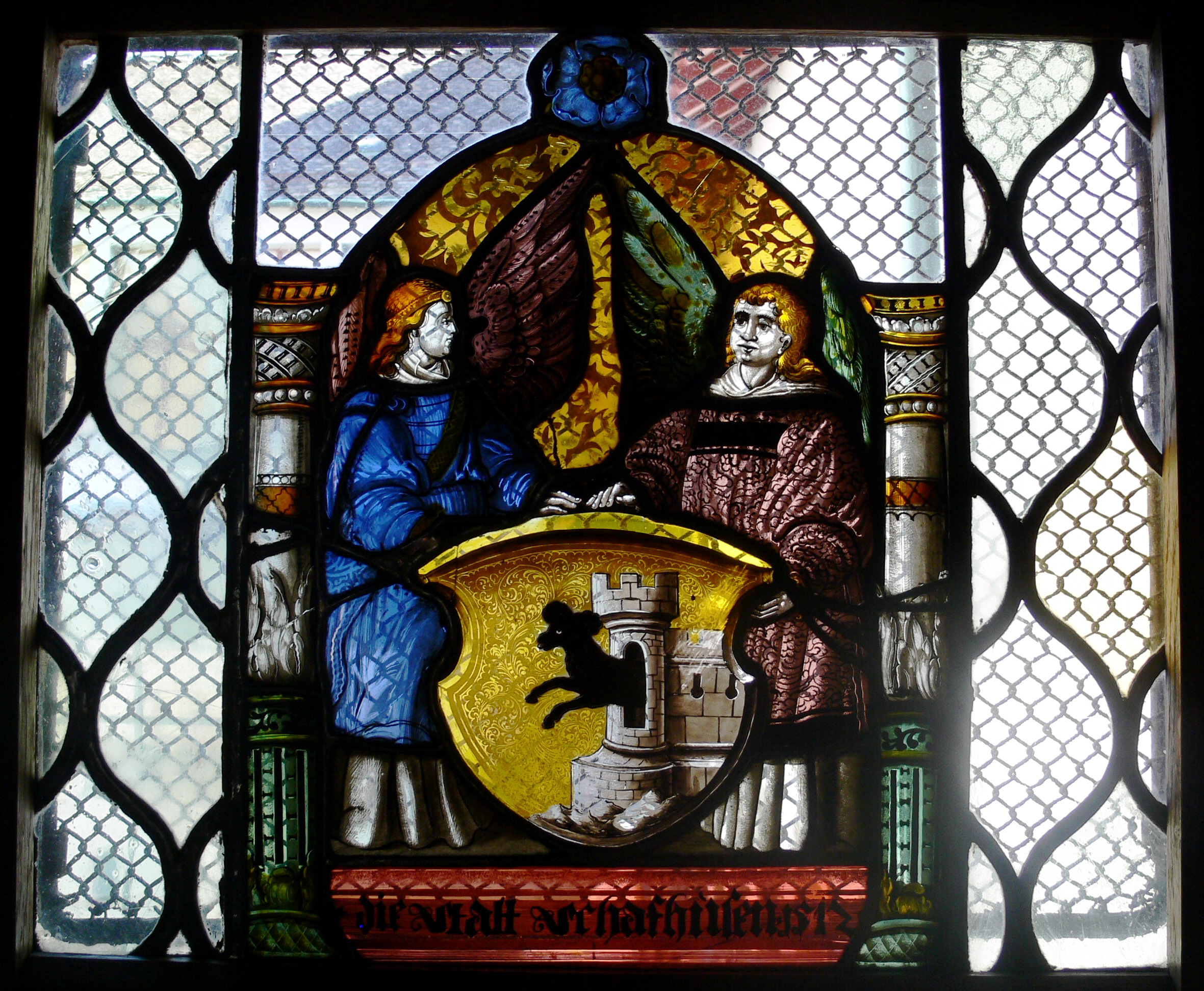
Standesscheibe with the old form of the coat of arms where the ram is shown as leaping from the window of a tower.

The flag is documented from 1218. The crown was added to the ram in 1512. The ram was originally rampant with only the rear left hoof on the ground, but in the 1940s this was changed to the salient position with both rear hooves on the ground.

=== Appenzell ===

The flag is based on that of the Abbot of St. Gallen, who was the feudal lord of Appenzell until 1403. The flag of the abbey showed a bear on a yellow field, and the independent territory Appenzell changed the field to white for its own flag. Before its independence, Appenzell had a flag of a bear statant (on all fours) on a honeycombed field, attested from 1377.

Appenzell split into its two half-cantons as a result of the Swiss Reformation, in 1597. The letters V and R in the Ausserrhoden flag stand for Ussere Rhoden "outer districts" (V representing /u/). The oldest representation of the letters is found on a flag, presumably of the 17th century and known to have been in use in 1743. On this flag, the bear is facing away from the hoist, with the letters V and R on the hoist side, behind the bear's back. Above the V is the inscription SOLI, corresponding to a lost DEO GLORIA on the reverse side. Other military flags with the V and R on either side of the bear are known from the late 18th century.

=== St. Gallen ===
The coat of arms of the city of St. Gallen like the cantonal coat of arms of Appenzell since the 14th century has shown the bear taken from the flag of the abbot of St. Gall. But the canton of St. Gallen is unrelated to the historical territory of its eponymous capital, having been patched together from eight unrelated territories of other Cantons in 1798. The cantonal arms and flag are an original design by David von Gonzenbach, created in 1803. In the original design, the weapon contained in the fasces was a halberd, but this was changed to the axe in 1843. There were a number of other design changes during the 20th century; from the 1930s until 1951, a black Swiss cross was placed on the axe blade to avoid association with the fasces as used as a symbol of Italian fascism.

=== Grisons ===
The flag of Grisons was adopted in 1933. From 1815 to 1933, the canton had used various combinations of the three coats of arms of the historical Three Leagues. The modern design combines simplified versions of the historical coats of arms. A combined coat of arms with the same division of the shield as in the modern version (but with the position of the leagues of God's House and of the Ten Jurisdiction reversed) is already found on the Patenpfenning minted by Jacob Stampfer in 1547.

Arms of the League of God's House

Arms of the Grey League

Arms of the League of the Ten Jurisdictions

=== Aargau ===
Aargau (Argovia) is the ancient name of the march between Alemannia and Burgundy, but it never was an independent canton historically. Since 1712, the territory of the modern canton had been divided between Zürich and Bern. The canton of Aargau was created as an administrative division of the Helvetic Republic, and its flag is an original design by Samuel Ringier-Seelmatter of Zofingen (1767–1826), dating to 1803. The current official design, specifying the stars as five-pointed, dates to 1930.

=== Thurgau ===
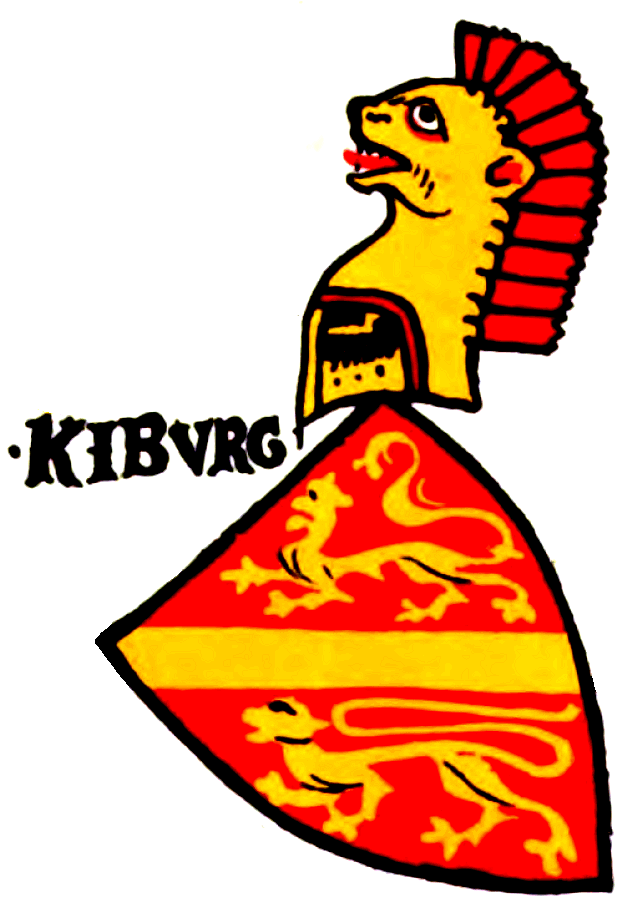
Coat of arms of the House of Kyburg in the Zurich armorial (c. 1340)

Like Aargau, Thurgau (Turgovia) was historically a subject territory of the confederacy, and was created as a canton of the Helvetic Republic. The flag design is an ad hoc creation of 1803, based on the two lions in the coat of arms of the House of Kyburg which ruled Thurgau in the 13th century. The green-and-white were regarded as "revolutionary" colours in 1803, also introduced in the coats of arms of St. Gallen and Vaud, but the placement of a yellow lion on white is a violation of heraldic principles, and also creates a visibility problem. There have been suggestions to correct this, including a 1938 suggestion to use a solid green field divided by a diagonal white line, but they were not successful.

=== Ticino ===
The flag is an 1803 design, but its designer or intended symbolism have not been recorded. The convention of displaying the flag per fess is apparently inspired by Lucerne.

=== Vaud ===
The design dates to 1803, based on the flag used in the Vaudois insurrection against Bernese rule in the 1790s, which was green and inscribed with Liberté, Egalité in white lettering. From this, the white and green became the "revolutionary" colours of cantons newly created from former subject territories of the confederacy, also used in the flags of the cantons of St. Gallen and Thurgau, and a green flag was also briefly used by Aargau. The lettering in the Vaudois flag was in black or in green during 1803–1819, the gold was introduced with the military flag as Vaud organised its army in 1819. As such, it violates the heraldic rule of tincture which states that gold (or yellow) may not be placed upon silver (or white).

=== Valais ===
The Bishop of Sion used a vertically divided red-and-white war flag from c. 1220. The coat of arms of Valais originates in 1613, as the subject territories of the bishop were united into a republic, the stars representing the individual Dixains. There were six stars in 1613, augmented to seven in 1628. In the 1803 Act of Mediation, Napoleon separated the Valais from the restored Swiss Confederacy, and in 1810 he annexed it into the Department of Simplon. At this point the number of Dixains and the number of stars in the flag was increased to twelve. The thirteenth star was added as the Valais joined the restored Swiss Confederacy in 1815, with the creation of Conthey as the thirteenth Dixain.

=== Neuchâtel ===
Coat of arms of Neuchâtel until 1848

The flag is unrelated to the historical flag of the town of Neuchâtel, which had been in use from 1350, and as cantonal flag from 1815 until 1848, and which remains part of the town's coat of arms. The canton of Neuchâtel was admitted to the restored Swiss Confederacy in 1815, but with the peculiar reservation that it owed nominal fealty to the king of Prussia. This lingering monarchism led to a republican coup in 1848, under the flag that would later become the cantonal flag. The conflict between monarchists by 1856 threatened to devolve into full civil war, but in 1857, Frederick William IV of Prussia renounced all claims to Neuchâtel, and the 1848 revolutionary banner was made the official cantonal flag. Use of the flag remained disputed, and during the 20th century there were three unsuccessful attempts to reintroduce the historical flag of 1350 by popular vote.

=== Geneva ===
The flag of Geneva is the historical flag of the city of Geneva, showing the Imperial Eagle and a Key of St. Peter (symbolizing the status of Geneva as Reichsstadt and as episcopal seat, respectively), in use since the 15th century. The flag of the medieval Prince Bishopric of Geneva showed two golden Keys of Peter in the red field of the imperial Blutbanner since 1293.

The full heraldic achievement of Geneva includes a crest in the form of half a sun inscribed with JHS (for Jesus Hominum Salvator), and a scroll below the shield with the motto Post Tenebras Lux.

The coat of arms of the city of Geneva was adopted as the cantonal coat of arms upon the accession of Geneva as a city-canton to the restored Swiss Confederacy in 1815.

=== Jura ===
Coat of arms of the Prince-Bishopric of Basel

The separatist movement which eventually led to the canton's creation emerged in the 1940s, and the flag is a design by Paul Boesch, dated to 1943. The crozier symbolizes the former Prince-Bishopric of Basel, the seven stripes represent the seven districts of the Bernese Jura. It was officially recognized as a regional flag by Bern from the early 1950s. The canton of Jura was created in 1979 after a referendum, but only three of the seven districts opted to join. The seven stripes were retained in the cantonal flag regardless, and there remains some irredentism calling for a restored unity of all seven districts.

== See also ==
- Flag of Switzerland
- Cantons of Switzerland
- Flags and arms of municipalities of Switzerland

== Bibliography ==
- Walter Angst. A Panoply of Colours: The Cantonal Banners of Switzerland and the Swiss National Flag. 1992. ISBN 9789993300472.
