= Juliusbanner =

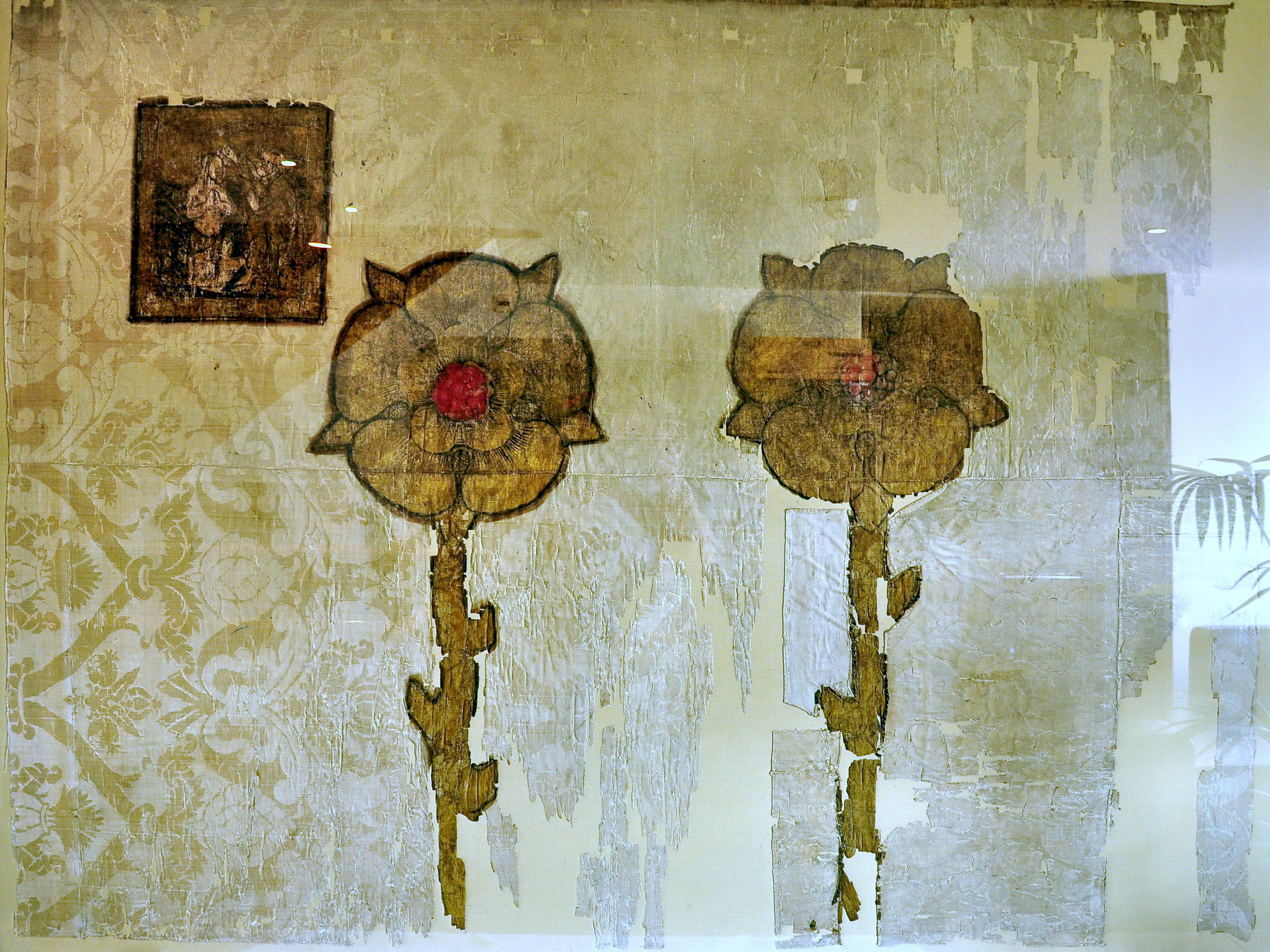
Juliusbanner of Rapperswil (Rathaus Rapperswil). The augmentation in this banner consists of the two roses being rendered in gold instead of red. The Zwickelbild shows the baptism of Jesus.

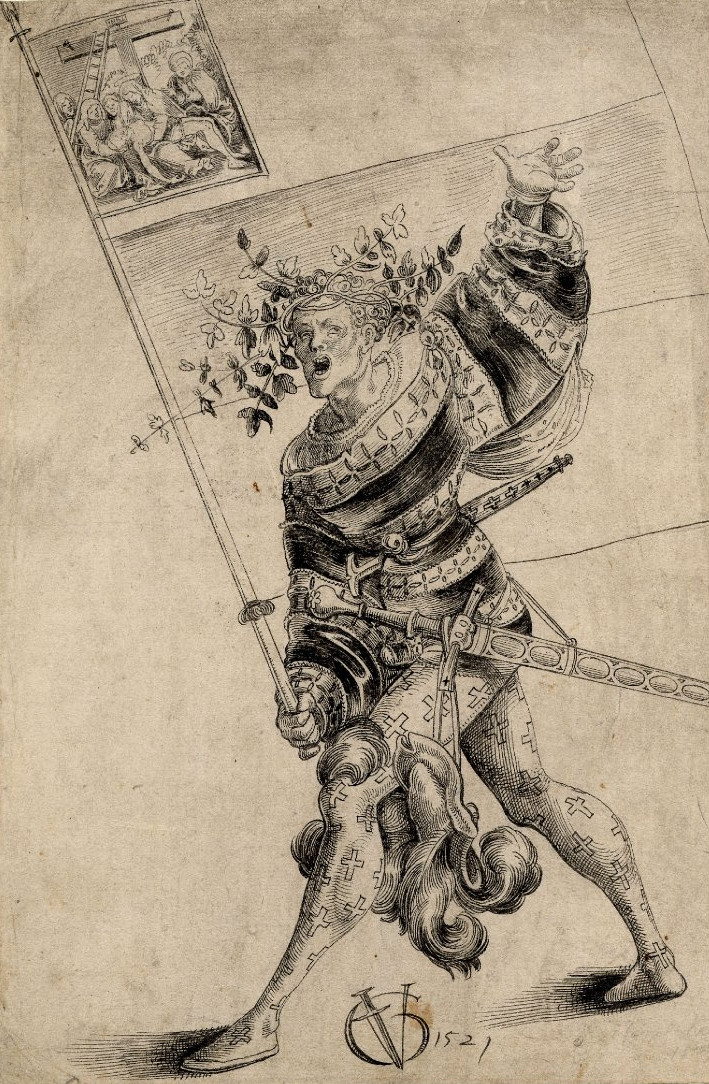
Bearer of the Juliusbanner of Zug, drawing by Urs Graf, dated 1521. The banner is shown with a Zwickelbild of the descent from the cross.

The Juliusbanner ("Julius banners") are elaborate silk banners given to the cantons and other entities of the Old Swiss Confederacy by Pope Julius II in 1512, in recognition of the support he received from Swiss mercenaries against France in the Pavia campaign (Pavier Feldzug).

The Swiss contingents succeeded in forcing the French forces to abandon Pavia on 14 June. As a reward for this service, Julius on 5 July granted to the Swiss the title of Ecclesiasticae libertatis defensores and gave them two large banners, besides a blessed sword and hat. The Julius banners themselves were given by papal legate Matthias Schiner. This gift was a matter of considerable prestige for the recipients, seen as such both by the recipients and by their neighbours. This was true especially of the blessed sword and hat, which had previously only been bestowed on kings and princes, while the Swiss were still considered not fully sovereign, but subjects of the Holy Roman Emperor. The Swiss chroniclers of the time gave a detailed description of the gifts, and a great woodcut was commissioned, probably still in 1512, which shows the papal banners, sword and hat surrounded by sixteen banner-bearers holding the Juliusbanner of the twelve cantons, plus those of Appenzell, Valais, St. Gallen and Chur. Brantôme later commented from a French point of view on the excessive "flattery and vanity" bestowed on the Swiss in view of their crushing defeat by the French only three years later, at the Battle of Marignano.

The banners were in expensive damask silk and included heraldic augmentations, and in the canton a Zwickelbild an image rendered in needlework of precious thread showing a religious scene. Some of the recipients by implication first received the Bannerrecht, the right to raise troops under their own banner. After the Swiss Reformation, as part of the recatholization effort after the Second War of Kappel, this right was revoked for the Freie Ämter, and the Juliusbanner confiscated.

== Recipients ==
The full list of recipients is not recorded, and has been reconstructed by modern historians. In spite of the sixteen banners represented in the woodcut of 1512, there seems to have been a considerably larger number, as the banners were not presented to the cantons of the confederacy specifically so much as to those territories that sent mercenary contingents to the Pavia campaign. The superior quality of the cantonal banners was, however, not equalled in the banners given to the associates; their charges are mostly painted instead of applied in costly needlework. An exception is the banner of Saanen, which was made in the same quality as the cantonal banners, an honour presumably due to the chaplain of Schiner, Hans Huswürt, being a native of the town (Durrer 1907/8:353).

Hecht (1973) gives a list of 42 recipients, and argues that since a Venetian observer recorded 42 Swiss contingents taking part in the Pavia campaign, this list likely is complete. The 42 recipients listed by Hecht (p. 142) are:

- Thirteen cantons of the Swiss Confederacy: Zürich, Bern, Lucerne, Uri, Schwyz, Obwalden, Nidwalden, Zug, Glarus, Basel, Fribourg, Solothurn, Schaffhausen
- Ten to Associates of the Confederary: Appenzell (accession as full canton in 1513), Abbey of St. Gallen, Alte Landschaft and city of St. Gallen, the Grey League, the League of Ten Jurisdictions, Valais, Biel, Mulhouse and Rottweil
- Ten to the free cities of Baden, Bremgarten, Chur, Diessenhofen, Frauenfeld, Mellingen, Rapperswil, Willisau, Winterthur and Stein am Rhein.
- Nine to lordships and condominiums: Saanen, Toggenburg, Kyburg, Elgg, Sargans, Freie Ämter, the subjects of the bishop of Constance in Thurgau, and two subject territories of Lucerne, Rothenburg and Ruswil.

The banners of Nidwalden and Mulhouse were not part of the original gift by Schiner. Unterwalden had received a single banner, which ended up being kept in Obwalden. Both Nidwalden and Mulhouse complained bitterly to the pope for having been left out, and they received their banners from the pope directly. The Nidwalden banner had an inscription running along its edge claiming that the people of Nidwalden had already in the year 388 fought for pope Anastasius and received their original banner on that occasion.

== Surviving specimens ==
A number of these banners survive. In some instances it is unclear if the surviving banner is an original or a copy, or even a later forgery. Well-preserved are the originals of Zurich (kept in the Swiss National Museum, Lucerne), Schwyz (kept in the Museum of the Swiss Charters of Confederation), Uri (kept in Rathaus Altdorf) and Obwalden. The Fribourg banner is damaged, about half of its cloth and the Zwickelbild survive; of the Bernese banner only the Zwickelbild. Also considered originals by Durrer (1907/8:352) are the damaged specimens of Biel, Saanen, St. Gallen (city), St. Gallen (abbey), Diessenhofen, Frauenfeld, Rothenburg. The city of Basel immediately commissioned a copy of the banner; both the original and the copy were lost, but the Zwickelbild from the copy's canton survives.

Also preserved are the banners of Nidwalden (only the silk cloth survives, the gold thread was plundered in the French invasion of 1798), kept in Rathaus Stans; Solothurn, kept in Altes Zeughaus; Toggenburg, kept in Rathaus Lichtensteig; Rapperswil, kept in Rathaus Rapperswil; Frauenfeld, kept in the Historical Museum of Thurgau, and Saanen, kept in Hisorisches Museum Bern.

== See also ==
- Flags and coats of arms of cantons of Switzerland
- Transalpine campaigns of the Old Swiss Confederacy
- Swiss Guard
