= Standesscheibe =

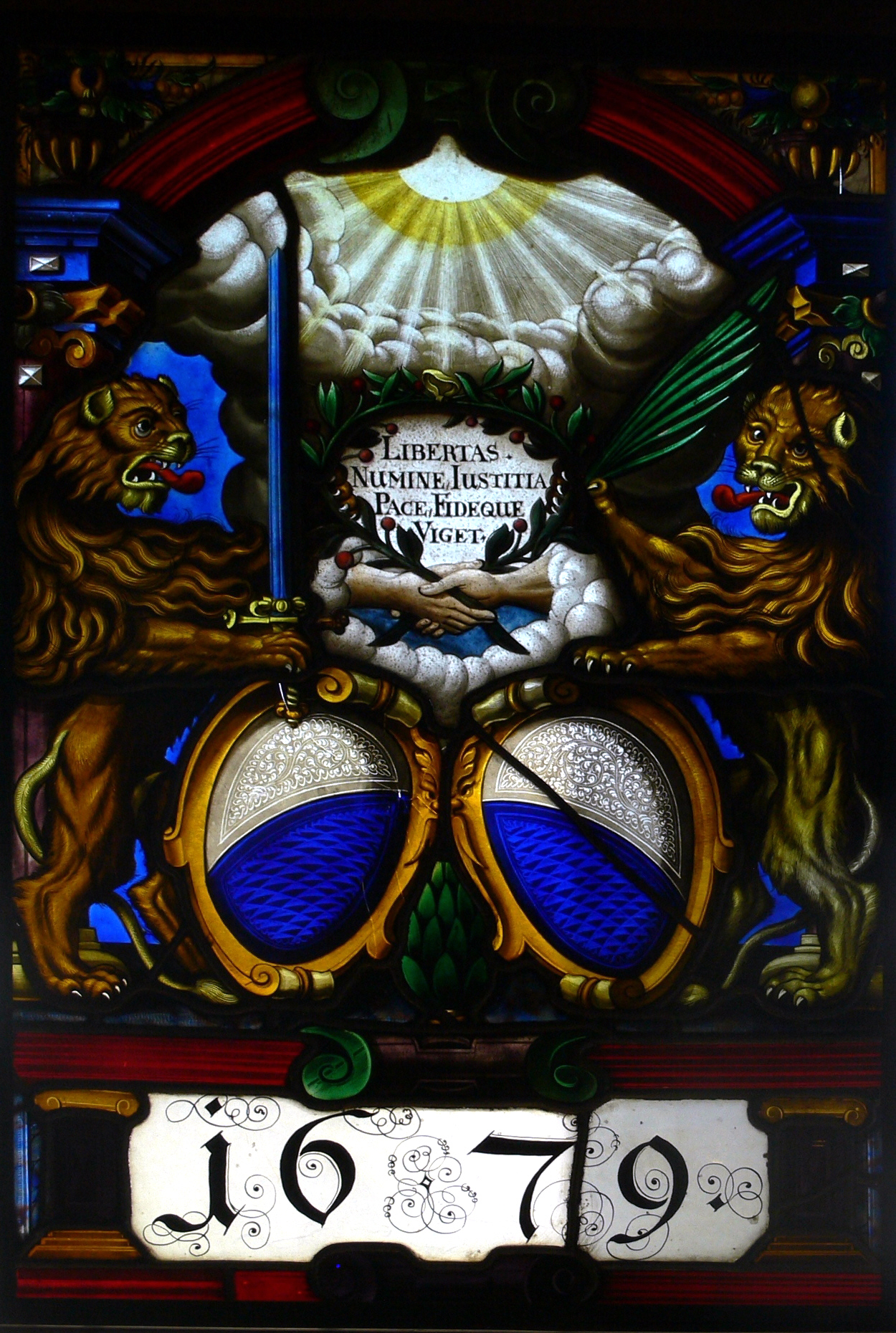
Standesscheibe of Zürich (1679)

A Standesscheibe ([ʃtandəsˈʃaɪ̯bə], "cantonal pane") is stained glass that presents the coat of arms of a canton of the Old Swiss Confederacy. It is sometimes arranged in a complete armorial of all cantonal coats of arms of Switzerland. A standesscheibe is an example of a wappenscheibe, a coat of arms depicted in a stained glass window.

The usage of Standesscheibe became fashionable in 1485 along with the Swiss illustrated chronicles. This was a result of increased national pride due to recent victories in the Burgundian Wars.

In 1501, a full set of cantonal Standesscheiben, made by Lukas Zeiner of Zürich, was presented to the hall of the Swiss diet in Baden.

Standesscheiben usage remained active in Switzerland throughout the 16th and 17th centuries, and to some extent continued in the 19th and early 20th centuries with the coats of arms of the cantons of modern Switzerland.

== See also ==
- Cantonal coats of arms (Switzerland)
