= Köniz uprising =

1513 revolt in the canton of Bern, Switzerland

The Köniz uprising (German: Könizer Aufstand; French: soulèvement de Köniz) was a 1513 revolt in the canton of Bern, directed against members of the city's council who were receiving secret pensions from the Kingdom of France. It took place at the height of the Italian Wars, and was contemporary with similar unrest in Solothurn and the Onion War in Lucerne.

== Outbreak and concessions ==
Against the background of the military conflicts in northern Italy, the patronal feast of Köniz on 26 June 1513 turned into an uprising under the agitation of mercenaries who had been irregularly recruited to fight against the French. The revolt was directed at members of the Bernese council who were receiving secret French pensions. Three hundred insurgents entered Bern and carried out acts of plunder. The council was forced to make concessions the same evening, and again in the recess of Köniz of 2 July. It promised to prosecute the pension recipients and mercenary leaders, while the rebels would go unpunished.

== Köniz charter ==
The Köniz charter of 28 July further granted the subjects of the bailiwicks the right to be consulted on future alliances with foreign powers, through a consultation of the districts. At the same time, the rural communes succeeded in having their charters of liberties and privileges renewed.

== Bibliography ==
- K. Wimmer, Die Untertanen, der Venner und der Wein: Eine Innenansicht des Könizaufstandes von 1513, unpublished seminar paper, Bern, 1994 (Staatsarchiv Bern).
- E. J. Beer et al. (eds.), Berns grosse Zeit, 1999, pp. 350–353.
