= Augmentation of honour =

Concept in heraldry

In heraldry, an augmentation (often termed augmentation of honour or sometimes augmentation of arms) is a modification or addition to a coat of arms, typically given by a monarch as either a mere mark of favour, or a reward or recognition for some meritorious act. The grants of entire new coats by monarchs as a reward are not augmentations, but rather grants of arms, and (in theory) an augmentation mistakenly given to someone who did not have a right to a coat would be nugatory.

Augmentations could be of any kind: an ordinary, a charge, or a partition of the field. Most often it involves a chief or a canton, which contains a part or the entirety of the arms of the sovereign, which he concedes to a loyal vassal.

Not all modifications to a coat of arms are augmentations of honour. Brisures, for example, are for the cadet lines of the dynasty, which are made by adding a label, bend, bordure, etc.

A common case of augmentations of honour are French cities having in their arms a chief Azure, three fleurs de lys or, also known as the "chief of France", given to cities "faithful" to the king. The new Bourgogne-Franche-Comté region has also granted the right to Rémi Mathis, who has created their new coat of arms, to bear them himself en surtout. Grand Priors of the Order of Saint John of Jerusalem bore augmentations On a chief gules a cross argent, known as a "chief of the Order of Saint John of Jerusalem".

In Scotland the most frequent augmentation is the double tressure flory-counter-flory, the most distinctive feature of the Scottish royal arms, for example as granted (in a somewhat ironic usage) by Henry VIII of England to Thomas Howard, 2nd Duke of Norfolk (an Englishman) after his victory over the Scots at the Battle of Flodden. A more bona fide one was granted by Charles II of England to William Drummond, 1st Viscount Strathallan (c.1617–1688), a Scots nobleman and Royalist during the Civil War. Other forms of Scottish augmentations were granted, for example, to Sir Alexander Campbell, 1st Baronet who received an augmentation "a chief argent charged with a rock proper subscribed Gibraltar, between two medals for Seringapatam and Talavera" commemorating his part in the Great Siege of Gibraltar.

== Examples ==
Thomas Howard, 2nd Duke of Norfolk was given an augmentation (shown to the right) to commemorate the Battle of Flodden.

Thomas Howard's augmentation, a modified version of the Royal coat of arms of Scotland with an arrow through the lion's mouth.

The 1st Duke of Wellington was given an augmentation of the Flag of the United Kingdom in the form of a shield.

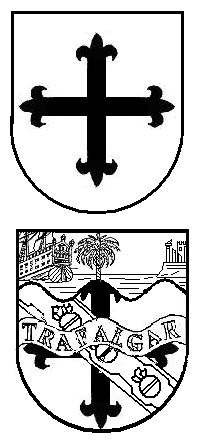
Original family arms of 1st Viscount Nelson and the final version with all his augmentations

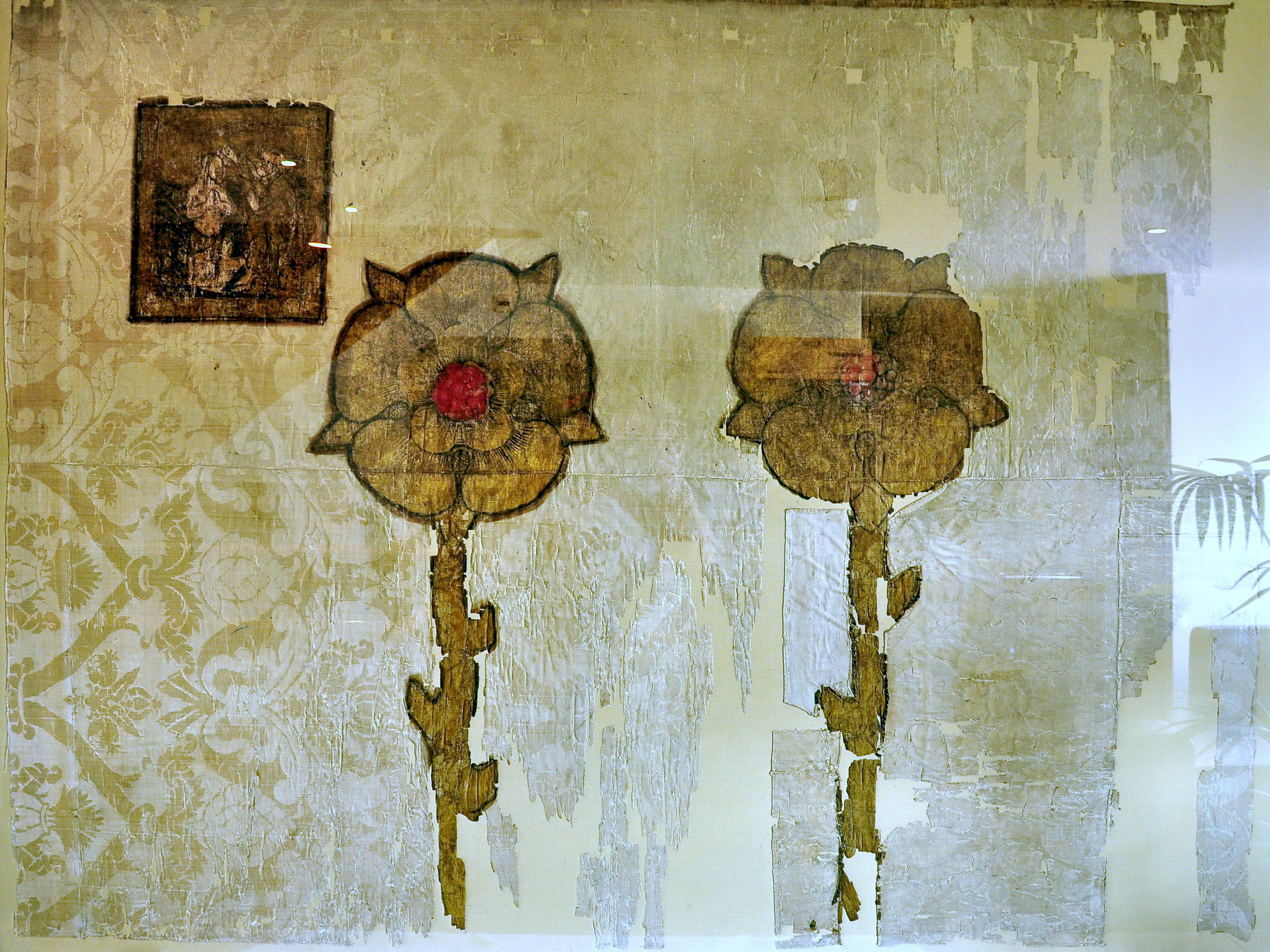
Some of the Juliusbanner given by pope Julius II to the Swiss cantons and their associates included augmentations or "improvements"; shown here is the banner of Rapperswil, with the two roses of the city's coat of arms rendered in gold instead of the usual red.

Emperor Charles V, who was also King of Spain, granted to Juan Sebastián Elcano, the surviving commander of the Ferdinand Magellan expedition that first circumnavigated the world, an augmentation of arms consisting of a world globe with the words Primus circumdedisti me (Latin: "You first encircled me"). Charles V's grandmother Isabella I of Castille added a pomegranate to her coat of arms in honor of the capture of Granada.

The table below provides further examples of augmentations in British heraldry.

Name of grantee	Shield augmentation	Crest augmentation	Supporters augmentation
Mary Abercromby, 1st Baroness Abercromby (in memory of her late husband Lieutenant General Sir Ralph Abercromby KB)	A Fess embattled Gules, out of the embattlements issuant in chief a Dexter Arm embowed in Armour proper, garnished Or, encircled by a Wreath of Laurel, the hand supporting Military Colours in bend Sinister, intended to represent those styled by the French “The Invincible Standard”,	None	None
General Sir David Baird, 1st Bt	On a canton ermine a sword in pale proper.	None	None
Colonel James Stevenson Barnes CB	A chief, thereon the representation of the curtain of a fortification, and above, the word St Sebastian and also a canton, charged with representations of the gold Cross presented by His Majesty's command-to the said James Stevenson Barns and a like badge of the Royal Portuguese Military Order of the Tower and Sword pendent from the ribbands to which the said distinctions are respectively attached.	Issuant from a broken battlement a dexter arm in armour, the-hand grasping a banner, inscribed “St Sebastian”.	None
General Sir George Beckwith	None.	Issuant from a mural crown, an arm embowed, encircled with a wreath of laurel, the hand grasping an eagle or French standard, the staff broken.	None.
Major General Sir Thomas Makdougall Brisbane, 1st Baronet, GCB, GCH, FRS, FRSE	A chief embattled argent thereon on waves of the sea a ship of war under sail between two forts, the guns firing and on the battlements the Dutch flag all proper.	Dexter out of a naval crown or, a dexter arm embowed in the uniform of a captain of the Royal Navy, the band grasping a cutlass ppr. hilted and pomelled or, and from the band pendent by a ribbon ar. fimbriated az. a gold medal.	None
Sir Philip Bowes Vere Broke, 1st Baronet KCB	None	Issuant from a naval crown, a dexter arm embowed, encircled by a wreath of laurel, the hand grasping a trident erect, together with the motto "Scevumque tridentem servarnus".	None
General Sir Robert Brownrigg, 1st Baronet, GCB	A chief, embattled thereon a representation of the sceptre and banner of the King of Kandy in saltire, ensigned with the crown of that Kingdom.	A demi Kandian, holding in the dexter hand a sword, and in the sinister the crown of Kandy.	None
Sir Alexander Burnes, C.B., and Lieut. Charles Burnes	On a chief gules, the White Horse of Hanover between two Eastern crowns or.	Out of a mural crown per pale vert and gules, the colours of the Dourane Empire, the rim inscribed “Cabool" in letters argent, a demi-eagle displayed transfixed by a javelin in bend sinister proper.	None
Field Marshal John Byng, 1st Earl of Strafford GCB, GCH	In bend sinister, a representation of the colour of the 31st regiment of foot.	Out of a mural crown an arm embowed, grasping the colour of the aforesaid 31st regiment, and pendent from the wrist by a ribband the gold cross presented to him.	None
Major-General Sir Neil Campbell CB	On a chief a lion passant guardant, grasping in the dexter paw a sword; and on a canton, pendent from a ribbon, a representation of the badge of the Imperial Russian Military Order of St. George conferred upon the said Sir Neil Campbell by His Majesty the-Emperor of All the Russias.	Out of a mural crown, a demi lion guardant guttee de sang, grasping a sword as in the arms, and gorged, with a ribbon, pendent therefrom a representation of the gold medal conferred upon him for his service at the aforesaid capture of Ciudad Rodrigo and battle of Salamanca.	None
Lieutenant General Sir James Campbell, 1st Baronet GCH	In centre chief point by a ribbon, a representation of the gold cross presented to him, by His Majesty's royal command, for his services in the Peninsula, and a chief, thereon a castle, and over it the word "BADAJOZ", with a canton, charged with an elephant, and the word "ARGAUM".	A demi lion, supporting the colours of the 94th Regiment of Foot.	None
Admiral William Carnegie, 7th Earl of Northesk KCB	Or, an eagle displayed azure, armed and membered sable, and as an honourable augmentation, charged on the breast with a naval crown gold, and over the eagle the word "Trafalgar."	1. The stem of a line-of-battle ship on fire proper. 2. Out of a naval crown or, a demi-leopard proper.	On either side a leopard regardant proper, each holding a banner argent, charged with the Cross of St. George, and thereon inscribed “Britannia Victrix," chains round the necks, from which is suspended on the breast the medal of merit, presented to the Earl of Northesk in remembrance of the victory of Trafalgar.
General John Churchill, 1st Duke of Marlborough KG, PC	In chief an escutcheon argent, charged with the cross of St. George gules, and thereon an escutcheon of the arms of France namely: azure, three fleurs-de-lys or.	None	None
Lieutenant-General Sir Alexander Clark Kennedy KCB KH	On a chief ermine, the eagle and colours of the 105th Regt. and a sword crossed proper, and above them the word "Waterloo".	A demi-man in the uniform of the Royal Dragoons, holding in his dexter hand a sword, and sinister a French eagle all proper.	None.
Admiral Sir Alexander Cochrane GCB	None	Out of a naval crown or, a dexter arm embowed, vested azure, cuffed argent, the hand holding a flagstaff proper, thereon hoisted the flag of a rear-admiral of the white, being argent, a cross gules, and thereon the words "St. Domingo" in letters of gold	None
Captain Sir Christopher Cole KCB	On a bend a scaling ladder, over all a canton thereon, on a mount a castle with five towers inscribed “BELGICA”	As an augmentation to his crest, (being a demi-dragon charged with three annulets) the same issuant from a naval crown, and supporting a flag-staff, thereon hoisted a Dutch ensign; the centre stripe inscribed BANDA, and above an English pendant flying.	None
Vice Admiral Cuthbert Collingwood, 1st Baron Collingwood	A Chief wavy, thereon a Lion passant guardant and navally crowned, with the word "TRAFALGAR"	The Stern of a Man of War, representing that of the Royal Sovereign, between a Branch of Laurel and a Branch of Oak.	None
Field Marshal Stapleton Cotton, 1st Viscount Combermere GCB GCH KSI PC	In chief, pendent from a ribbon gules, a representation of a medal presented to the Viscount, after the battle of Salamanca.	Upon a mount vert, a soldier of the 3rd Regt. Of Light Dragoons, mounted all proper, in the attitude of charging the enemy, and over this crest in a scroll azure, the word "Salamanca" in letters of gold.	None
Sir Bartholomew de Crequi, Lord de la Roche	On a canton or a rose gules.	None	None
Sir John Croft, 1st Baronet, DL, FRS	None	A lion passant guardant per pale indented gules and erminois, the dexter forepaw resting on an escutcheon argent, charged with the Star of the Order of the Tower and Sword.	On the dexter side a lion guardant or, gorged with a wreath of laurel vert, therefrom pendent an escutcheon gules, charged with a tower gold; and on the sinister a bull sable, horned, crined, hoofed, and gorged with a wreath of laurel or, therefrom pendent an escutcheon argent, charged with the Star of the Order of the Tower and Sword proper. Supporters to descend with the Baronetcy per Royal Licence of 15 May 1834.
Thomas Cromwell, 1st Baron Cromwell, 1st Earl of Essex	Party per fess or and gules, a pale counterchanged all charged alternately with six fleurs de lys azure and pelicans with wings close vulning themselves of the first, 3 and 3.	None	None
Lieutenant General Sir Benjamin D'Urban GCB KCH FRS	On a canton gules, a representation of the Military Gold Cross inscribed with the words Busaco, Albuera, Badajos, and Salamanca, pendent from a ribband of the first fimbriated azure, with five gold clasps inscribed with the words Vittoria, Pyrenees, Nivelle, Nive, and Toulouse.	None	None
Sir William Domville, 1st Baronet	Azure, a lion rampant argent, supporting a sword erect representing the sword of the City of London proper, and on a chief of honourable augmentation of the second three Oriental crowns, two and one, the points alternately radiated gold, encircled by two branches of olive also proper.	Out of a mural crown gules, a demi-lion issuant argent, supporting an escutcheon azure charged with three crowns as in the arms	None
Admiral Adam Duncan, 1st Viscount Duncan, KB	A Representation of the Gold Medal conferred upon him by His Majesty upon Occasion of the said Victory, pendant from a blue and white Ribbon, ensigned with a naval Crown, and subscribed "Camperdown".	None	None
George Augustus Eliott, 1st Baron Heathfield, KB, PC	The Arms of Gibraltar, viz. azure, between two pillars, a castle argent, from the gate a golden key pendent and the words "Plus ultra" inscribed thereunder.	None	None
Gilbert Elliot-Murray-Kynynmound, 1st Earl of Minto, PC, FRSE	A chief of augmentation argent, charged with a Moor's head couped in profile proper, being the arms of the Island of Corsica.	None	None
Sir Richard Fanshawe, 1st Baronet PC	Quarter of augmentation: chequy argent and azure, a cross gules.	None	None
Sir Bernard de Gomme	On a canton or a rose gules.	None	None
Field Marshal Hugh Gough, 1st Viscount Gough, KP, GCB, GCSI, PC	In the centre chief point, pendent from a riband argent, fimbriated azure, a representation of the badge of the Spanish Order of Charles III proper, and on a chief a representation of the east wall of the fortress of Tarifa, with a breach between two turrets, and on the dexter turret the British flag flying also proper.	A dexter arm embowed in the uniform of the 87th Regiment, being gules faced vert, the hand grasping the colour of the said regiment displayed, and a representation of a French eagle reversed and depressed, the staff broken proper; in an escroll above the word "Barrosa."	None
Field Marshal Hugh Gough, 1st Viscount Gough, KP, GCB, GCSI, PC	Second augmentation: Gules, on a mount vert a lion passant guardant or, supporting with its dexter paw the union flag proper, and over the same in chief the words "China, India," in letters of gold	Second crest of augmentation: On a mural crown argent, a lion passant guardant or, holding in the dexter paw two flag-staves in bend sinister proper, the one bearing the union flag of Great Britain and Ireland surmounting the other, the staff thereof broken, with a triangular banner flowing therefrom being intended to represent a Chinese flag, having thereon the device of a dragon, in an escroll above the word "China".	None
Sir Theodore Graswincle of Delft.	A chief gules charged with a lion of England.	None	None
Richard Grosvenor, 2nd Marquess of Westminster KG PC	In 1st quarter the arms of the City of Westminster.	None	None
Sir William Withey Gull, 1st Baronet	a canton ermine, thereon an ostrich feather argent, quilled or, enfiled by the coronet from the badge of the Prince of Wales or	A lion passant guardant or, supporting with the dexter paw an escutcheon azure thereon an ostrich feather argent, quilled or, and enfiled by a coronet as in the arms.	None
Sir Henry Halford, 1st Baronet, GCH	On a canton ermine a staff entwined with a serpent proper, and ensigned with a coronet composed of crosses patée and fleurs-de-lis (being that of a prince of the blood-royal).	A staff entwined with a serpent or, as on the canton.	Two emews proper, each gorged with a coronet, composed of crosses patée and fleurs-de-lis.
Lieutenant-General Sir John James Hamilton, 1st Baronet	On a chief a mount inscribed "Alba De Tormes" thereon a castle, and flowing from the embattlements a Spanish flag	On a mount a castle as in the arms.	None
Sir Charles Harbord	In the centre point a royal crown or.	None	None
Captain George Nicholas Hardinge	On a chief wavy of the second, a dismasted French frigate with the French flag flying below the British ensign, towed to the dexter by an English frigate in a shattered state all proper.	A dexter hand holding a sword erect, proper, surmounting a Dutch and a French flag in saltire, on the former inscribed “Atlanta," on the latter "Piedmontaise," the sword enfilcd by a wreath of laurel and also of cypress proper	None
Admiral Sir John Hawkins	On a canton or an escallop between two palmer's staves sable.	A demi-Moor proper bound captive, with annulets on his arms and in his ears.	None
Sir George Hayter	On a canton the Imperial Crown.	None	None
Hereford (city of)	A bordure azure charged with 10 saltires argent	None	None
Sir Thomas Hislop, 1st Baronet, GCB	On a chief of the arms of his family, a mount, there on a lion in the act of capturing the standard of Holkur, and beneath the word MAHIDFOHK	A soldier, of the 22nd Regiment of Light Dragoons, mounted, and in the position of attack.	None
Sir Robert Holmes	To be quartered with his paternal arms, Or three weasels sable: Barry wavy of six or and azure, on a canton gules a lion of England gold.	Out of a naval crown or an armed arm holding a trident azure headed gold.	None
Captain Sir William Hoste, 1st Baronet KCB	In chief a naval crown, pendent there-from by a ribbon a representation of the gold medal given by the Prince Regent to the first Baronet for his distinguished conduct on March 13, 1811, subscribed "Lissa".	Out of a naval crown or, the rim encircled by a branch of laurel proper, a dexter arm embowed, vested in naval uniform, grasping a flagstaff, flowing therefrom a flag inscribed "Cattaro".	None
Thomas Howard, 2nd Duke of Norfolk	Or, a demi-lion rampant pierced through the mouth by an arrow within a double tressure flory counterflory gules.	None	None
Queen Catherine Howard	Azure, three fleurs-de-lis in pale or between two flaunches ermine each charged with a rose gules.	None	None
Queen Catherine Howard	Second augmentation: Azure, two lions passant guardant in pale within a bordure of four demi-fleurs-de-lis issuing from the flanks or.	None	None
Patrick Hume, 1st Earl of Marchmont	An Escutcheon Argent charged with an Orange proper stalked and slipped Vert ensigned with an Imperial Crown proper.	None	None
Lieutenant-General John Keane, 1st Baron Keane of Ghazni, Afghanistan GCB GCH	On a chief a representation of the strong and important fortress of Ghuznee.	On a wreath a representation of the Cabool gate of the said fortress of Ghuznee	None
Field Marshal Horatio Herbert Kitchener, 1st Earl Kitchener	Aver all, as an honourable augmentation, on a pile or, two flagstaffs saltirewise, flowing to the dexter the Union flag of Great Britain and Ireland, and to the sinister a representation of the Egyptian flag, all proper, enfilled by a mural crown gules, the rim inscribed "Khartoum" in letters of gold, and as a further augmentation, a chief argent, thereon, on a pale gules, a lion passant guardant or, between an eagle displayed sable, and on a mount vert an orange-tree fructed proper.	Out of a mural crown or, an elephant's head, supporting with the trunk a sword erect, point upwards, proper, pommel and hilt or.	None
Sir Edward Lake, 1st Baronet	None	A cavalier in complete armour on a horse courant argent, bridle and trappings all proper, in his dexter hand a sword imbrued, holding the bridle in his mouth, the sinister arm hanging down useless; round his body a scarf in bend gules.	None
Sir Francis Henry Laking, 1st Baronet, GCVO, KCB	On a chief gules, a lion of England passant guardant or.	None	On either side a knight in complete armour, visor closed proper, resting the exterior hand on a shield of the arms.
Sir George Lane	A canton charged with a crowned harp.	None	None
John Lane	A canton of the Royal Arms of England.	None	None
Thomas Lane		Out of a Wreath or and azure, a demy-horse strawberry colour, bridled sable, bitted and garnished or, supporting an imperial crown gold.	None
Lieutenant-General Sir James Leith GCB	On a chief, a bastion of a fortification, intended to represent that of San Vicente, the British ensign hoisted on the angle, and the two faces near the salient, angle surmounted each by two scaling ladders.	Out of a mural crown, inscribed with the word "SALAMANCA" a demi lion, reguardant, guttee de sang, in the mouth and sinister paw an eagle or standard, reversed, the staff broken, intended to represent the French standard.	None
Sir Charles Lloyd	A lion of England in fess.	None	None
Sir Godfrey Lloyd	A lion of England in fess	None	None
Captain John London?	Azure semé of anchors a naval crown or, and as crest a sea-lion azure supporting a golden anchor.	None	None
Francis Mansell	Or three maunces sable on a chief gules a lion of England or.	A ship with one mast sable under sail argent flying the flag of St George at the masthead, bow and poop and charged on the stern with three Royal Crowns proper.	None
Charles Vincent Massey PC CH CC CD FRSC	A Canton Azure charged with Our Crest of Canada (On a canton azure, atop a torse of the colours [gules and argent], a lion passant guardant imperially crowned maintaining in its dexter forepaw a maple leaf or).	None	None
Sir Philip Meadowe	A canton charged with a crowned lion of England.	None	None
Lt Colonel Edward Miles	A chief embattled, thereon a representation of the medal and clasp, presented to the said Lieutenant-Colonel, by His Majesties command, for his services in the Peninsula, encircled by two branches of laurel, and a canton charged with the bastion of a fortification super-inscribed SAN SEBASTIAN.	Within the battlements of a ruined fortification a grenadier of the 38th regiment, bearing the colours of His Majesty's said regiment	None
Admiral Sir David Milne GCB FRSE	A chief of honourable augmentation wavy argent, thereon a fortified circular lighthouse, with a red flag flying, flanked on the dexter by a hexagon battery of three tiers of guns, with a like flag flying, and on the sinister by another battery of two tiers of guns connected by a wall with the lighthouse all proper, the whole intended to represent that part of the works defending the town and port of Algiers, to which His Majesty's ship Impregnable, which bore the flag of the rear-admiral, was opposed in the memorable attack on the 27th day of August 1816.	Out of a naval crown or, a dexter cubit arm vested azure, the hand proper, grasping a flagstaff, there from flying the flag of a rear-admiral of the blue, inscribed with the word Impregnable in letters of gold.	Dexter, a figure designed to represent a Christian slave, holding in his dexter hand a passion cross or, and in his sinister hand his fetters broken proper; sinister, a sailor, habited and armed with cutlass and pistols proper, holding in the exterior hand a flagstaff, therefrom flowing towards the dexter a banner azure, in canton the union.
Sir Samuel Morland, 1st Baronet	A lion of England to be borne in the dexter chief.	None	None
Major-General Sir Thomas Munro, 1st Baronet KCB	A representation of the hill-fort of Badamy in India.	None	None
Horatio Nelson, 1st Viscount Nelson	A Chief undulated Argent, thereon Waves of the Sea, from which a Palm Tree issuant, between a disabled Ship, on the Dexter, and a ruinous Battery, on the Sinister, all Proper	On a Naval Crown Or, The Chelengk, or Plume of Triumph, presented to him by the Grand Signior.	In the Hand of the Sailor a Palm Branch, and another in the Paw of the Lion, both Proper, with the Addition of a trl-coloured Flag and Staff in the Mouth of the latter
Colonel Richard Newman	An escutcheon gules charged with a crowned portcullis or.	None	None
Sir Edward Nicholas	Argent on the cross of St. George gules a royal crown or.	None	None
Major General Sir Joseph O'Halloran GCB	None.	Out of an Eastern crown or, an arm in armour proper, garnished gold, the hand in a gauntlet also proper, grasping a flagstaff, therefrom flowing a standard azure, charged with a monkey statant also or, motto over “Purswarrie"	None
Admiral Sir Robert Waller Otway, 1st Baronet, GCB	On a chief azure an anchor between two branches of oak or, and on the dexter side a demi-Neptune and on the sinister a mermaid proper.	None	None
Colonel Sir Richard Page	A canton gules charged with a lion of England.	None	None
Humphry Painter	On a canton or a rose gules.	None	None
Admiral the Hon. Sir Thomas Pakenham GCB	On a chief the sea, and on the stern of an antique ship riding thereon Britannia standing, Victory alighting on the prow and placing a wreath of laurel on Britannia's head all proper, being the device, on the medal emblematic of the glorious sea-fight of June 1, 1794, wherein Capt. the Hon. Thomas Pakenham commanded H.M.S. "Invincible" and captured "Le Juste" one of the enemy's ships.	None	None
Queen Catherine Parr	Argent, on a pile gules between six roses of the second three roses of the field.	None	None
Sir John de Pelham	Gules two pieces of belts palewise in fess argent buckles in chief Or.	None	None
Admiral Edward Pellew, 1st Viscount Exmouth, GCB	On a chief wavy argent, in front of a city intended to represent that of Algiers, a range of batteries flanked on the sinister by a circular fortified castle, with triple battlements proper, thereon two flags displayed, the one barry wavy or and gules (indicative of the presence of the Bey of Algiers, within the said castle), and the other of the last; on the dexter, and abreast of the said batteries, a ship of the line, bearing the flag of an Admiral of the Blue Squadron, moored also proper.	None	None
Granville Penn / William Penn, proprietor of Pennsylvania	On a canton a crown, representing the royal crown of King Charles the Second.	None	None
Sir Edmund Pierce	A canton charged with a fleur de lis.	None	None
Admiral Sir George Pocock or Pococke, KB	On a chief wavy azure a sea-horse between two Eastern crowns with the word "Havana".	None	None
Field Marshal Sir George Pollock, 1st Baronet GCB GCSI		A lion rampant guardant argent, adorned with an Eastern crown or, holding in his dexter paw in bend an Afghan banner displayed gules, bordered or and vert, the staff broken in two, and in his sinister paw a part of the broken staff, and in an escroll over the same this motto "Afghanistan".	Dexter, an heraldic tiger sable, maned, tufted, and gorged with an Eastern crown and chain reflexed over the back or, pendent by a chain from the crown an escutcheon, also or, charged with a bomb fired proper; sinister, a talbot sable, gorged, chained as the dexter, and pendent from the crown a like escutcheon.
Sir Richard Puleston, 1st Baronet	None	An oak-tree proper, pendent therefrom by a riband azure, an escutcheon gules, charged with three ostrich-feathers argent.	None
Richard Pyle	A canton gules charged with a leopard's face or.	None	None
Sir James Reid, 1st Baronet GCVO KCB VD JP	None	None	On either side a royal stag or. gorged with a chain proper, suspended therefrom an escutcheon azure charged with a representation of the Imperial crown also proper.
Sir John Robinson Bt.	Quarterly embattled gules and or, in the first quarter a tower argent and on the battlements thereof a lion statant gardant gold.	None	None
Sir John Ross CB and Sir James Clark Ross DCL FRS FLS FRAS	A chief or, thereon a portion of the terrestrial globe proper, the true meridian described thereon by a line passing from north to south, sable, with the Arctic circle azure, within the place of the magnetic pole in latitude 70 5' 17" and longitude 96 46' 45" west, designated by an inescutcheon gules, charged with a lion passant guardant of the first; the magnetic meridian shown by a line of the fourth passing through the inescutcheon with a correspondent circle, also gules, to denote more particularly the said place of the magnetic pole; the words following inscribed on the chief, viz., “Arctaeos numine fines."	On a rock, a flagstaff erect, thereon hoisted the Union Jack, inscribed with the date June 1, 1831 (being that of discovering the place of the magnetic pole), and at foot, and on the sinister side of the flagstaff, the dipping needle, showing its almost vertical position, all proper.	None
Major-General Robert Ross	Per fess embattled in Chief a dexter Arm embowed and encircled b a Wreath of Laurel the Hand grasping the Colours of the United States of America the Staff broken on a Canton a representation of the Gold Cross with which HIS MAJESTY was pleased to honour the said Major General in testimony of His Royal Approbation of his Services in base the Arms of Ross of Ross Trevor.	Out of a Mural Crown a dexter Arm grasping the Colours as in the Arms.	None
Patrick Ruthven, 1st Earl of Forth and 1st Earl of Brentford	A canton or with a rose gules charged with another argent within the tressure of Scotland.	None	None
John Sayer	An escutcheon charged with a rose crowned.	None	None
Queen Jane Seymour	Or, on a pile gules between six fleurs-de-lys azure three lions passant guardant or.	None	None
Archbishop Gilbert Sheldon	A canton charged with a rose.	None	None
Admiral Sir William Sidney Smith GCB GCTE KmstkSO FRS	On the Chevron a Wreath of Laurel, accompanied by Two Crosses Calvary, and, on a Chief of Augmentation the Interior of an ancient Fortification, in perspective; in the Angle a Breach; and, on the Sides of the said Breach, the Standard of the Ottoman Empire, and the Union Flag of Great Britain, as then-displayed.	The Imperial Ottoman Plume of Triumph, upon a Turban; A Leopard's Head, collared and lined, issuant out of an Oriental Crown.	A Tiger guardant, navally crowned; in the Mouth a Palm Branch, being the Symbol of Victory, supporting the Union Flag of Great Britain, with the Inscription JERUSALEM 1799 upon the Cross of St. George. A Lamb, murally crowned; in the Mouth an Olive Branch, being the Symbol of Peace, supporting the Banner of Jerusalem.
Lt General Sir Lionel Smith, 1st Baronet GCB GCH	None	A representation of the ornamental centre-piece of the service presented to Lt.-Gen. Sir Lionel Smith by his friends at Bombay all proper.	None
Admiral William Henry Smyth KFM DCL FRS FSA FRAS FRGS	A chief argent, thereon a mount vert inscribed with the Greek letters KYPA gold and issuant therefrom a representation of the plant Silphium proper.	A mount vert inscribed with the Aforesaid Greek letters and issuant therefrom the Silphium as in the arms.	None
Captain John Hanning Speke	A chief azure, thereon a representation of flowing water proper, superinscribed with the word "Nile " in letters gold.	A crocodile proper.	None
Sir William Stamford of Rowley Regis	A arm in gauntlet grasping a broken sword	None	None
Dr. Richard Steward	On an escutcheon gules the Royal Crown.	None	None
Sir Alexander Steward "The Fierce"	Argent, a lion rampant gules debruised by a bend raguly or	A sword broken in two, the pieces placed in saltire on a wreath, and surmounting a ragged staff erectly or	None
Abraham Walker of the Hague	A fess gules charged with a lion of England.	None	None
Sir Edward Walker	Argent on the cross of St. George gules five leopards’ faces or.	None	None
Richard Waller	None	Suspend from the crest ("On a mount a walnut-tree proper") an escutcheon of the arms of that Prince Charles viz "Azure, three fleurs-de-lis or, a label of three points argent".	None
Sir John Walpoole	A canton gules charged with a lion of England.	None	None
Arthur Wellesley, 1st Duke of Wellington, KG, GCB, GCH, PC, FRS	In the dexter quarter an escutcheon charged with the crosses of St. George, St. Andrew, and St. Patrick, being the union badge of the United Kingdom of Great Britain and Ireland.	None	None
Mr Whitgreave of Moseley Hall	A chief argent and thereon a rose gules irradiated gold within a wreath of oak proper.	Out of a ducal coronet a sceptre in pale or surmounted by a branch of oak proper and a rose gules slipped in saltire also proper.	None
Sir David Wilkie RA	On a canton the Imperial Crown.	The Imperial Crown between the lion's paws of his crest.	None
Francis Wolfe of Madeley, Salop	A lion of England on an escutcheon.	None	None
Captain Henry Yonger	A canton or with a rose gules charged with another argent.	None	None
