= Onion War =

1513–1515 peasant revolt in Lucerne, Switzerland

The Onion War (German: Zwiebelnkrieg) was a peasant revolt that affected the territory of Lucerne in 1513, with further unrest continuing until 1515. Contemporary with the Köniz uprising in Bern and similar rebellions in Solothurn and Zürich, it was caused by the discontent of the rural subjects with the authorities' mercenary recruitment and pension policy. More broadly, it was a reaction against the intensification of urban lordship over the countryside, which infringed on traditional rights.

== Outbreak and siege ==
The revolt was triggered by rumors of heavy losses suffered by Confederate troops against the French at the Battle of Novara on 6 June 1513, at a time when unscrupulous beneficiaries of pensions in Lucerne—including Petermann Feer and Hans Ratzenhofer—were simultaneously recruiting mercenaries for the French side. Several thousand insurgents marched on Lucerne and besieged it for three days, from 4 to 6 July 1513. In the process they laid waste to the kitchen gardens surrounding the city, which gave the revolt its name.

== Settlement and aftermath ==
The insurgents withdrew after obtaining concessions from the city on questions of communal autonomy, taxation, and foreign policy, and the situation calmed. Sporadic unrest nevertheless continued to flare up in the countryside. The revolts came to an end in January 1515, with the imprisonment of more than fifty insurgents, the execution of the leader Hans Heid, and the flight of Rudolf Mettenberg, who was caught and executed in 1516 for the same offenses.

== Bibliography ==
- K. Messmer, P. Hoppe, Luzerner Patriziat, 1976, pp. 70, 88.
- P. Spettig, Der Zwiebelnkrieg, licentiate thesis, Zurich, 1994.
