= Schachen, Lucerne =

Former municipality, canton of Lucerne

Schachen
- Former municipality
- Location of Schachen
- Location within Switzerland Location within Canton of Lucerne
- Coordinates: 47.036448°N 8.144904°E
- Country: Switzerland
- Canton: Lucerne
- District: Entlebuch
- Municipality: Werthenstein

Population (1888)
  - Total: 715
- Time zone: UTC+01:00 (CET)
  - Summer (DST): UTC+02:00 (CEST)
- ISO 3166 code: CH-LU
- Website: Profile (in German),

Schachen is a former municipality in the canton of Lucerne, Switzerland, now part of the municipality of Werthenstein in the Entlebuch district. The area of scattered farms lies on the right bank of the Kleine Emme, on the old main road toward Bern. Schachen was dissolved as an independent municipality in 1888 because of its heavy poor-relief burden.

== History ==
Schachen is first mentioned in 1509 as Schachen. Its farms, some of which were medieval male fiefs (Mannlehen), passed to Lucerne after 1386 together with the inner office (Inneres Amt) of Wolhusen, and they belonged to the bailiwick (Landvogtei) of Entlebuch until 1798. Schachen was a municipality in the district of Ruswil in 1798–1799, in the district of Schüpfheim in 1799–1803, and in the office (Amt) of Entlebuch from 1803. Ecclesiastically, Schachen has always belonged to the parish of Malters. In 1807 the western part of the municipality, including the farms that had come to the parish of Wolhusen in 1657, was assigned to the newly created parish of Werthenstein.

Near the mouth of the Rümlig (where a footbridge is recorded in 1474), at the junction with the old connecting road to Entlebuch, a small village with an inn (1516) developed. On the Farnbüel, where there had been a bath since 1674, a spa and bathing establishment was built after 1832; it burned down in 1906.

Schachen had 897 inhabitants in 1850 and 715 in 1888. In 1888 it was dissolved as an independent municipality because of its heavy poor-relief burden.

== Bibliography ==
- Die Kunstdenkmäler des Kantons Luzern, new edition, vol. 1, 1987, pp. 357–431
- Die Gemeinde Werthenstein, 1989
