= Pensions (Old Swiss Confederacy) =

Foreign payments to Swiss officials and authorities, c. 1470–1798

Pensions (German: Pensionen; French: pensions) were regular payments made by foreign sovereigns to officials and authorities of the Swiss Confederacy from the late 15th century until the end of the 18th century. Granted either publicly, to the official treasuries of the cantons, or secretly, to individual recipients, they aimed at influencing political decisions and at securing the right to recruit the sought-after Swiss mercenaries for foreign military service.

== Origins and meaning ==
In its original canon-law meaning, a pension was the right granted to a cleric to enjoy the income of a benefice for life or for a limited period without being obliged to provide any service in return. From the mid-15th century onward, the term was used in a secular context for regular, contractually agreed, and official—though often confidentially handled—payments made by a sovereign to lay or clerical recipients, in addition to their ordinary remuneration. In the Confederacy, the first such annual payments appeared in the last third of the 15th century in connection with the alliances against Charles the Bold (Burgundian Wars).

== Political function and controversy ==
Pensions enabled the rise of wealthy notables and military entrepreneurs. "Pension lords" (Pensionenherren), such as the Burgomaster of Zürich Hans Waldmann, acted as unofficial representatives of their foreign patrons and as distributors of the funds received within local systems of patronage. Pensions were contested from the outset—the first attempts to ban them date from the early 1470s. After Waldmann's fall and execution in 1489, the Federal Diet again debated a ban, but this was no more enforceable than later attempts such as the Pensionenbrief of 1503. Official French and Austrian lists name numerous high-ranking representatives of the Confederate cantons as recipients of secret pensions, including several city clerks and chroniclers, among them Petermann Etterlin and Diebold Schilling.

In internal conflicts of the early 16th century—above all the unrest of 1513 in Bern (the Köniz uprising), Solothurn, and Lucerne (the Onion War), in Zürich in 1515, and in the overthrow of the Burgomaster of Basel in 1521—these payments played a central role, with their recipients accused of corruption and treason. Pamphlets and tracts denounced their effects in drastic terms, often using metaphors of prostitution and sexual corruption, and described them as 'poisoned gifts' and 'Judas's wages'. Huldrych Zwingli, in his sermons against mercenary service and pensions between 1521 and 1525, took up these motifs and sharpened them further: the acceptance of pensions, he argued, not only incited disloyalty and treason but also enfeebled the Confederates and rendered them effeminate by encouraging new vices, the luxury of clothing, and idleness. The Reformed cantons issued strict bans, and Zwingli's former supporter Jakob Grebel was executed in Zürich in 1526 on the charge of having accepted pensions.

== Significance in cantonal finances ==
Foreign pensions nevertheless remained an important source of revenue from the 16th to the end of the 18th century, particularly in the Catholic cantons, where they at times accounted for more than half of regular public income. In the Reformed cantons, no public pensions were paid to officeholders; instead, foreign sovereigns granted profitable trade privileges and salt concessions to similar ends. In the 16th and 17th centuries, pensions allowed the cantons to build up financial reserves and to partly dispense with direct taxation.

In the Catholic cantons, pensions became a defining element of political life. By monopolizing their distribution and the related military entrepreneurship and salt concessions, a few families secured centuries-long local dominance: the Zurlauben in Zug, the Reding in Schwyz, and the Schmid in Uri. Questions of the appropriate distribution of pensions and the rivalry between pro-French and anti-French factions in the Catholic cantons were among the most fiercely debated domestic political issues from the 16th to the 18th centuries. Up to the beginning of the 18th century, alongside France, Spain, Venice, Savoy, and Milan were also important paymasters. After 1710, only French pensions are documented, and the French alliance was renewed for the last time in 1777.

== Historiography ==
Pensions illustrate not only the oligarchical character of the Confederacy under the Ancien Régime and the importance of clientelist and patronage relations, but also the integration of supposedly "closed" Alpine regions into the international military and financial transactions of the early modern period. The contradiction between the pension system and the historical self-image of modern Switzerland in the 19th and early 20th centuries, combined with motifs from older confessional polemics, markedly influenced and distorted the depiction of the Confederacy in historiography until the second half of the 20th century.

== Bibliography ==
- R. Bolzern, Spanien, Mailand und die katholische Eidgenossenschaft, 1982.
- H. Braun, "Heimliche Pensionen und verbotener Reislauf", in Personen der Geschichte, Geschichte der Personen, ed. C. Hesse et al., 2003, pp. 25–42.
- V. Groebner, Gefährliche Geschenke, 2000.
- U. Kaelin, "Salz, Sold und Pensionen", in Geschichtsfreund, 149, 1996, pp. 105–124.
- M. Körner, Solidarités financières suisses au XVIe siècle, 1980.
- K. Messmer, P. Hoppe, Luzerner Patriziat, 1976.
- P. Rogger, Geld, Krieg und Macht, 2015.
- C. Windler, "'Ohne Geld keine Schweizer'", in Zeitschrift für historische Forschung, supplement 36, 2005, pp. 105–133.
