= Swiss National Exhibition =

Periodic national exhibition showcasing Swiss culture, industry, and innovation

The Swiss National Exhibition is a periodically held national event showcasing Switzerland.

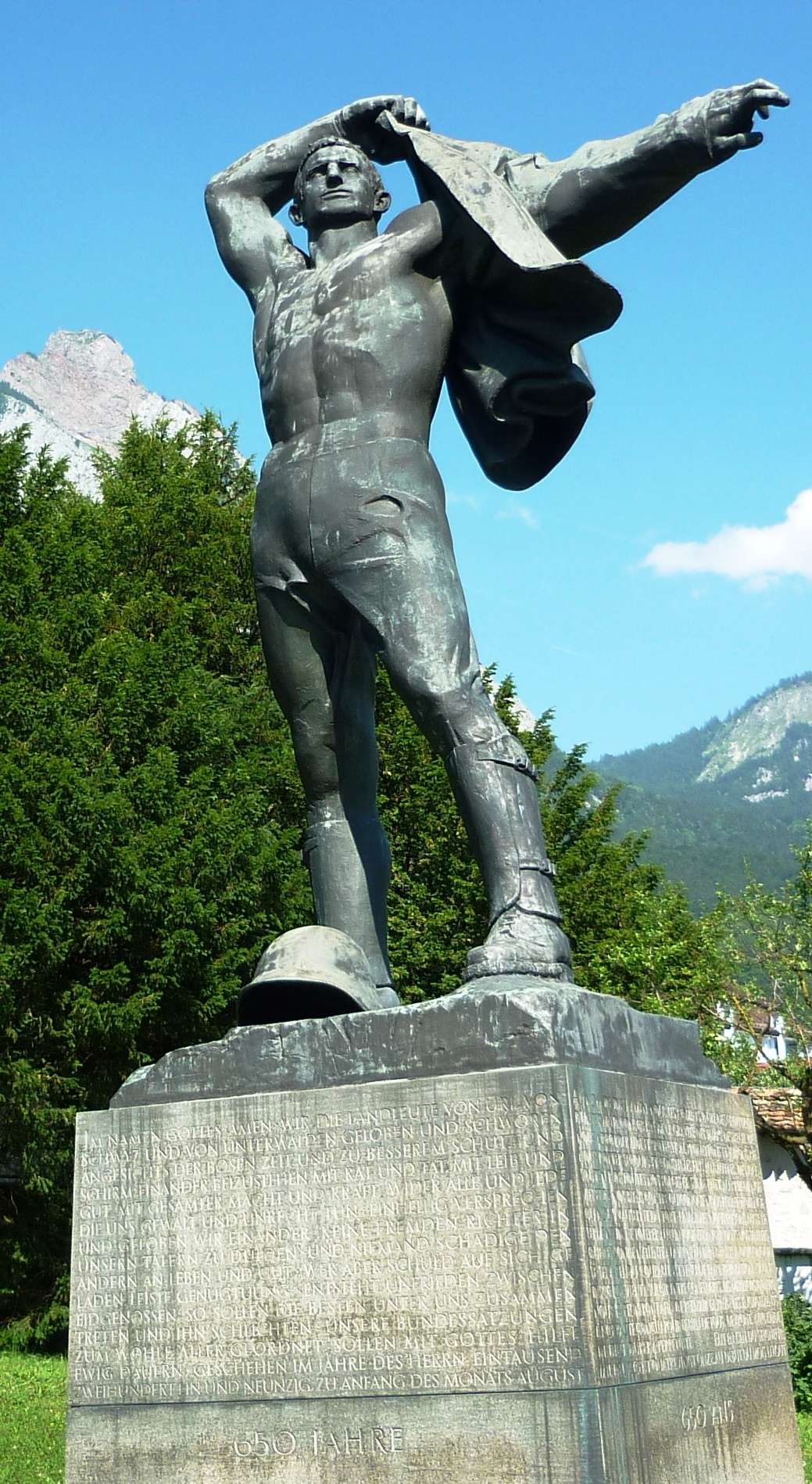
Bronze sculpture Wehrbereitschaft by Hans Brandenberger, symbol of the 1939 national spirit, now in the park of the Federal Archives in Schwyz

== History ==
In Europe, exhibitions emerged in the late 18th century. Unlike fairs and markets, they served only partially commercial purposes. Following early art exhibitions in England and France, the Exposition des produits de l’industrie française in 1798 marked Europe's first major industrial exhibition, showcasing the achievements of the French First Republic.

In Switzerland, the first art and industrial exhibition took place in 1804, with 399 exhibitors from multiple cantons. These events were repeated in 1810, 1818, 1824, and 1830. The 1824 exhibition catalog explicitly stated that no items could be sold in the exhibition hall, nor could goods be produced specifically for the event. These exhibitions coincided with the summer sessions of the Tagsatzung.

In 1843, St. Gallen hosted the first Swiss Trade and Industrial Exhibition, repeated in Bern in 1848 and 1857.

The 1857 Swiss Trade and Industrial Exhibition in Bern is considered Switzerland's first national exhibition, as federal subsidies and the Federal Council's presidency of the exhibition committee gave it an official character. However, it remained primarily a showcase for companies competing for sales-boosting awards. Exhibits promoting ideological values, typical of later national exhibitions, were still absent. Officially, the 1883 exhibition is recognized as the first Swiss National Exhibition, though some sources refer to it as the third or fourth.

== Swiss National Exhibitions ==
=== 1883 in Zürich ===
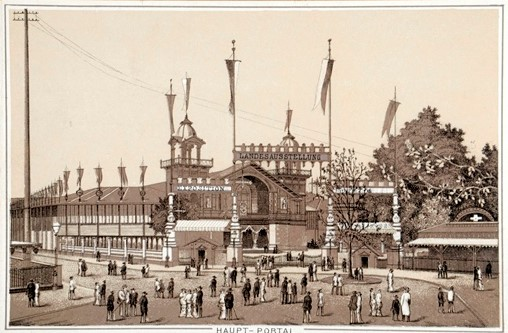
Main entrance and industrial hall of the 1883 National Exhibition, on the site of today's Swiss National Museum

In 1883, Zürich hosted the officially recognized first Swiss National Exhibition, attracting 1.7 million visitors and surpassing all prior federal or cantonal events. The focus expanded beyond art, trade, industry, and agriculture to include ideological values. Significant space was dedicated to education to promote acceptance of compulsory schooling in rural areas. A highlight was the presentation of the Topographic Map of Switzerland.

=== 1896 in Geneva ===
The next exhibition took place in 1896 in Geneva. For the first time, a pavilion from the Department of Defence showcased the Swiss Armed Forces to the public, achieving its goal. From September 8 to 12, the first Swiss Congress for Women's Interests was held. Additionally, alongside the village suisse, a village noir featured mud huts and 230 Sudanese individuals. The automobile was also introduced in Switzerland for the first time. The exhibition's machine hall was repurposed as a coking hall at the Gaswerk Schlieren from 1898 and remains preserved.

=== 1914 in Bern ===
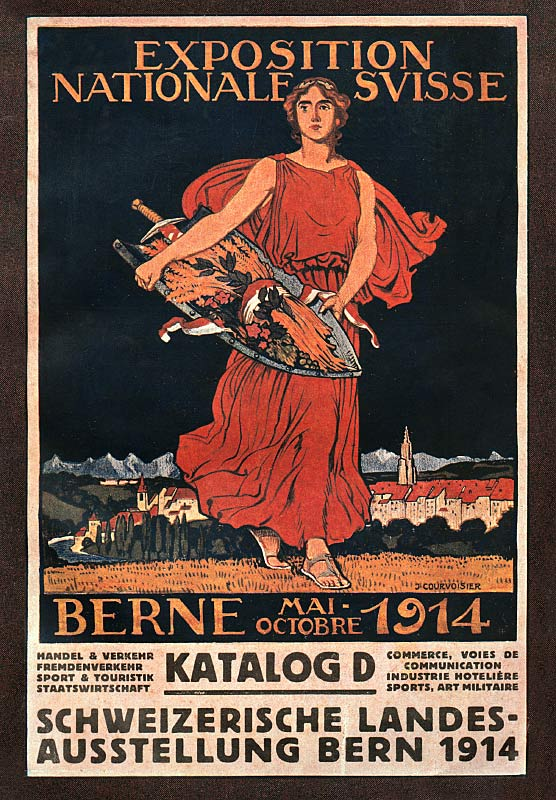
Catalog for the 1914 National Exhibition in Bern

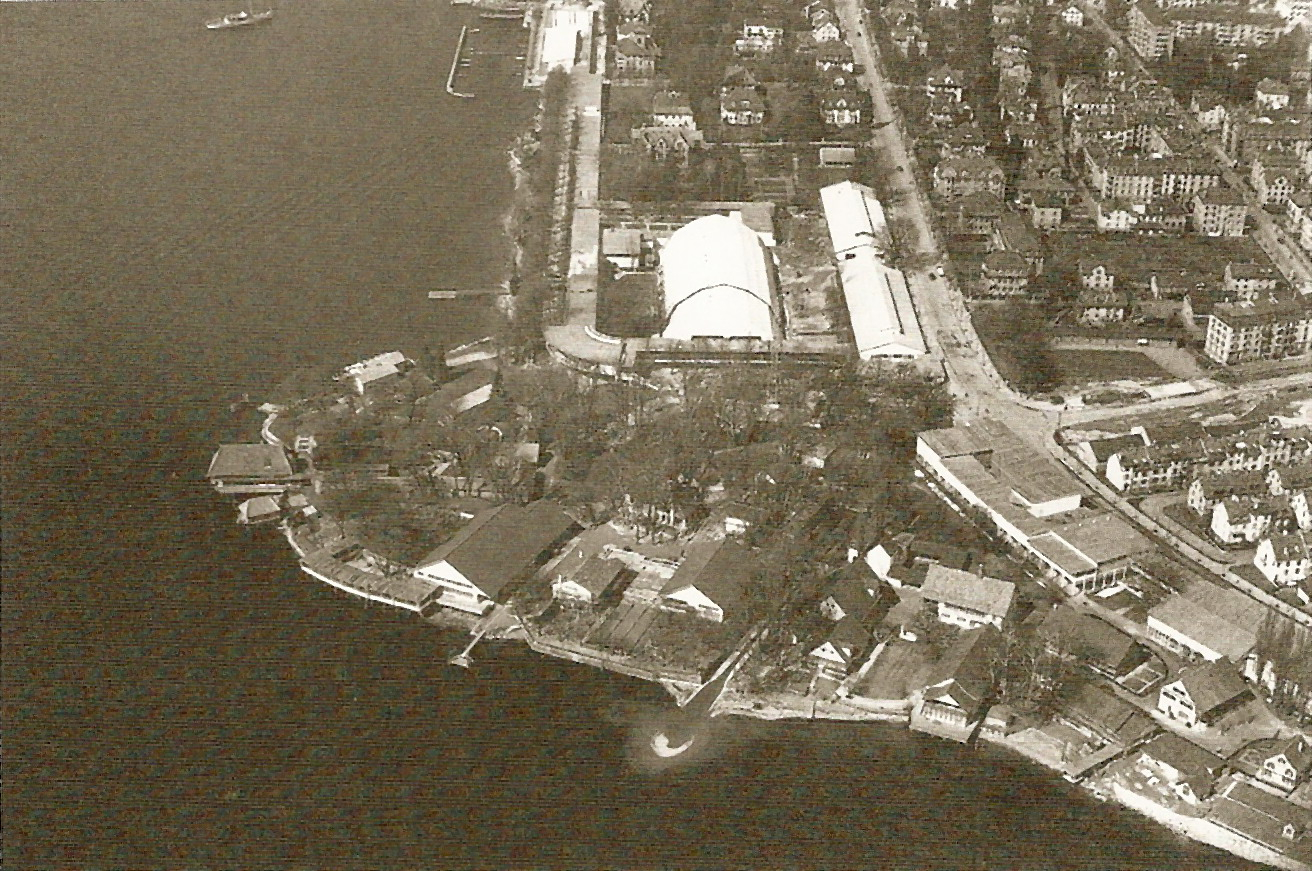
The Landidörfli of 1939 at Zürichhorn, aerial photograph by Walter Mittelholzer

In 1914, Bern hosted an exhibition that coincided with the outbreak of World War I. The army pavilion emphasized Switzerland's commitment to armed neutrality. A model village, the Dörfli, was constructed in Bern's Länggasse district based on architect Karl Indermühle's plans. One exhibit, the Dammahütte of the Swiss Alpine Club, remains preserved at its new location.

=== 1939 in Zürich (Landi) ===
The 1939 exhibition, known as the Landi, took place in Zürich from May 6 to October 29, emphasizing national unity. Attractions included:

- The Landidörfli, showcasing traditional-style houses from various cantons
- The Schifflibach, where visitors traveled through the grounds in small boats
- A cable car crossing Lake Zürich at 75 meters

Led by Armin Meili, the event sold over 10 million tickets.

The Swiss Armed Forces pavilion and Hans Brandenberger's Wehrbereitschaft sculpture reflected the era's focus on defense, amid World War II's outbreak on September 1, 1939. Modern elements included an aluminum industry pavilion, early television demonstrations by Franz Tank, and Hans Coray's Landi-Stuhl, later featured on a 2004 Swiss Post stamp. The pavilion designs, known as Landistil, influenced Swiss architecture.

A "Swiss Women’s Pavilion" by women's organizations showcased contributions to the economy and addressed political inequalities.

=== 1964 in Lausanne (Expo) ===
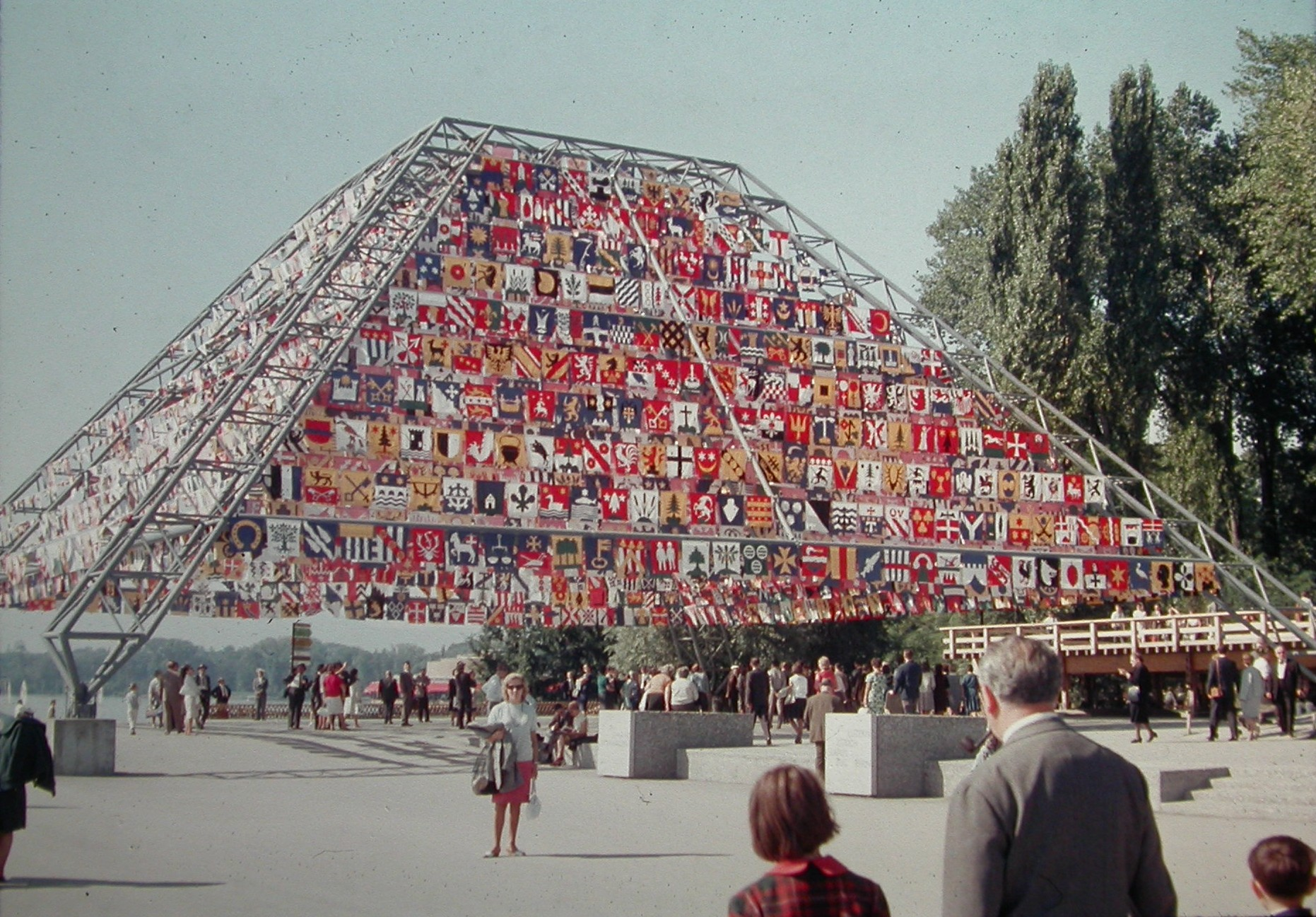
Swiss municipal coats of arms at Expo 64

From April 30 to October 25, 1964, the Lausanne Expo highlighted modern Switzerland with a monorail and cableway. It sold 10 million tickets.

The Swiss Army's Igel-Pavillon reflected Cold War defense strategies. A submarine ride in Auguste Piccard's Mesoscaphe explored Lake Geneva. The Switzerland in the Mirror project showed five films on Swiss life, and the Path of Switzerland displayed flags of all 3,000 Swiss municipalities.

=== Failed 1991 Exhibition in Central Switzerland (CH91) ===
Plans for a 1991 exhibition to mark the 700th Anniversary of the Swiss Confederation in Central Switzerland failed in 1985 after voters in the Canton of Lucerne rejected it. A decentralized concept for other central Swiss cantons (Obwalden, Nidwalden, Schwyz, Zug, and Uri) also lacked support, with funding rejected in April 1987. Instead, the national research exhibition Heureka was held in Zürich.

=== 2002 in Biel/Bienne, Neuchâtel, Yverdon-les-Bains, and Murten (Expo.02) ===
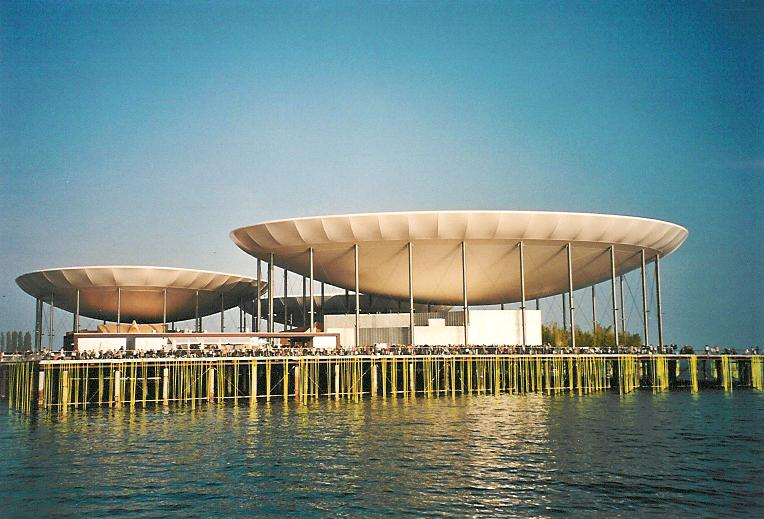
Expo.02: The three pebbles at the Neuchâtel Arteplage

Originally planned for 2001 (Expo.01), the exhibition was postponed to 2002 due to planning difficulties and budget overruns. Held from May 15 to October 20, 2002, across four sites in three lakes and two linguistic regions, Expo.02 was organized by five cantons. It attracted over 10 million visitors with 40 exhibitions, 13,000 cultural performances, and numerous art projects across four Arteplages and the floating Mobile du Jura Arteplage.

=== Projects after Expo.02 ===
Failed Gottardo 2020 Exhibition

To mark the Gotthard Base Tunnel's opening, the Gottardo 2020 exhibition was planned for 2018 in Uri, Ticino, Grisons, and Valais. Themes like environmental protection, energy, culture, and mobility were to be showcased in Lucerne, Bellinzona, Chur, and Brig, with main events at the tunnel portals in Erstfeld and Biasca. The "Alpine Expo" was abandoned due to financing issues and time constraints.

Failed 2027 Exhibition in Eastern Switzerland

Plans for a 2027 exhibition in Appenzell Ausserrhoden, St. Gallen, and Thurgau began in 2014 - 2015. A concept competition selected Expedition27: Three Landscapes. Two Worlds. One Adventure in December 2014. Voters in Thurgau and St. Gallen rejected funding on June 5, 2016.

=== Potential Future Exhibitions ===
Several projects for future Swiss National Exhibitions have been proposed.

Muntagna
AlpenExpo 2027+

The Muntagna association aims to host an Alpine-focused exhibition starting in 2027, promoting sustainable development in the Alps across Romansh, Italian, and Central Swiss regions. It emphasizes new work, lifestyle, leisure, economic, and mobility models.

X-27 in Dübendorf

The X-27 initiative, organized as a private association, seeks to promote civic and public projects culminating in a 2027 event at the Swiss Innovation Park on the Dübendorf Air Base. Projects would begin before and continue after the event.

NEXPO

In 2017, ten Swiss cities agreed on a decentralized exhibition planned for 2030 at the earliest. The "NEXPO – the new Expo" association was founded in 2018. By 2023, 26 cities and municipalities supported NEXPO, but federal funding delays pushed the event to 2032.

Svizra 2027 in Northwestern Switzerland

The "Svizra 27" initiative, initially planned for 2027, aims to host an exhibition in Northwestern Switzerland focusing on work, volunteering, and social media. Ten sites would each cover themes like "security and resilience", "energy and resources", or "nutrition and environment".

==== First Cooperation in 2022 ====
In autumn 2022, NEXPO and X-27 agreed to collaborate on content and communication, prompted by federal pressure after the Federal Council, in summer 2022, expressed openness to a national exhibition with potential financial and ideological support. A framework report was planned by the end of 2023.

==== Federal Delay in 2023 ====
In spring 2023, the federal government halted plans, stating no exhibition with federal involvement would occur before 2030, with funding decisions deferred until 2028.
