= Data codes for Switzerland =

These are data codes for Switzerland.

== Country ==
These are codes for the country itself. See country code for a fuller explanation.

CH
ISO country code (ISO 3166-1 alpha-2, two letter)
Internet Country code top-level domain (ccTLD) (see .ch)
Distinguishing sign of vehicles in international traffic
International Union of Railways alphabetical UIC Country Code
WIPO ST.3
CHE
ISO country code (ISO 3166-1 alpha-3, three letter code)

EO39
Nomenclature of Territorial Units for Statistics (NUTS)
HB
ICAO aircraft registration prefix (since 1935, before: CH)
HBA-HBZ,
HEA-HEZ
ITU callsign prefix
LS
ICAO airport code or nationality letters for location indicator
(see also: List of airport codes: LS)
SUI
IOC country code
FIFA country code
ITU letter codes for member-countries
SW
WMO message header country code
SZ
FIPS country code
Library of Congress machine-readable cataloguing country code

41
Country calling code
85
International Union of Railways numeric UIC Country Code
228
E.212 Mobile country code
269
ITU maritime identification digits
756
ISO country code (ISO 3166-1 numeric, numeric code). Swiss social security numbers begin with 756 and are a valid EAN-13 code.
760-769
GS1 prefix of GTIN (barcodes) by GS1 Switzerland

ШВА
Cyrillic three-letter country codes per GOST 7.67 or ISO 3166-88 standard

== NUTS-2 regions ==
As a member of the EFTA, Switzerland is included in the Nomenclature of Territorial Units for Statistics (NUTS). The three NUTS levels are:

- NUTS-1: Switzerland (CH0)
- NUTS-2: 7 Regions
- NUTS-3: 26 Cantons

The seven NUTS-2 regions are the following:

Code	Region	Region (local name)	Cantons
CH01	Lake Geneva region	Région lémanique	Vaud, Valais, Geneva
CH02	Espace Mittelland	Espace Mittelland	Bern, Fribourg, Solothurn, Neuchâtel, Jura
CH03	Northwestern Switzerland	Nordwestschweiz	Basel-City, Basel-Country, Aargau
CH04	Zurich	Zürich	Zurich
CH05	Eastern Switzerland	Ostschweiz	Glarus, Schaffhausen, Appenzell Ausserrhoden, Appenzell Innerrhoden, St. Gallen, Grisons, Thurgau
CH06	Central Switzerland	Zentralschweiz	Lucerne, Uri, Schwyz, Obwalden, Nidwalden, Zug
CH07	Ticino	Ticino	Ticino

Below the NUTS levels, there are two LAU levels (LAU-1: districts; LAU-2: municipalities).

== Cantons ==

The two-letter abbreviations are widely used, e.g. on car license plates and as disambiguator for localities on postal addresses if two localities in different cantons have the same name. They are also used with the prefix "CH-" as ISO 3166-2 codes of Switzerland, e.g. CH-SZ for the canton of Schwyz.

SFSO also uses a numerical code ordering the cantons by their constitutional order (1 to 26).

The FIPS 10-4 region codes of Switzerland were used by the United States government. This standard was withdrawn in 2008.

The NUTS-3 codes are used by the European Union.

Data codes for Cantons of Switzerland
Canton	Two-letter Abbr.	Numeric	FIPS 10-4	NUTS-3
Aargau	AG	19	SZ01	CH033
Appenzell Innerrhoden	AI	15	SZ10	CH054
Appenzell Ausserrhoden	AR	16	SZ02	CH053
Bern	BE	2	SZ05	CH021
Basel-Landschaft	BL	13	SZ03	CH032
Basel-Stadt	BS	12	SZ04	CH031
Fribourg	FR	10	SZ06	CH022
Geneva	GE	25	SZ07	CH013
Glarus	GL	8	SZ08	CH051
Grisons	GR	18	SZ09	CH056
Jura	JU	26	SZ26	CH025
Lucerne	LU	3	SZ11	CH061
Neuchâtel	NE	24	SZ12	CH024
Nidwalden	NW	7	SZ13	CH065
Obwalden	OW	6	SZ14	CH064
St. Gallen	SG	17	SZ15	CH055
Schaffhausen	SH	14	SZ16	CH052
Solothurn	SO	11	SZ18	CH023
Schwyz	SZ	5	SZ17	CH063
Thurgau	TG	20	SZ19	CH057
Ticino	TI	21	SZ20	CH070
Uri	UR	4	SZ21	CH062
Vaud	VD	22	SZ23	CH011
Valais	VS	23	SZ22	CH012
Zug	ZG	9	SZ24	CH066
Zürich	ZH	1	SZ25	CH040

== Districts ==
Districts are assigned three-digit numerical codes by SFSO.

Districts are used as LAU-1 level.

== Municipalities ==
See Community Identification Number#Switzerland

Municipalities are used as LAU-2 level.

== Localities ==
See Postal codes in Switzerland and Liechtenstein

== Airports ==
See

- List of airports by ICAO code: L#LS – Switzerland and Liechtenstein
- List of airports in Switzerland
