= Central Switzerland =

Coordinates: 47°N 8.5°E

Central Switzerland Zentralschweiz
- Region
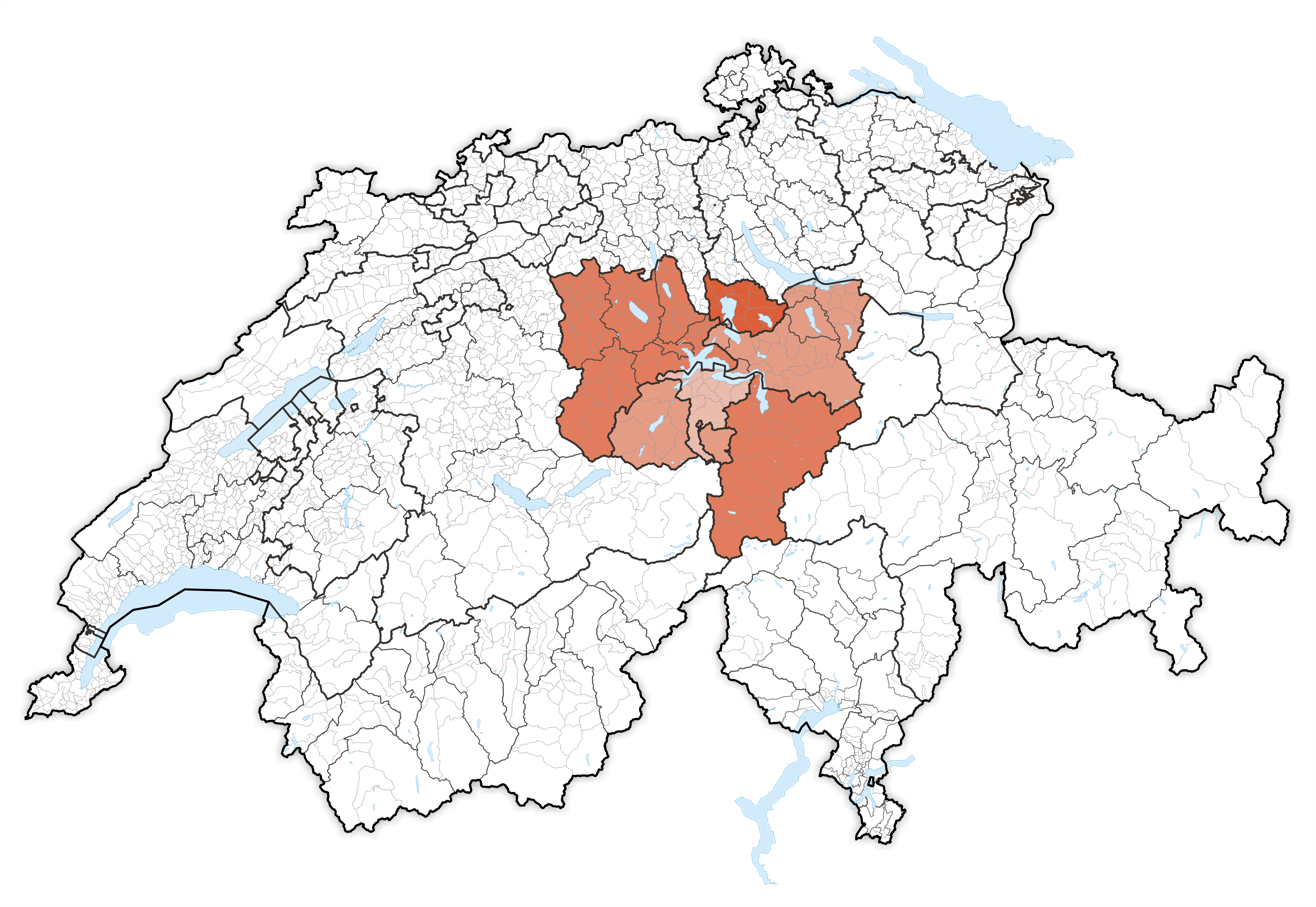
- Country: Switzerland

Area
  - Total: 4,483.3 km^{2} (1,731.0 sq mi)

Population (2007)
  - Total: 718,400
  - Density: 160.2/km^{2} (415.0/sq mi)

GDP
  - Total: CHF 77.093 billion (2022)
- NUTS code: CH06
- HDI (2022): 0.961 very high · 5th

Central Switzerland is a subdivision of Switzerland as defined by the Federal Statistical Office for statistical purposes. It is classified as a NUTS-2 statistical region of Switzerland, and encompasses the cantons of Uri, Schwyz, Obwalden, Nidwalden, Lucerne and Zug. It incorporates the highlands in the central portion of the country.

== Sub-division ==
The country of Switzerland is federally organized into 26 cantons, which are the primary sub-divisions of the country. For statistical purposes, the Federal Statistical Office organizes the country into broader level sub-divisions based on cardinal directions. These are classified as a NUTS-2 statistical regions of Switzerland, and incorporate various cantons within it. It encompasses the cantons of Lucerne, Uri, Schwyz, Obwalden, Nidwalden, Zug.

== Geography ==
Central Switzerland consists of the areas located towards the heart of the country, and borders all the other regions. It borders Lake Geneva region to the southwest, Espace Mittelland to the west, Northwestern Switzerland and Zurich to the north, Eastern Switzerland to the east, and Ticino to the south. The region encompasses an area of 4,483.3 km^{2} (1,731.0 sq mi), and had a population of 718,400 inhabitants.

Central Switzerland incorporates the highlands in the central portion of the country. It is flanked by the Jura and Rhine rivers in the north, and Lake Geneva and the Alps in the south. The topography consists of hills interspersed with valleys and grasslands. Agriculture is more intensively practiced in this region of the country. Central Switzerland is densely populated, with major urban agglomerations spread across the region.

== See also ==
- Cantons of Switzerland
- Waldstätte

Media related to Zentralschweiz at Wikimedia Commons
