= NUTS statistical regions of Switzerland =

Overview about the NUTS statistical regions of Switzerland

The Nomenclature of Territorial Units for Statistics (NUTS) is a geocode standard for referencing the subdivisions of Switzerland for statistical purposes. As a member of EFTA Switzerland is included in the NUTS standard, although the standard is developed and regulated by the European Union, an organization that Switzerland does not belong to. The NUTS standard is instrumental in delivering the European Union's Structural Funds. The NUTS code for Switzerland is CH and a hierarchy of three levels is established by Eurostat. Below these is a further levels of geographic organisation - the local administrative unit (LAU). In Switzerland, the LAUs are municipalities.

== Overall ==
The three NUTS levels are:

Level	Subdivisions	#
NUTS-1	Entire Country	1
NUTS-2	Regions	7
NUTS-3	Cantons	26

== NUTS codes ==
The NUTS codes are as follows:

Diagram of the National (NUTS-1) and Regional (NUTS-2) borders of Switzerland
NUTS 1	Code	NUTS 2	Code	NUTS 3	Code
Switzerland	CH0	Lake Geneva region	CH01	Vaud	CH011
Switzerland	CH0	Lake Geneva region	CH01	Valais	CH012
Switzerland	CH0	Lake Geneva region	CH01	Geneva	CH013
Switzerland	CH0	Espace Mittelland	CH02	Berne	CH021
Switzerland	CH0	Espace Mittelland	CH02	Fribourg	CH022
Switzerland	CH0	Espace Mittelland	CH02	Solothurn	CH023
Switzerland	CH0	Espace Mittelland	CH02	Neuchâtel	CH024
Switzerland	CH0	Espace Mittelland	CH02	Jura	CH025
Switzerland	CH0	Northwestern Switzerland	CH03	Basel-Stadt	CH031
Switzerland	CH0	Northwestern Switzerland	CH03	Basel-Landschaft	CH032
Switzerland	CH0	Northwestern Switzerland	CH03	Aargau	CH033
Switzerland	CH0	Zurich	CH04	Zürich	CH040
Switzerland	CH0	Eastern Switzerland	CH05	Glarus	CH051
Switzerland	CH0	Eastern Switzerland	CH05	Schaffhausen	CH052
Switzerland	CH0	Eastern Switzerland	CH05	Appenzell Ausserrhoden	CH053
Switzerland	CH0	Eastern Switzerland	CH05	Appenzell Innerrhoden	CH054
Switzerland	CH0	Eastern Switzerland	CH05	St. Gallen	CH055
Switzerland	CH0	Eastern Switzerland	CH05	Grisons	CH056
Switzerland	CH0	Eastern Switzerland	CH05	Thurgau	CH057
Switzerland	CH0	Central Switzerland	CH06	Lucerne	CH061
Switzerland	CH0	Central Switzerland	CH06	Uri	CH062
Switzerland	CH0	Central Switzerland	CH06	Schwyz	CH063
Switzerland	CH0	Central Switzerland	CH06	Obwalden	CH064
Switzerland	CH0	Central Switzerland	CH06	Nidwalden	CH065
Switzerland	CH0	Central Switzerland	CH06	Zug	CH066
Switzerland	CH0	Ticino	CH07	Ticino	CH070

== Local Administrative Units ==
Below the NUTS levels, there are Local Administrative Units (LAU)

== See also ==
- Subdivisions of Switzerland
- ISO 3166-2 codes of Switzerland
- FIPS region codes of Switzerland
- Comparison of ISO, FIPS, and NUTS codes of the cantons of Switzerland
- List of regions of Switzerland by Human Development Index
