= Subdivisions of Switzerland =

The Swiss Confederation comprises the 26 cantons of Switzerland.

Each canton has its individual structure for further subdivisions.

== Regions ==
For statistical purposes, Switzerland is subdivided into seven regions at the NUTS-2 level:

Eastern Switzerland:	Cantons of St. Gallen, Thurgau, Appenzell Innerrhoden, Appenzell Ausserrhoden, Glarus, Schaffhausen, Graubünden
Zürich:	Canton of Zürich
Central Switzerland:	Cantons of Uri, Schwyz, Obwalden, Nidwalden, Lucerne, Zug
Northwestern Switzerland:	Cantons of Basel-Stadt, Basel-Landschaft, Aargau
Espace Mittelland:	Cantons of Bern, Solothurn, Fribourg, Neuchatel, Jura
Région lémanique:	Cantons of Geneva, Vaud, Valais
Ticino:	Canton of Ticino

== Cantons ==

The 26 cantons of Switzerland are the member states of the federal state of Switzerland. Each canton except for Aargau, Jura, Thurgau, Ticino, Vaud, and Valais was a fully sovereign state with its own borders, army and currency from the Treaty of Westphalia (1648) until the establishment of the Helvetic Republic in 1798. The current cantons except for Jura were established with the Swiss federal state in 1848.

Each canton has its own constitution, legislature, government and courts. Most of the cantons' legislatures are unicameral parliaments, their size varying between fifty-eight and two hundred seats. A few legislatures are general assemblies known as Landsgemeinden. The cantonal governments consist of either five or seven members, depending on the canton. For the names of the institutions, see List of legislative and executive councils of the Cantons of Switzerland.

The Swiss Federal Constitution declares the cantons to be sovereign to the extent their sovereignty is not limited by federal law. The cantons also retain all powers and competencies not delegated to the Confederation by the Constitution. Most significantly, the cantons are responsible for healthcare, welfare, law enforcement and public education; they also retain the power of taxation. The cantonal constitutions determine the degree of autonomy accorded to the municipalities, which varies but almost always includes the power to levy taxes and pass municipal laws. The sizes of the cantons vary from 37 km² to 7,105 km²; the populations vary from 16,000 (Appenzell Innerrhoden) to 1,600,000 (Zurich).

== Districts ==
In contrast to centrally organised states, in the federally constituted Switzerland each Canton is completely free to decide its own internal organisation. Therefore, there exists a variety of structures and terminology for the subnational entities between Canton and Municipality, loosely termed districts (i.e. Urban Administration Districts).

Most Cantons are divided into Bezirke (German for districts). They are also termed Ämter (Lucerne), Amtsbezirke (Bern), district (in French) or distretto (Ticino and part of Graubünden). The Bezirke generally provide only administration and court organization. However, for historical reasons districts in cantons Graubünden and Schwyz are their own legal entities with jurisdiction over tax and often have their own Landsgemeinde.

Eight of the 26 Cantons – Uri, Obwalden, Nidwalden, Glarus, Zug, Appenzell Innerrhoden, Basel-City and Geneva – have always existed without the district level of government.

A number of further cantons have dispensed with the district level recently, Appenzell Ausserrhoden in 1995, Schaffhausen in 1999, St Gallen in 2003 and Lucerne in 2007.

A number of further cantons are considering (or have already decided) an abolition of the district level in the future: Schwyz in 2006 voted on its abolition, but voted in favour of keeping the division. Bern in 2006 decided a reduction of its 26 districts to five administrative regions. Vaud decided a reduction from 19 to 10 districts. Valais is planning a similar reduction and in Thurgau, a reduction of eight to four districts is under discussion.

== Municipalities ==
Communes (German: Gemeinden / French: communes / Italian: comuni / Romansh: vischnancas), also known as municipalities, are the smallest government division in Switzerland, numbering 2110 as of 2026. While many have a population of a few hundred citizens, the largest cities such as Zürich or Geneva also have the legal status of municipalities. The area of the municipalities varies between 0.32 km² (Rivaz, Vaud) and 439 km² (Scuol, Graubünden).

Each canton defines their responsibilities. These may include providing local government services such as education, medical and social services, public transportation, and tax collection. The degree of centralization varies from one canton to another.

Communes are generally governed by a council (sometimes called Municipality) headed by a mayor as executive and the town meeting as legislature. Most cantons leave the option to larger municipalities to opt for a city parliament. In some cantons, foreign persons that have dwelled for a certain time in Switzerland are also allowed to participate in the municipal politics.

Swiss citizenship is based on the citizenship of a municipality. Every Swiss is citizen of one or several municipalities (i.e. the place of origin, lieu d'origine, Heimatort).

Communes are financed through direct taxes (e.g. income tax), with rates varying more or less within a framework set by the canton.

Many municipalities are having difficulties maintaining the civil services they need to perform the duties they are required to do. In an effort to reduce expenses, many municipalities are combining (through mergers or the creation of special-purpose districts). This restructuring is generally encouraged by the cantonal governments and the rate of these unions is increasing.

"Cities" (villes or Städte) are the municipalities with more than 10,000 inhabitants or smaller places which had medieval town rights. There is no specific designation for smaller communities such as "village" or "town".

== Other subdivisions ==
Some subdivisions that exist are:

- Region
  - German: Verwaltungsregionen (e.g. Subdivisions of the canton of Bern)
- Electoral district
  - German: Amtei (e.g. Subdivisions of the canton of Solothurn)
- Constituencies
  - German: Wahlkreis (e.g. Subdivisions of the canton of St. Gallen)
- Sub-district or circle
  - German: Kreis (e.g. Graubünden)
  - Italian: Circolo (e.g. Ticino)
  - French: Cercle (e.g. Subdivisions of the canton of Vaud)

== See also ==
- List of former municipalities of Switzerland
- Spatial planning in Switzerland
