= ISO 3166-2:CH =

Entry for Switzerland in ISO 3166-2

ISO 3166-2:CH is the entry for Switzerland in ISO 3166-2, part of the ISO 3166 standard published by the International Organization for Standardization (ISO), which defines codes for the names of the principal subdivisions (e.g., provinces or states) of all countries coded in ISO 3166-1.

The abbreviation is derived from Latin name for Switzerland, Confoederatio Helvetica ("Helvetic Confederation").

Currently for Switzerland, ISO 3166-2 codes are defined for 26 cantons.

Each code consists of two parts, separated by a hyphen. The first part is CH, the ISO 3166-1 alpha-2 code of Switzerland. The second part is two letters, currently used in vehicle registration plates.

== Current codes ==
Subdivision names are listed as in the ISO 3166-2 standard published by the ISO 3166 Maintenance Agency (ISO 3166/MA).

ISO 639-1 codes are used to represent subdivision names in the following administrative languages:

- (de): German
- (fr): French
- (it): Italian
- (rm): Romansh

Click on the button in the header to sort each column.

Code	Subdivision name
CH-AG	Aargau (de)
CH-AR	Appenzell Ausserrhoden (de)
CH-AI	Appenzell Innerrhoden (de)
CH-BL	Basel-Landschaft (de)
CH-BS	Basel-Stadt (de)
CH-BE	Bern (de), Berne (fr)
CH-FR	Fribourg (fr), Freiburg (de)
CH-GE	Genève (fr)
CH-GL	Glarus (de)
CH-GR	Graubünden (de), Grigioni (it), Grischun (rm)
CH-JU	Jura (fr)
CH-LU	Luzern (de)
CH-NE	Neuchâtel (fr)
CH-NW	Nidwalden (de)
CH-OW	Obwalden (de)
CH-SG	Sankt Gallen (de)
CH-SH	Schaffhausen (de)
CH-SZ	Schwyz (de)
CH-SO	Solothurn (de)
CH-TG	Thurgau (de)
CH-TI	Ticino (it)
CH-UR	Uri (de)
CH-VS	Valais (fr), Wallis (de)
CH-VD	Vaud (fr)
CH-ZG	Zug (de)
CH-ZH	Zürich (de)

== Changes ==
The following changes to the entry have been announced in newsletters by the ISO 3166/MA since the first publication of ISO 3166-2 in 1998:

Newsletter	Date issued	Description of change in newsletter
Newsletter I-5	2003-09-05	Spelling correction of CH-AI and CH-AR. New list source
Online Browsing Platform (OBP)	2020-11-24	Deletion of canton CH-GR in fra; Update List Source

== See also ==
- Subdivisions of Switzerland
- FIPS region codes of Switzerland
- NUTS codes of Switzerland
- Comparison of ISO, FIPS, and NUTS codes of the cantons of Switzerland
- Neighbouring countries: AT, DE, FR, IT, LI
