= Voting in Switzerland =

Voting in Switzerland (called votation) is the process by which Swiss citizens make decisions about governance and elect officials. The history of voting rights in Switzerland mirrors the complexity of the nation itself. The polling stations are opened on Saturdays and Sunday mornings but most people vote by post in advance. At noon on Sunday (Abstimmungssonntag in German, Dimanche de votation in French), voting ends and the results are usually known during the afternoon.

Switzerland's voting system is unique among modern democratic nations in that Switzerland practises direct democracy in parallel with representative democracy, which is why the Swiss system is known as a semi-direct democracy. Direct democracy allows any citizen to challenge any law approved by the parliament or, at any time, propose a modification of the federal Constitution. In addition, in most cantons all votes are cast using paper ballots that are manually counted. At the federal level, voting can be organised for:

- Elections (election of the Federal Assembly)
- Mandatory referendums (votation on a modification of the constitution made by the Federal Assembly)
- Optional referendums (referendum on a law accepted by the Federal Assembly and, that collected 50,000 signatures of opponents)
- Federal popular initiatives (votation on a modification of the constitution made by citizens and that collected 100,000 signatures of supporters)

Approximately four times a year, voting occurs over various issues; these include both initiatives and referendums, where policies are directly voted on by people, and elections, where the populace votes for officials. Federal, cantonal and municipal issues are polled simultaneously, and a majority of votes are cast by mail. Between January 1995 and June 2005, Swiss citizens voted 31 times, to answer 103 federal questions, besides many more cantonal and municipal questions (during the same period, French citizens participated in only two referendums).

The most frequent themes are social issues (e.g. welfare, healthcare, and drug policy), public infrastructure (e.g. public transport and construction projects) and environmental issues (e.g. environment and nature protection), economics, public finances (including taxes), immigration, asylum, and education, but also about culture and media, state system, foreign affairs, and military issues – again on any of the three political levels.

Voter turnout in parliamentary elections saw a continuous decline since the 1970s, down to an all-time low of 42.2% in 1995. In recent years however, voter participation has been slowly growing again and as of March 2024, the average voter participation in National Council Elections for the last five years was 46.7%.

As of March 2024, the average vote participation in popular votes for the last five years was 49.7%. Federal popular initiatives of little public appeal sometimes cause participation of less than 30% of the electorate, but controversial issues such as a proposed abolition of the Swiss army or a possible accession of Switzerland into the European Union have seen turnouts over 60%.

It is often thought that the lower voter turnout is due to “selective participation” and should not be seen as disinterest in governance matters by Swiss citizens. Selective participation means that Swiss citizens are more likely to participate and vote on issues that are of importance to them. In 2016, approximately 90% of Swiss citizens participated in a vote at least once within a four-year period.

== Voting procedures ==
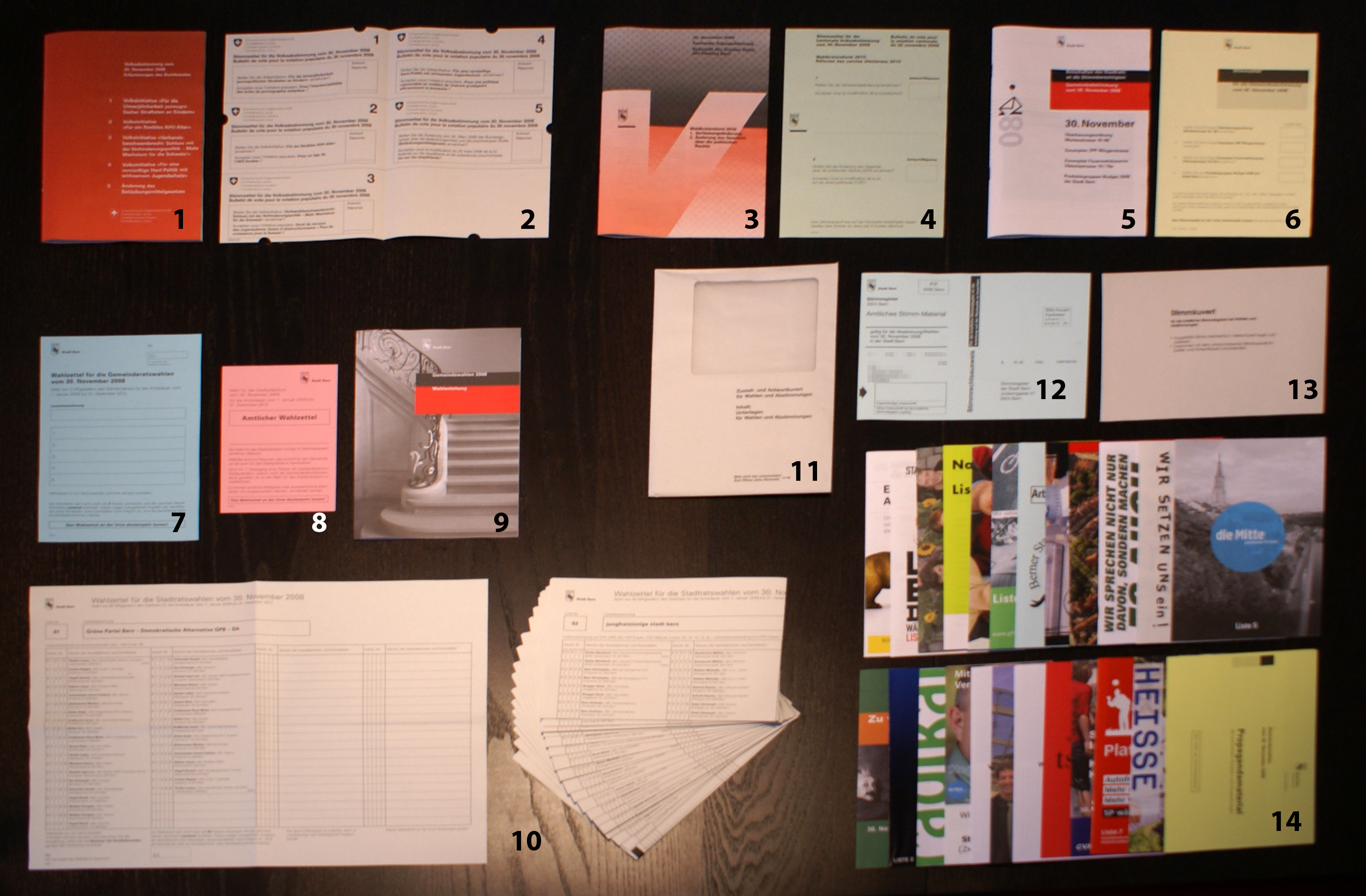
The ballots and other voting documents mailed to each citizen of Bern for the elections and referendums of 30 November 2008; here about 5 national, 2 cantonal, 4 municipal referendums, and 2 elections (government and parliament of the City of Bern) to take care of at the same time. (click the picture for further descriptions)

Depending on the Canton voting can be done through showing of hands, postal voting, at polling booths, or electronically through the internet.

Until 1971 some cantons punished citizens for not voting (with a fine equivalent to $3). In the canton of Schaffhausen, voting is still compulsory. This is one reason for the turnout there usually being a little higher than in the rest of the country.

There are no voting machines in Switzerland; all votes are counted by hand. How the votes are counted varies between municipalities. Municipalities can randomly recruit a number of citizens who have the duty of counting the ballots, but penalties for disobeying this duty are very rare. Additionally, not all municipalities know such an obligations, such as the canton of Fribourg which recruits students to count the votes. However, after people sort the ballots (e.g. "yes" and "no"), then the total number of "yes" and "no" votes are counted either manually or, in bigger cities, by an automatic counter (similar to ones used in banks to count banknotes); or the ballots are weighed by a precision balance. Vote counting is usually accomplished within five or six hours, but in large cities, such as Zurich or Geneva, counting the votes in parliamentary elections may take much longer.

=== Postal voting ===
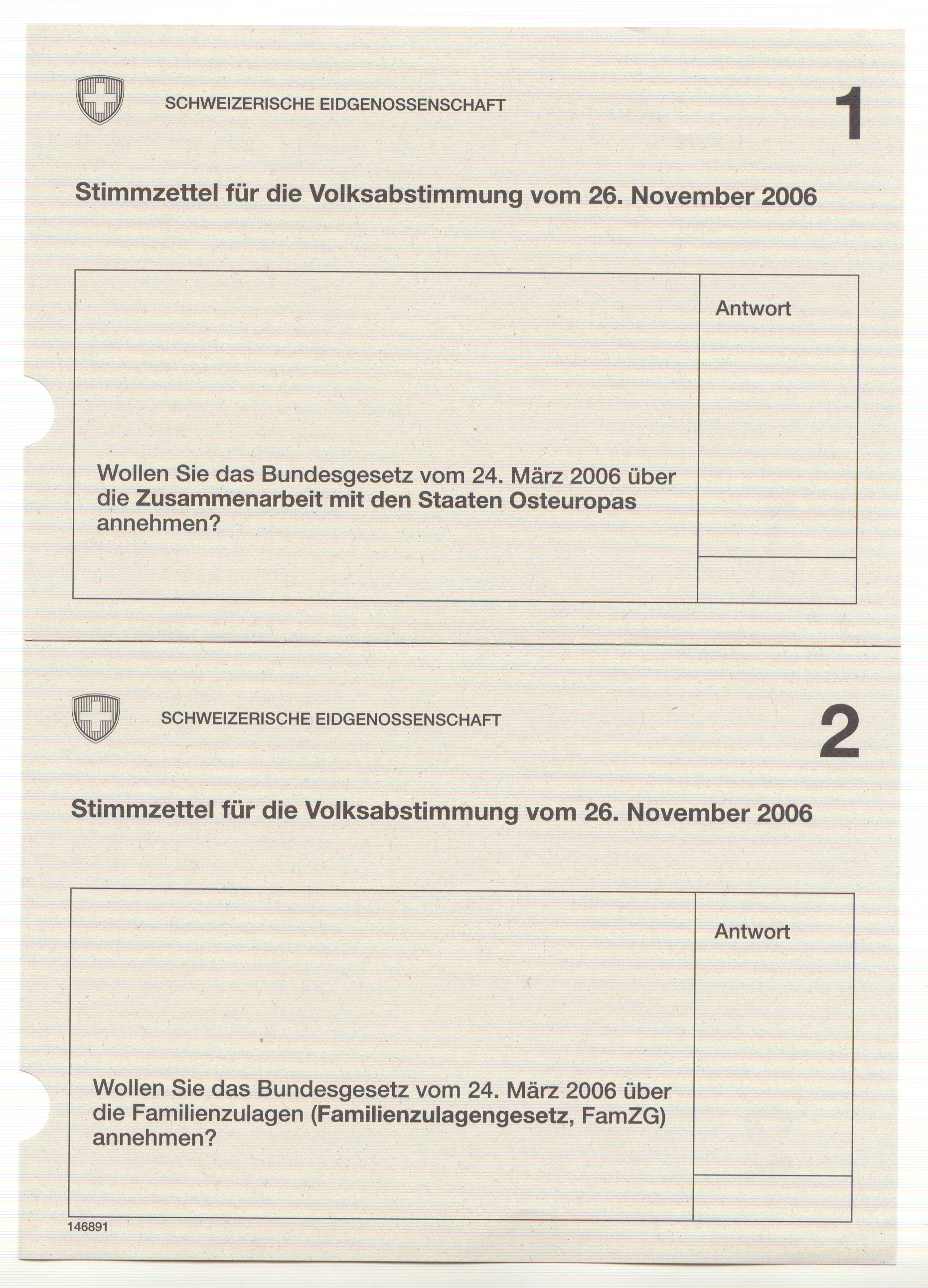
Referendum ballot where one can answer either "yes" or "no" in the box. For the English translation, click on the image. As Switzerland has four official languages, the ballots are distributed in four versions.

Voters are not required to register before elections in Switzerland. Since every person living in the country (both Swiss nationals and foreigners) must register with the municipality within two weeks of moving to a new place, the municipalities know the addresses of their citizens. Approximately two months before the polling date they send voters a letter containing an envelope (with the word "Ballots" on it), the ballot itself and a small booklet informing them about the proposed changes in the law. The booklet on the referendums also includes texts by both the federal council and the proponents of each referendum, allowing them to promote their position.

Once the voter has filled out their ballot these are put into an anonymous return envelope provided in the package. This first anonymous envelope and a signed transmission card that identify the voter is then put into the return envelope then sent back to the municipality. The return envelope is in fact the shipping envelope with a special opening strip that allow it to be reused to send back the vote. Many voters, especially in villages and small cities, put the return envelope directly into the municipality mailbox. Others return it by post, although not having to pay the postage in some cantons.

Once received at the municipality, the transmission card is checked to verify the right of the voter, then the anonymous return envelope is put into the ballot box with all the other votes.

=== Polling places ===
Voters also have an option to cast their vote directly at polling places. At polling places voters take the ballots that they have previously received in the mail and drop them off at the booth. However, after the introduction of postal voting most Swiss citizens do not utilise this service. Nowadays in-person voting mostly provides a safety net for people who forgot to cast their votes by mail. Polling stations have traditionally been frequented by organisations collecting signatures for federal popular initiatives.

=== Electronic voting ===
In 2003, in the Swiss canton of Geneva, some residents in the commune of Anières voted over the internet in a trial, marking the first time e-voting (electronic voting) was used in Switzerland for a binding referendum.

The government has allowed cantons to gradually expand the use of e-voting over the years.

In 2015, the Federal Council allowed the following cantons to offer electronic voting (called e-voting there) to Swiss persons living abroad who are registered in these cantons: Geneva, Lucerne, Basel-Stadt and Neuchâtel. This means about 34,000 registered Swiss abroad could vote electronically.

For voters living in Switzerland, the Federal Council offered the opportunity to vote over the Internet only to voters in the cantons of Geneva and Neuchâtel. About 90,000 persons living in Switzerland were able to vote online.

As of 2019, two e-voting systems are in use in Switzerland. CHVote, from Geneva, is in use in cantons Vaud, Bern, Lucerne, Basel City, St Gallen and Aargau. The system is open-source software licensed under the AGPL. But in 2018, Geneva decided to start to phase it out for cost reasons.

The other system is sVote from Swiss Post, proprietary but disclosed software developed by Scytl. As of 2018 It was used in Fribourg, Neuchâtel and Thurgau.

In 2019, politicians and computer experts launched a people's initiative to ban the use of e-voting for security reasons.

== Elections ==
There are three main election types. The first two: parliamentary elections and executive elections, allow Swiss citizens to vote for candidates to represent them in the government. Parliamentary elections are organized around a proportional multi-party voting system, and executive elections are organized around a popular vote directly for individuals, where the individual with the most votes wins. The third type of election, referendums, concern policy issues.

=== National Council ===
Rules for the National Council are made federally. If a canton has two or more seats in the National Council, a so-called proportional representation takes place. The ballot has as many lists as candidates are running. While citizens can propose a list, most are presented by parties. Any citizen can run for election.

Voters can either use a ready-made party ballot or a clear ballot. On both they can write in every candidate up to two times, and they can write in candidates of other lists. If they choose to leave some lines empty, they can give all the empty lines to one party, which constitutes a so-called party vote. For example, a voter can use the Social Democratic ballot with the candidates A, B, and C, but choose to strike B and C, and write in D from the Greens. A will get a candidate vote as well as D, and the Social Democrats will gain 2 votes overall and the Green 1.

Party votes and votes given to a single candidate (so-called candidate votes) are added and compose the number of votes for the list. If a list wins one or more seats, the candidates with the highest number of candidate votes wins.

Lists can join each other in an apparentment and sub-apparentments. For example, if the Social Democratic Party chooses to run with two lists, they can form a sub-apparentment. This sub-apparentment can then join an apparentment with the Green Party. In the voting outcome, they are first treated as one list: seats are given to the apparentment depending on how many votes it received as a whole. As the voting outcome is calculated based on the Hagenbach-Bischoff system, the last seat in every canton goes to the list or apparentment with the highest number of not regarded votes for the ordinarily given seats.

For example, in the 2007 National Council elections in the Canton of Jura, the parties received the following percentage of votes (sub-apparentments are already calculated):

- Social Democratic Party of Switzerland: 36.9%
- Christian Democratic People's Party of Switzerland: 25.0%
- Swiss People's Party: 13.7%
- FDP.The Liberals: 13.4%

Two seats were to be elected. One seat went to the Social Democrats. The Liberals and the People's Party had made an apparentment. Together, they gained 27.1% which was 2.1 percentage points more than the Christian Democratic Party. The second seat went to the People's Party (Dominique Baettig) although that party received fewer votes than the Christian Democratic Party.

Cantons with only one representative such as Nidwalden elect them via first-past-the-post voting amended by apparentment.

=== Council of States ===
Members of the Council of States are elected through different systems as decided by the cantons, because the body represents Switzerland's cantons (member states). However, there is a uniform mode of election taking place on the same date as the nationwide National Council elections. This procedure is the plurality voting system ("Majorzwahl" in German). In the canton of Zug and the canton of Appenzell Innerrhoden, the elections take place before the other cantons according to Majorzwahl.

With the exception of the cantons of Neuchâtel and Jura (which use proportional representation to elect their councilors), councilors are elected through an up to two-round system of voting. In the first round of voting, candidates must obtain an absolute majority of the vote in order to be elected. If no candidate receives an absolute majority in the first round of voting then a second round is held in which a simple plurality is sufficient to be elected. The top two finishing candidates in the second round are elected.

=== Cantonal elections ===
The voters can also vote for the government of each canton. The ballot has only one line where the voter can place the full name of any of-age citizen that lives in the said canton, i.e. a write-in candidate. There are no party votes, only candidate votes; so this procedure is called ("Majorzwahl") where the candidate with the most votes wins. However, cantons use a two-round system, during the first ballot only candidates which win an absolute majority are elected. If not all officers are elected during the first round as second round takes place where a simple majority is sufficient to be elected (known as plurality in the US).

All Cantons have a single chamber parliament mostly elected by proportional representation. Most of them have several electoral districts of different size and some varieties in the formulas to calculate the seats per party. Graubünden and both Appenzells elect their parliament in majority system.

== Referendums ==
=== Legislative referendums ===
Citizens can call constitutional and legislative referendums. Legislative referendums are only possible on laws passed by the legislature. Citizens cannot initiate legislation of their own crafting through legislative referendums. The electorate, however, has the right to initiate constitutional legislation with a federal popular initiative (see below).

For each proposal there is a box on the ballot which the voter has to fill with either a "Yes" or a "No". If there are proposals that contradict each other, there is also a tie-break question: "If both proposals are adopted by the people, which proposal do you favor? (the so-called "subsidiary question" introduced in 1987). To challenge a law, citizens must collect 50,000 signatures within 100 days of the official publication of a new law. If they manage to do it, a nationwide referendum is held. And if the majority of the voters reject the law, it is canceled.

==== Influence of the legislative referendums on the political system ====
The possibility for the citizens to challenge any law influences the whole political system. It encourages parties to form coalition governments, to minimize the risk that an important party tries to block the action of the government by systematically launching referendums. It gives legitimacy to political decisions. It forces the authorities to listen to all sectors of the population, to minimize the risk that they reject new laws in referendums. Before presenting a new bill to the parliament, the federal government usually makes a wide consultation to ensure that no significant group is frontally opposed to it, and willing to launch a referendum.

=== Constitutional referendums (Popular initiatives) ===
Modifications to the constitution are subject to obligatory vote and require a double majority both of all voters nationally and of the cantons. Such votes are called when the parliament proposes a constitutional modification, or when 100,000 citizens sign in eighteen months a federal popular initiative that clearly states a proposed constitutional change. And the minimum participation has to be higher than 40% (as cantonal referendum procedure). If the appropriate number of citizens sign onto the popular initiative within the eighteen month timeframe, the Federal Council and Parliament will deliberate whether or not to recommend the initiative for official legislation. Once approved, new constitutional provisions will be made based upon the already existing legislation the new initiative affects.

With respect to the cantonal vote, 20 of the 26 cantons have each one vote, but the 6 so-called half-cantons (because they were so historically split centuries ago) only have a half vote each. The cantonal vote is determined by a popular vote among the people of that canton; if the majority supports a proposal then the canton as a whole is regarded as supporting the proposal.

This cantonal vote means that small cantons are represented equally with the larger ones. For example, Basel-Country as a canton has about 256,000 inhabitants, but has only half a cantonal vote (the other "half canton" being Basel-City). On the other hand, the canton of Uri has a full cantonal vote, but only 35,000 inhabitants.

More than 550 referendums have occurred since the constitution of 1848 (legislative or constitutional).

== Municipal voting ==
Every village, town or city has a deliberative assembly — in some villages, it is the town meeting, where all adult citizens may vote by show of hands. At such meetings the citizen can also present oral or written proposals which are voted on at the next meeting. In larger towns, elected assemblies take the place of the town meetings which are usually elected by proportional representation in one or more districts.

Municipal government is always elected by the citizens, mostly in a majority voting with some exceptions. Those municipal councils have about five to nine members. Loosely one can say, the smaller the town, the fewer party members are in the council. The leader of the council is mostly also voted by the citizens in a majority voting.

The municipal assemblies vote on changes to the "town statutes" (Gemeindereglement), governing such matters as the use of public space, on financial commitments exceeding the competence of the executive branch, and on naturalisations.

== Competences at different levels ==
Distribution of powers and responsibilities
Federal powers (Swiss Constitution)	Cantonal powers (cantonal constitutions)	Municipal powers (cantonal legislation)
Organisation of federal authorities	Organisation of cantonal authorities (own constitution, own anthem, own flag)	Education (kindergarten and primary schools)
Foreign affairs	Cross-border cooperation	Municipal taxes
Army and civil protection	Police	Waste management
National roads (highways)	Relations between religion and state	Municipal streets
Nuclear energy	Culture	Local infrastructure
Postal services and telecommunication	Public health	Local police
Monetary policy	Cantonal streets	Zoning
Social security (pensions, invalids)	Forests, water, natural resources	Citizenship
Federal taxes	Education (secondary schools and universities)	
Civil law, criminal law	Protection of the environment	
Civil and criminal procedure	Protection of nature and heritage	
Customs	Citizenship	
Education (technical universities)	Cantonal taxes	
Energy policy		
Principles for zoning		
Protection of the environment		
Citizenship		

== Voting qualifications ==
The country as of 2018 has about 8.5 million inhabitants, 6.25 million of which are Swiss citizens who have the right to vote once 18 years old. Switzerland has restrictive citizenship laws that tend to exclude immigrants from being able to participate in political processes. According to the 2022 Federal Statistical Office data, noncitizens make up 26% of the Swiss population, including over 400,000 Swiss-born individuals, who are barred from voting in federal elections. In some cantons and communes, non-Swiss citizens have the right to vote in cantonal and communal ballots if they have lived a certain number of years in Switzerland.

All Swiss citizens aged 18 years or older have been allowed to vote at the federal level since women were granted suffrage on 7 February 1971. All adult citizens have been able to vote at the canton level since 27 November 1990, when Appenzell Innerrhoden, the last canton to deny universal suffrage, was compelled by a federal court decision.

In addition, Swiss citizens living outside of the country who are older than 18 are also allowed to vote on federal matters and, in some cantons, on cantonal matters. For these voters, registration through the local or nearest Swiss consulate is compulsory (as they are not already registered in the municipality in which they live). They can choose to register at the most recent Swiss municipality in which they were registered previously, or at their place of origin otherwise.

Switzerland does not fully comply with the UN Convention on the Rights of Persons with Disabilities regarding the access and ability for people with disabilities to vote and participate in political processes. In March 2023, the Swiss Parliament held the first special session for people living with disabilities which concluded with resolutions to strengthen political representation of people with disabilities, ensuring people with disabilities had access to information about elections and could vote without hinderance, and the creation of an extra-parliamentary Disability Commission to improve consultation with people with disabilities as experts.

=== Votes on citizenship ===
The municipal parliament, administration or a naturalisation committee decides about naturalisations. However, in some towns, naturalisations were subject to a popular vote. The Supreme Court decided in 2003 that naturalisations were an administrative act and thus must obey the prohibition of arbitrariness, which rules out rejections by anonymous popular vote without an explanatory statement.

There are ongoing discussions about changing the rules: one proposal consists of automatically naturalising foreigners if they fulfill the formal criteria, and citizens can propose non-naturalisation if they give a reason for the proposal. The proposal would be voted on, and if the foreigner doesn't accept the outcome of the vote, he can order the court to verify the objectivity of the reasons. Some politicians have started a federal popular initiative to change the Swiss Constitution in order to make votes on naturalizations legal, but it reached a referendum in June 2008 and was soundly rejected.

== See also ==
"Swiss political system", document about Swiss democracy, inside of a CD_ROM made by the Swiss Department of Foreign Affairs

- Women's suffrage in Switzerland
- List of Swiss federal referendums
- Right of foreigners to vote in Switzerland
- Direct democracy
- Landsgemeinde
- Panachage
- Politics of Switzerland
- Political rights act (Switzerland)

== Bibliography ==
- Cormon, Pierre (2015), Swiss Politics for Complete Beginners (2 ed.), Geneva, Switzerland: Slatkine, ISBN 978-2-8321-0607-5
- Vincent Golay and Mix et Remix, Swiss political institutions, Éditions loisirs et pédagogie, 2008. ISBN 978-2-606-01295-3.
- Hirschbühl, Tina (2011a), The Swiss Government Report 1, Federal Department of Foreign Affairs FDFA, Presence Switzerland, archived from the original on 19 December 2021 – via YouTube
- Hirschbühl, Tina (2011b), The Swiss Government Report 2, Federal Department of Foreign Affairs FDFA, Presence Switzerland, archived from the original on 19 December 2021 – via YouTube
- Hirschbühl, Tina (2011c), How Direct Democracy Works In Switzerland - Report 3, Federal Department of Foreign Affairs FDFA, Presence Switzerland, archived from the original on 19 December 2021 – via YouTube
- Hirschbühl, Tina (2011d), How People in Switzerland Vote - Report 4, Federal Department of Foreign Affairs FDFA, Presence Switzerland, archived from the original on 19 December 2021 – via YouTube
- Hirschbühl, Tina (2011e), Switzerland & the EU: The Bilateral Agreements - Report 5, Federal Department of Foreign Affairs FDFA, Presence Switzerland, archived from the original on 19 December 2021 – via YouTube
- Marabello, Thomas Quinn. "Challenges to Swiss Democracy: Neutrality, Napoleon, & Nationalism," Swiss American Historical Society Review, Jun. 2023, Vol. 59: No. 2. Available at: https://scholarsarchive.byu.edu/sahs_review/vol59/iss2/5
