= List of regions of Switzerland by Human Development Index =

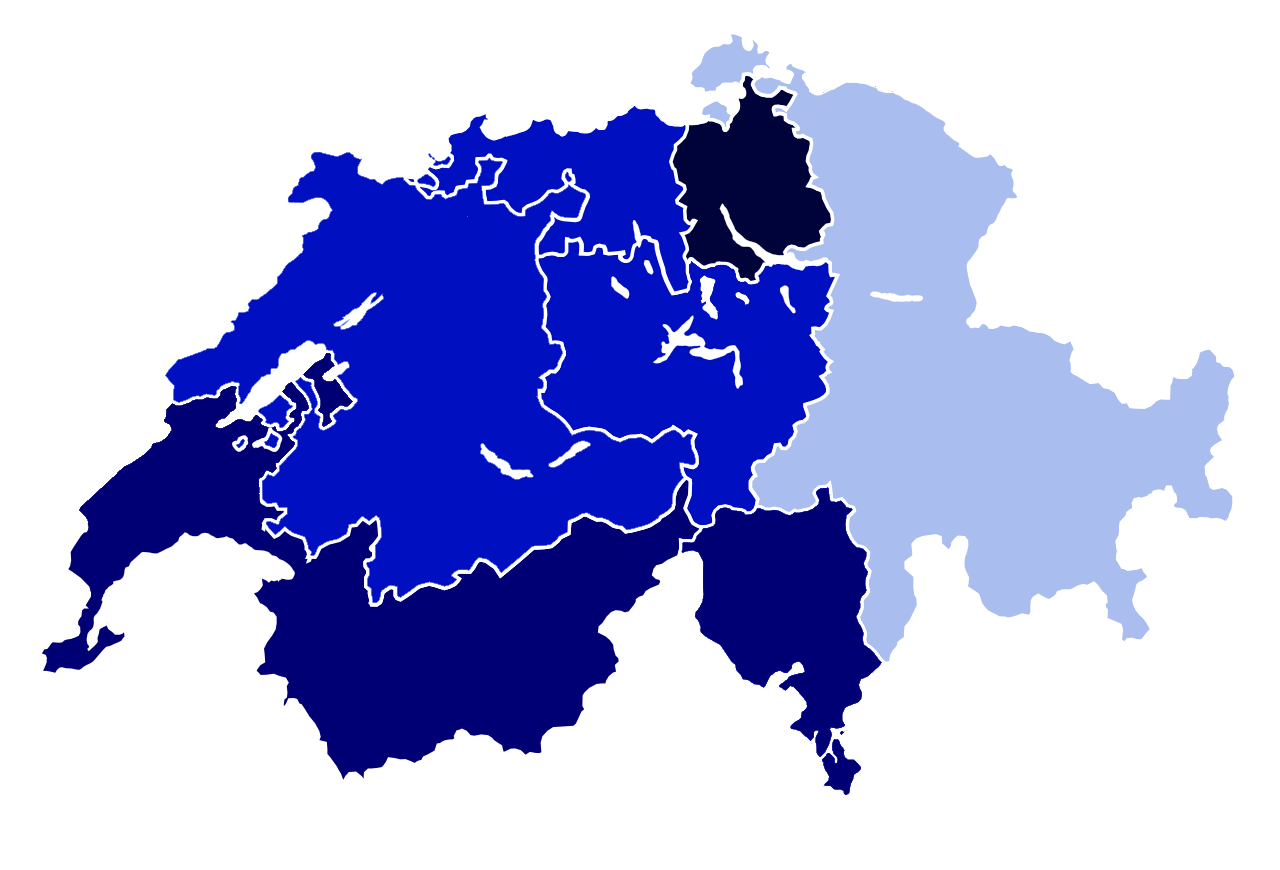
Regional HDI of Switzerland in 2023 (2022 Report) Caption: > 0.975 0.965 – 0.975 0.955 – 0.965 < 0.955

This is a list of NUTS2 statistical regions of Switzerland by Human Development Index as of 2025 with data for the year 2023. In the same year the Zurich Region had the highest HDI score out of 1790 sub-national regions of the world.

Rank	Region	HDI (2023)
Very High human development
1	Zurich	0.993
2	Lake Geneva region (Geneva, Vaud, Valais)	0.976
-	Switzerland (average)	0.970
3	Ticino	0.965
4	Northwestern Switzerland (Basel and Aargau)	0.964
5	Espace Mittelland (Bern, Fribourg, Jura, Neuchâtel, Solothurn)	0.963
6	Central Switzerland (Uri, Schwyz, Obwalden, Nidwalden, Lucerne, Zug)	0.962
7	Eastern Switzerland (Schaffhausen, Thurgau, St. Gallen, Appenzell, Glarus, Grisons)	0.955
