= Non-citizen suffrage in Switzerland =

Voting rights of foreigners in Switzerland

Map of Switzerland, colored according to right of resident foreigners to vote in elections on cantonal and municipal level. Cantons according right to vote to foreigners in cantonal referendums and elections. Cantons or municipalities according right to vote and to stand for election to foreigners in municipal referendums and elections. Cantons or municipalities according right to vote to foreigners in municipal referendums and elections. Cantons giving municipalities the power to extend voting rights to foreigners in municipal referendums and elections. Cantons or municipalities which do not give the right to vote to foreigners.

Non-citizen suffrage in Switzerland is an ongoing political issue in the country. Switzerland is a federal nation. As such, the cantons have extensive powers to enact their own legislation (similar to the arrangement in the states of the United States). For this reason, the rules regarding the rights of non-citizen residents to vote differ considerably throughout Switzerland.

== Federal level ==
At federal level, exercising one's political rights in the strictest sense (the right to stand for election and to vote in popular initiatives and referendums) is limited to Swiss citizens aged 18 or over, as prescribed by Articles 136, 143 and 150 of the Swiss Federal Constitution. A bill proposing granting foreign residents the right to vote in federal elections was submitted to the Federal Council on 4 October 2000 but was rejected on 4 October 2011.

Under Article 36(1) of the Federal Constitution, the cantons have the power to grant political rights in cantonal and municipal elections which go beyond the minimum federal threshold (such as lowering the voting age and extending the right to vote to foreign nationals). The cantons also have the option to delegate these powers to the municipalities. Therefore, in theory, foreigners can be elected to the Council of States, as Article 150(3) of the Constitution states: "The Cantons determine the rules for the election of their representatives to the Council of States."

Only the cantons of Jura and Neuchâtel grant foreigners the right to vote in cantonal elections, but neither allow foreigners to stand for election at cantonal level. At municipal level, 600 municipalities across six cantons (Appenzell Ausserrhoden, Fribourg, Graubünden, Jura, Neuchâtel and Vaud) grant foreigners the right to stand for election.

== Aargau ==
In 1996, a referendum was held to decide whether to grant to foreigners the right to vote and stand for election in the Canton of Aargau. The proposal was rejected by voters.

== Appenzell Ausserrhoden ==
Article 105(2) of the Appenzell Ausserrhoden Cantonal Constitution of 30 April 1995 gives the municipalities of this canton the freedom to grant (or not) political rights to foreigners, provided that such foreigners have been resident in Switzerland for at least ten years and have lived in the canton for at least five years. Three of the twenty municipalities have granted foreigners voting rights: Wald (1999), Speicher (2002) and Trogen (2004). In Speicher, Switzerland's first foreigner was elected to political office – a Dutchman who has since naturalised as a Swiss citizen.

== Basel-Stadt ==
The Canton of Basel-Stadt has a large foreign population – 50,000 people, who make up 30% of the total population. In 2005, the canton inserted a clause into its constitution (which entered into force on 13 November 2006) giving each of its three municipalities (Basel, Bettingen and Riehen) the power to extend the right to vote and stand for election at municipal level to "residents other than those who hold Swiss nationality who are at least 18 years of age". In reality, only the two autonomous municipalities (Bettingen and Riehen) have this power, as Basel is administered directly by the canton.

== Bern ==
In April 2005, the Grand Council (parliament) of the Canton of Bern refused by 98 votes to 86 a bill from the cantonal government to grant the municipalities the freedom to grant (or not) foreigners the right to vote at municipal level. Had this bill been approved, it would have allowed foreigners the right to vote provided that they had lived in Switzerland for at least ten years, in the canton for at least five years and in the same municipality for at least three months.

A similar bill, brought by the Bern Social Democratic Party and the Independent Socialist Party, was rejected on 25 January 2007 by 77 votes to 73, although it was again supported by the cantonal government. Opponents to the bill primarily came from the bourgeois bloc, the Swiss People's Party and the Free (or "Radical") Democratic Party, although the latter had been in favour of the 2005 bill.

In August 2008, a popular initiative supported by the socialists, the Green Party and the Swiss Federation of Trade Unions gained enough signatures (12,500) to amend the Bern Cantonal Constitution to allow each municipality to decide whether to grant voting rights to foreign residents. The subsequent referendum was rejected by voters on 26 September 2010.

== Fribourg ==
The new constitution of the Canton of Fribourg, adopted on 16 May 2004, states in Article 48: "The following have the right to vote and stand for election at municipal level, providing that they are of voting age: […] foreigners and foreigners resident in their respective municipality who have been resident in the canton for at least five years and who have a residence permit.”

The Law of 16 March 2005 granting political rights to foreigners and to Swiss citizens living abroad amended the Law on the exercising of political rights, bringing the latter into conformity with the new constitution. This law also states: “any person who enjoys political rights at municipal level may stand for election.”

== Geneva ==
On 24 April 2005, 52.3% of voters in the Canton of Geneva approved an initiative granting voting rights at municipal level to foreigners who have lived in the canton for at least eight years. Another initiative granting foreigners the right to stand for election gained only 47.2% support. Geneva became the sixth canton in Switzerland to grant political rights to foreign residents.

This vote came after four unsuccessful earlier attempts. On 17 June 1979, 56.3% of voters rejected an initiative to grant foreigners the right to vote and stand for election at industrial-tribunal elections. On 6 June 1993, 71.3% of voters refused an initiative granting foreigners the right to vote and stand for election at municipal level. On 28 November 1993, the same percentage of voters refused a second initiative granting foreigners only the right to vote. On 4 March 2001, 52% of voters refused an initiative to create a constitutional law granting foreigners the right to vote and stand for election at municipal level.

Article 42 of the Cantonal Constitution was amended to allow foreign residents the right to vote at municipal elections provided that they have been legally resident in Switzerland for at least eight years. However, foreign residents do not have the right to stand for election.

The constitutional provision relating to foreigners’ voting rights is directly enforceable and applicable. However, a bill amending the Law on the exercising of political rights was approved on 14 September 2005 to bring legislation in line with the constitution.

== Glarus ==
At a Landsgemeinde on 2 May 2010, the voters of the Canton of Glarus rejected a proposal to grant foreigners the right to vote.

== Graubünden ==
Article 9 of the Constitution of the Canton of Graubünden of 14 September 2003 enshrines Swiss citizens’ right to vote at cantonal level, but does not exclude this right being extended to foreigners, as it is up to the legislator to determine the details. No actual law was adopted to grant voting rights to foreigners.

Article 9 also states that the municipalities have the discretion to decide (or not) to grant foreigners both the right to vote and the right to stand for election. Ten of the canton's 208 municipalities have made use of this power: Bever, Bonaduz, Calfreise, Cazis, Conters im Prättigau, Fideris, Lüen, Masein, Portein (which merged into the municipality of Cazis on 1 January 2010) and Schnaus.

== Jura ==
When the Canton of Jura was formed in 1978, it immediately granted foreigners the right to vote.

The Cantonal Constitution grants voting rights to citizens "holding Swiss nationality" and states in Article 73: "the law defines and regulates the right to vote and other political rights of foreigners.”

Article 3 of the Law of 26 October 1978 on political rights states that foreigners may vote in municipal elections provided that they have been resident in the canton for at least ten years and in their respective municipality for at least 30 days. It states that foreigners enjoying the right to vote can also stand for election at municipal level.

This law also grants foreigners the right to vote at cantonal elections, under the sole condition that they have been resident in the canton for at least ten years.

On 21 February 2007, the cantonal parliament passed a law (by 51 votes to 4) granting foreigners the right to stand for election as mayor. All such candidates must have lived regularly in Switzerland for at least ten years, including at least one year in the Canton of Jura.

On 17 June 2007, the voters of Jura voted against a law allowing foreigners to stand for election, therefore revoking the earlier law.

On 28 September 2014, the cantonal government approved (by 54% of votes) a proposal re-granting foreigners the right to stand for election to all municipal offices except that of mayor.

== Lucerne ==
Article 15(2) of the draft of the new constitution of the Canton of Lucerne allowed municipalities the discretion to grant (or not) foreigners the right to vote in municipal elections. However, this clause did not appear in the version of the constitution that was approved by popular vote on 17 June 2007.

== Neuchâtel ==
The Canton of Neuchâtel has allowed foreigners to vote in municipal elections since 1849. It briefly abolished this right but then reinstated it in 1875.

The Law of 17 October 1984 on political rights allows foreigners to vote in municipal elections provided that they are "in a regular situation" and have been resident in the canton for at least a year. Foreigners are also allowed to stand for election.

An amendment to the Cantonal Constitution in 2000 granted foreigners the right to vote in cantonal elections provided that they have been resident in the canton for at least five years.

In 1850, Neuchâtel granted foreign residents the right to vote, but not to stand for election, in municipal elections. During the 19th century, not even Swiss citizens were automatically guaranteed the right to stand for election if they originated from a different canton.

In June 2007, voters rejected a cantonal initiative that proposed granting foreigners the right to stand for election.

2016 saw the rules changed for both municipal and cantonal elections. At municipal level, foreigners and stateless persons who have been resident in a municipality of the canton, have a residence permit ("Permis C") and have been resident in the canton for at least one year are now allowed to stand for election. They may now also stand for election at cantonal level under the same requirements except they must have been resident in the canton for at least five years.

== Schaffhausen ==
In 2001, the voters of the Canton of Schaffhausen rejected a popular initiative proposing granting foreigners the right to vote.

On 28 September 2014, voters again rejected (by 85% of the vote) a proposal allowing foreigners to vote.

== Solothurn ==
In 1997, the voters of the Canton of Solothurn rejected (by 88.5% of the vote) a proposal allowing foreigners to vote.

== Thurgau ==
Article 19 of the Constitution of the Canton of Thurgau and Article 2(1) of the Law on political rights allows the municipalities to grant (or not) foreigners the right to vote at municipal level. As of 2009, only two municipalities – Langrickenbach and Lengwil – had taken up this option.

== Uri ==
The voters of the Canton of Uri rejected a popular initiative (by 84% of votes) proposing allowing foreigners complete political rights at both municipal and cantonal level.

== Vaud ==
Article 142 of the new Constitution of the Canton of Vaud, of 14 April 2003, specifies: “the following make up the electorate: […] foreigners who have been resident in a municipality anywhere in Switzerland and have held a residence permit for at least ten years and have also been resident in the canton for at least three years." To transpose the constitutional provision, the Law on the exercising of political rights was amended in 2003 to grant foreigners the right to vote. As the right to vote and the right to stand for election are indivisible rights in the law of Vaud, foreigners are also allowed to stand for election at municipal level. Only Swiss citizens have the right to vote and stand for election at cantonal level.

== Zug ==
An amendment providing for the possibility for the municipalities of the Canton of Zug to grant foreigners the right to vote at municipal elections was presented in September 2006 during debates surrounding the amendment of the Law on political rights. However, this provision was not retained in the final version of the amended law.

== Zurich ==
In 1993, the voters of the Canton of Zurich voted against a popular initiative (by 74.5% of votes) proposing granting foreigners political rights in the canton. An individual initiative launched by a citizen ("Einzelinitiative") which proposed introducing voting rights for foreigners in municipal elections was rejected in February 2007.
