= Subdivisions of the canton of Solothurn =

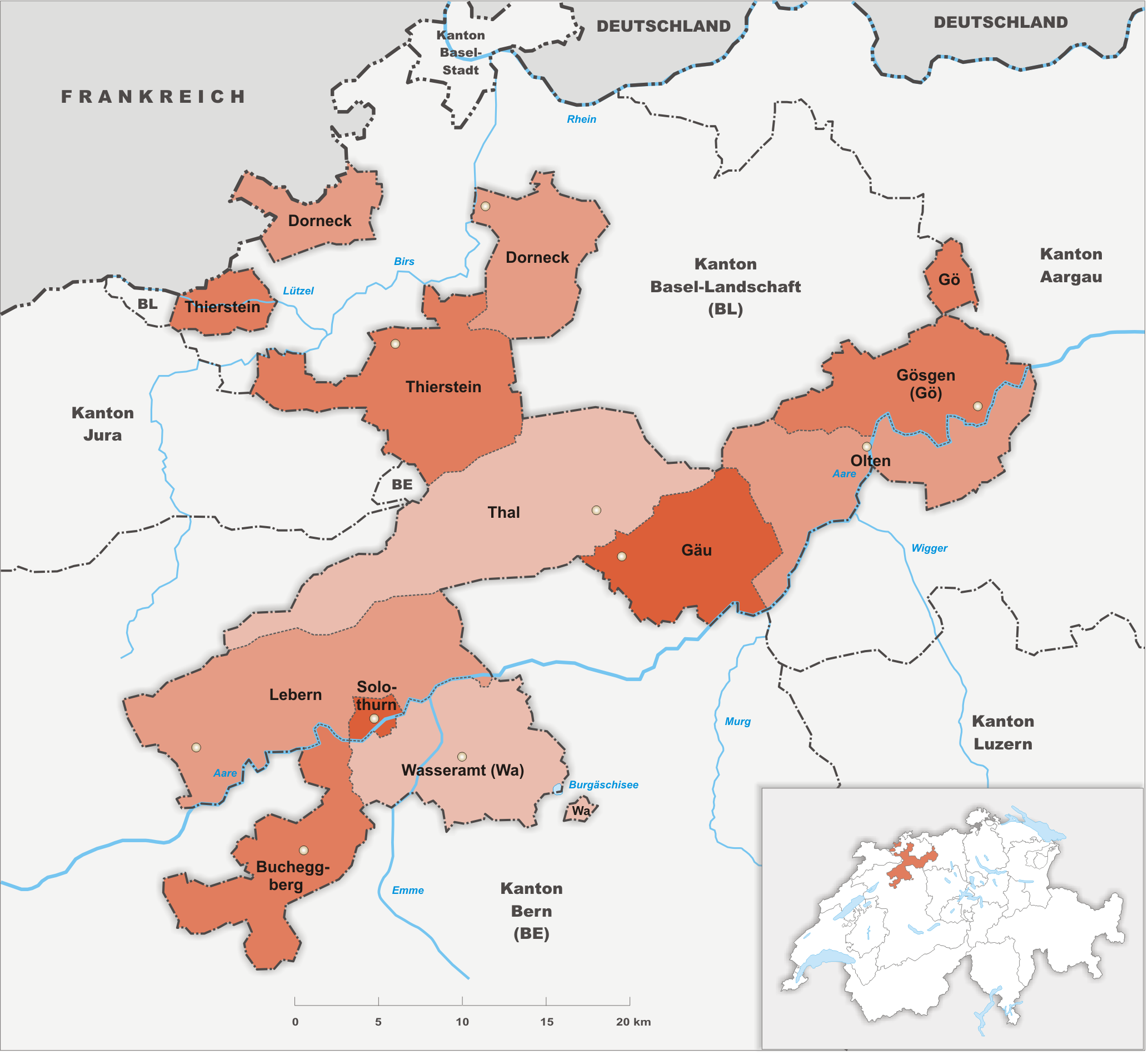
Districts in Solothurn

The Subdivisions of the canton of Solothurn include:

- 5 electoral districts (German: Amtei)
- 10 districts (German: Bezirk)
- 104 municipalities (German: Gemeinde)

Amtei	Bezirk
Dorneck-Thierstein	Dorneck District, Thierstein District
Olten-Gösgen	Olten District, Gösgen District
Solothurn-Lebern	Solothurn District, Lebern District
Thal-Gäu	Thal District, Gäu District
Wasseramt-Bucheggberg	Wasseramt District, Bucheggberg District

== See also ==
- Districts of Switzerland
- Municipalities of the canton of Solothurn
