= Northwestern Switzerland =

Coordinates: 47°25′41″N 7°53′06″E

Northwestern Switzerland Nordwestschweiz
- Region
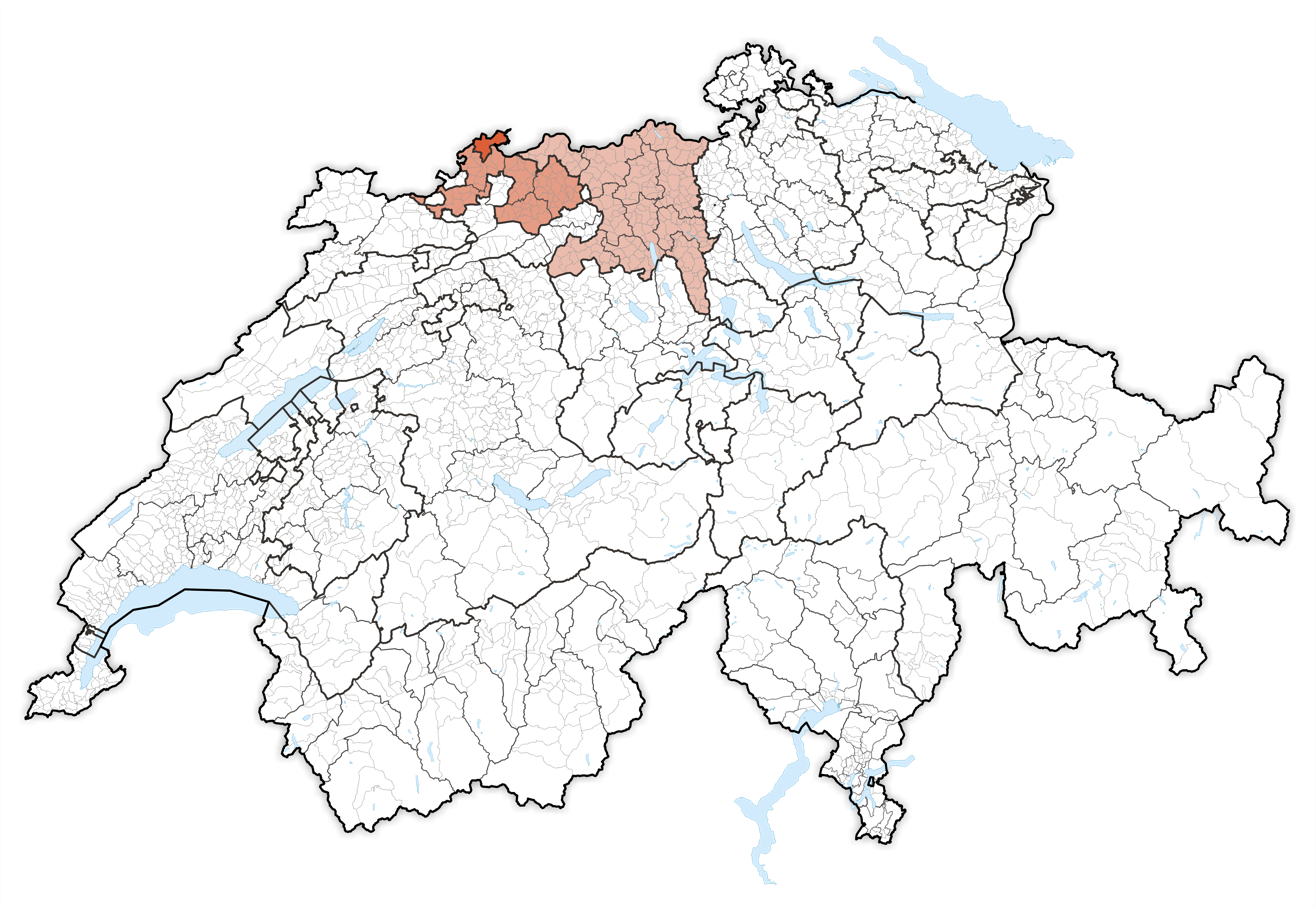
- Country: Switzerland

Area
  - Total: 1,958.2 km^{2} (756.1 sq mi)

Population (2024)
  - Total: 1,225,762
  - Density: 625.96/km^{2} (1,621.2/sq mi)

GDP
  - Total: CHF 111.553 billion (2022)
- NUTS code: CH03
- HDI (2022): 0.964 very high · 4th

Northwestern Switzerland (German: Nordwestschweiz, French: Suisse du Nord-Ouest, Italian: Svizzera nordoccidentale), is a subdivision of Switzerland as defined by the Federal Statistical Office for statistical purposes. It is classified as a NUTS-2 statistical region of Switzerland, and encompasses the cantons of Basel-Stadt, Basel-Landschaft, and Aargau. It is different from the traditional region of the same name (Nordwestschweiz in German), which also includes Basel-Stadt and Basel-Landschaft, certain northern parts of the Solothurn and only parts of the canton of Aargau.

== Sub-division ==
The country of Switzerland is federally organized into 26 cantons, which are the primary sub-divisions of the country. For statistical purposes, the Federal Statistical Office organizes the country into broader level sub-divisions based on cardinal directions. These are classified as a NUTS-2 statistical regions of Switzerland, and incorporate various cantons within it.

== Geography ==
Northwestern Switzerland consists of the areas towards the north-western periphery of the country, bordering Grand Est of France to the west and Baden-Württemberg of Germany to the north. The Basel Trinational Eurodistrict extends across the three countries, in the area between the Rhine valley and the plain of Alsace. The three countries meet in the middle of the Rhine River, slightly north of the Dreiländereck. The region encompasses an area of 1,958.2 km^{2} (756.1 sq mi), and had a population of over 1.22 million in 2024.

=== Sub-divisions ===
It encompasses the cantons of Basel-Stadt, Basel-Landschaft, and Aargau. It is different from the traditional region of the same name (Nordwestschweiz in German), which also includes Basel-Stadt and Basel-Landschaft, certain northern parts of the Solothurn and only parts of the canton of Aargau.

S.No.	Arms (Note: Cantonal coats of arms shown with cantonal heraldic colors (Standesfarben). Standesfarben were used to identify the (historical) cantons when the full banner was not available for display, although there is overlap; Unterwalden and Solothurn share the same colours, as do Basel and Appenzell, and with the accession of the modern cantons, Valais and Basel-City, and St. Gallen and Thurgau.)	Code	Name	Established	Capital	GDP (2020) in million CHF	GDP per capita (2020) in CHF	Population (2007)	Area (km^{2})	Density (per km^{2})	Municipalities (2018)	Official languages
1	Coat of arms of Aargau	AG	Aargau	1803 (Note: Act of Mediation; created from the cantons of Aargau (canton of the Helvetic Republic, from territory previously controlled by Bern) and Baden (previously a Swiss condominium), together with Fricktal (before 1802 not Swiss territory).)	Aarau	43,590	63,177	694,072	1,404	494	212	
2	Coat of arms of Basel-City	BS	Basel-Stadt	1501 (as Basel until 1999)	Basel	37,168	189,354	201,156	37	5,444	3	German
3	Coat of arms of Basel-Country	BL	Basel-Landschaft	1501 (as Basel until 1999)	Liestal	20,567	70,866	292,955	518	566	86	German

== Economy ==
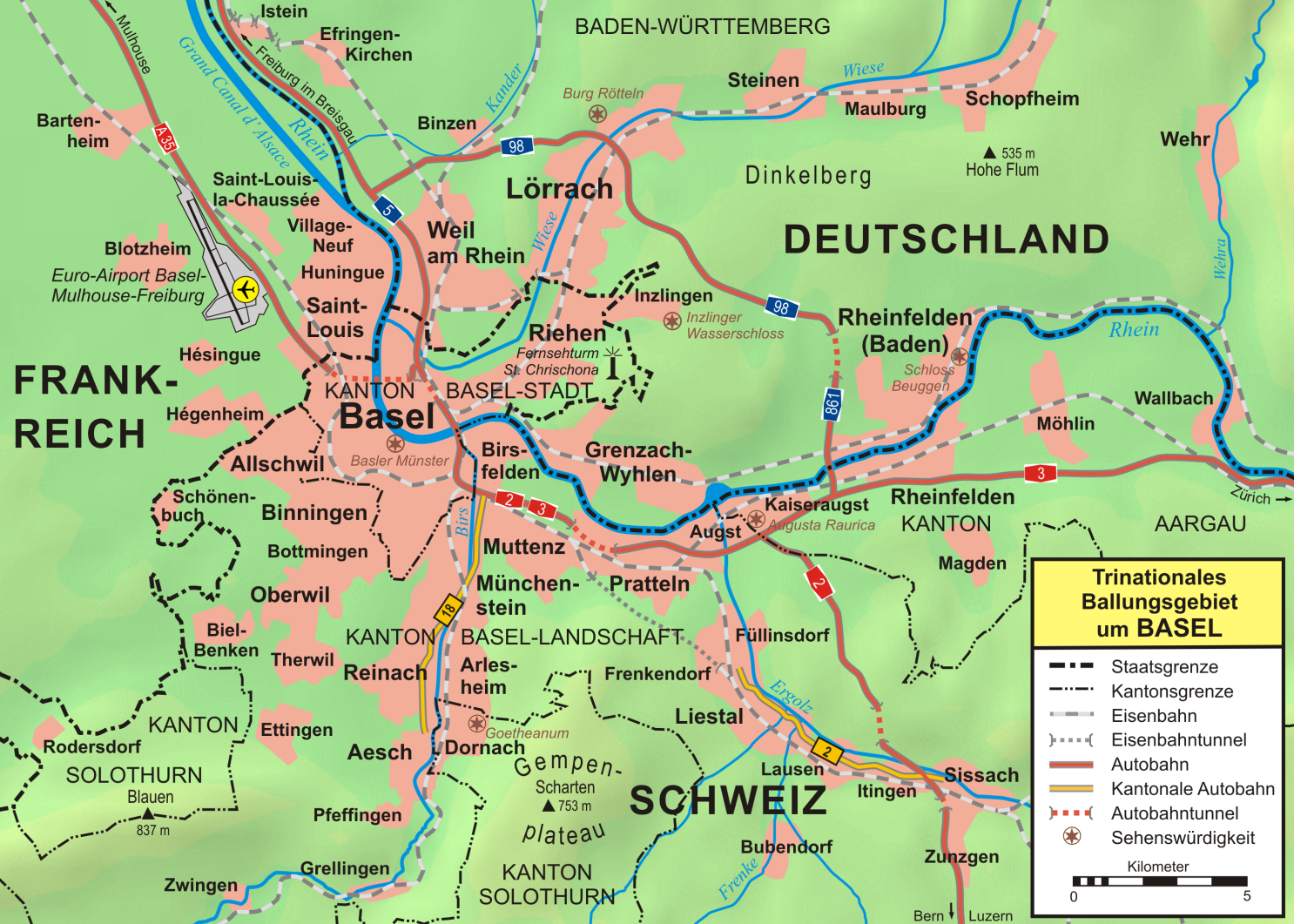
Trinational Eurodistrict of Basel is one of the major industrial centers.

The region is economically developed, and Basel area is one of the major economic centers of the country. Major industries include pharmaceuticals, chemicals, and textiles. The economic development started in the early 1900s, when mineral deposits were found in the area. This led to setting up of various industries in Pratteln. The construction of the Hauenstein Railway between Basel and Olten furthered economic growth as it connected the region with the other parts of the country. Liestal serves as the center of the textile industries, and is one of the most industrialized towns in the region.
