= Espace Mittelland =

Coordinates: 46°54′N 7°24′E

- Region
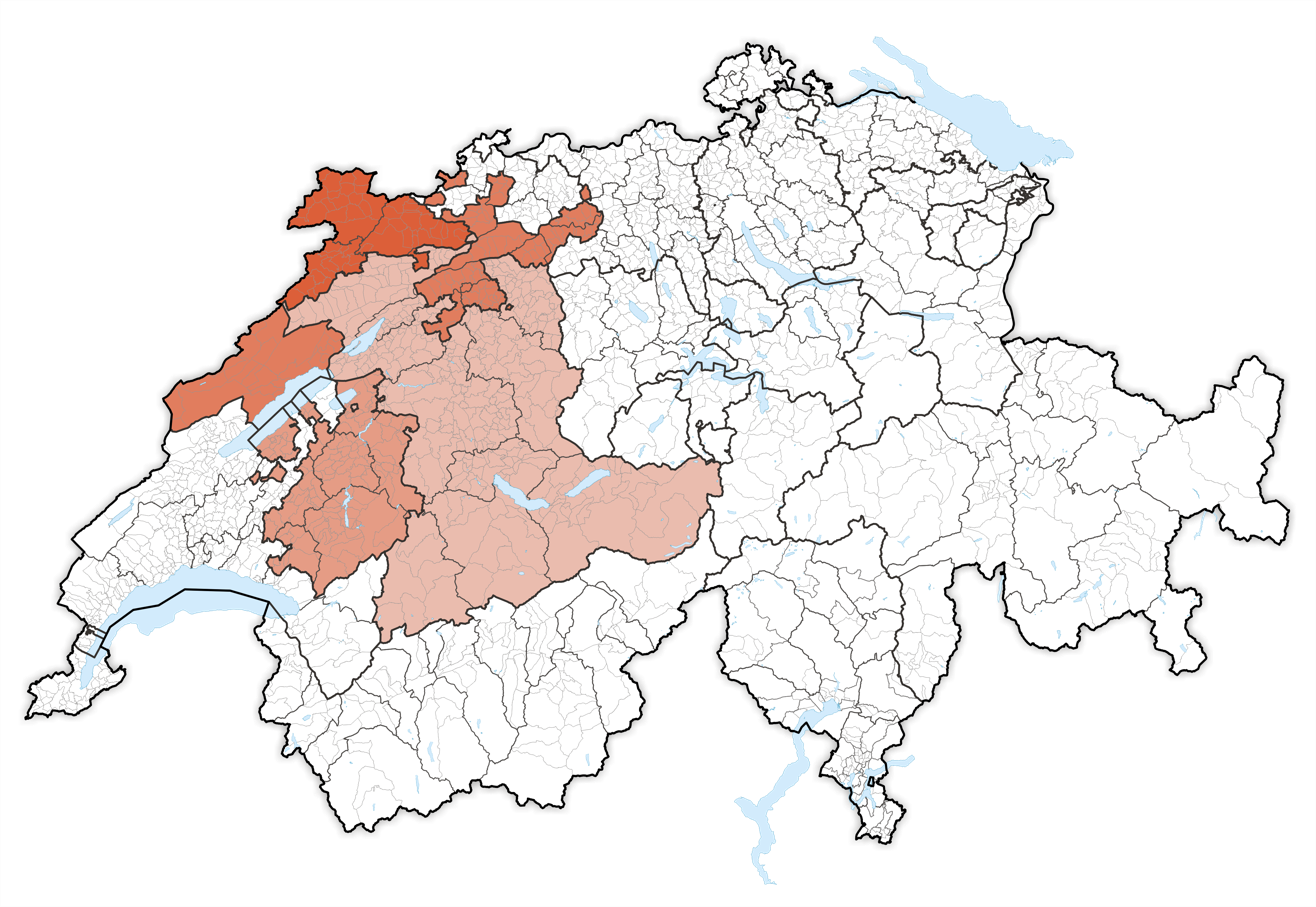
- Country: Switzerland

Area
  - Total: 10,062.2 km^{2} (3,885.0 sq mi)

Population (2007)
  - Total: 1,709,900
  - Density: 169.93/km^{2} (440.12/sq mi)

GDP
  - Total: CHF 156.072 billion (2022)
- NUTS code: CH02
- HDI (2022): 0.957 very high · 6th

Espace Mittelland, as defined by the Federal Statistical Office for statistical purposes, is a region of Switzerland, encompassing the cantons of Bern, Fribourg, Jura, Neuchâtel and Solothurn. It is one of the NUTS-2 regions of Switzerland.

The name includes a word from each of the two official languages spoken in this region: espace (French) here means "area", and Mittelland is the German name of the Swiss Central Plateau. This same mixed name is used in both official French- and German-language texts.
