= Lake Geneva region =

Coordinates: 46°24′N 6°54′E

Lake Geneva region Région lémanique Genferseeregion
- Region
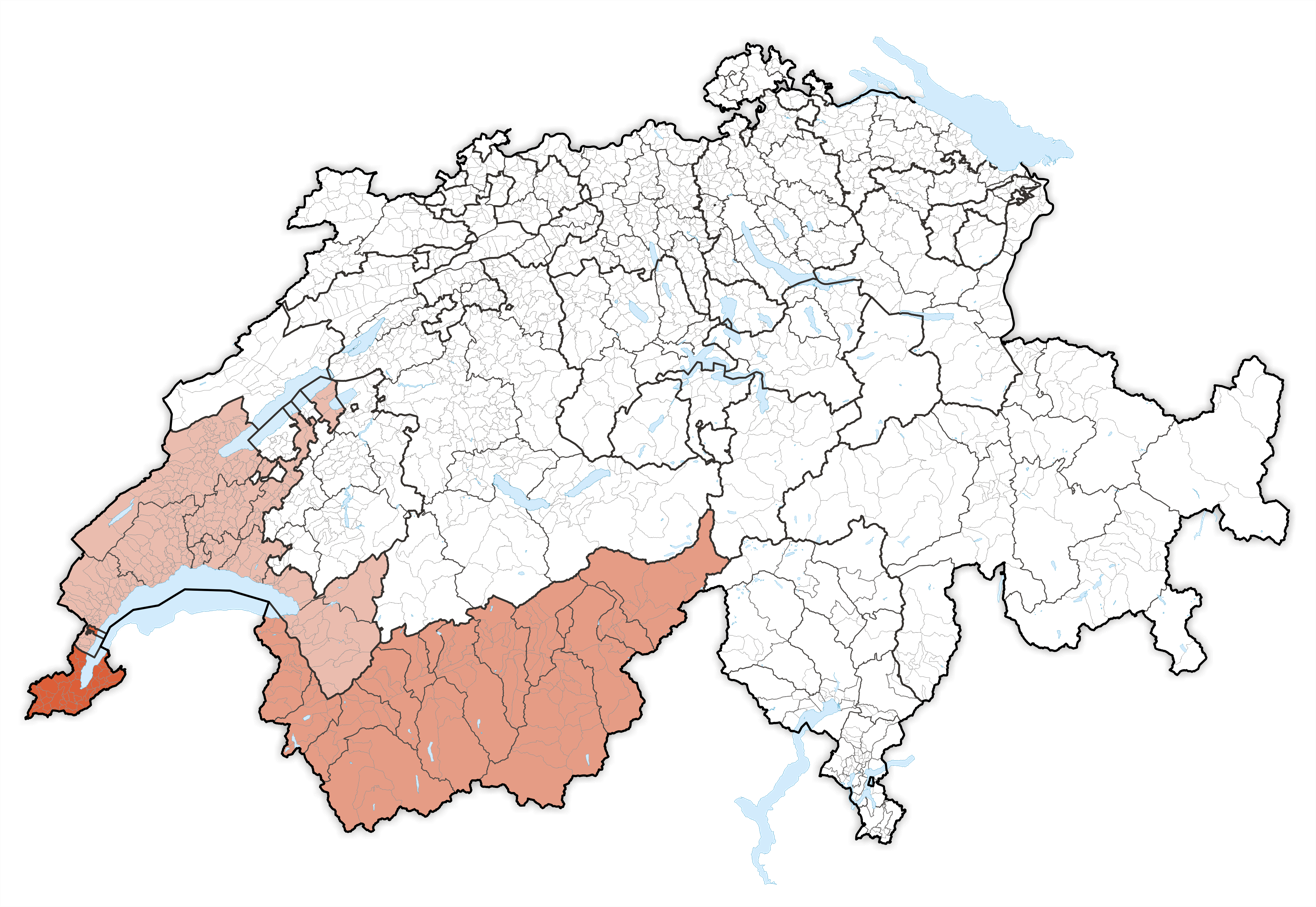
- Country: Switzerland

Area
  - Total: 8,718.6 km^{2} (3,366.3 sq mi)

Population (2007)
  - Total: 1,399,400
  - Density: 160.51/km^{2} (415.71/sq mi)

GDP
  - Total: CHF 147.538 billion (2022)
- NUTS code: CH01
- HDI (2022): 0.973 very high · 2nd
- Website: metropole-lemanique.ch

The Lake Geneva region is the region of Switzerland encompassing the cantons of Geneva, Vaud and Valais. It is one of the NUTS-2 regions of Switzerland.

The Lemanic Arc (French: Arc lémanique) is the region on the north side of Lake Léman, stretching out from Geneva to Lausanne and Montreux. Its parts are Geneva, La Côte, Lausanne, Lavaux, La Riviera and le Chablais.

The cantons of Geneva and Vaud have a collaboration programme named Métropole lémanique.

== See also ==
- Suisse romande
- Health Valley
