= Eastern Switzerland =

Coordinates: 47.3°N 9.3°E

Eastern Switzerland Ostschweiz (in German) Suisse orientale (in French) Svizra orientala (in Romansh) Svizzera orientale (in Italian)
- Region
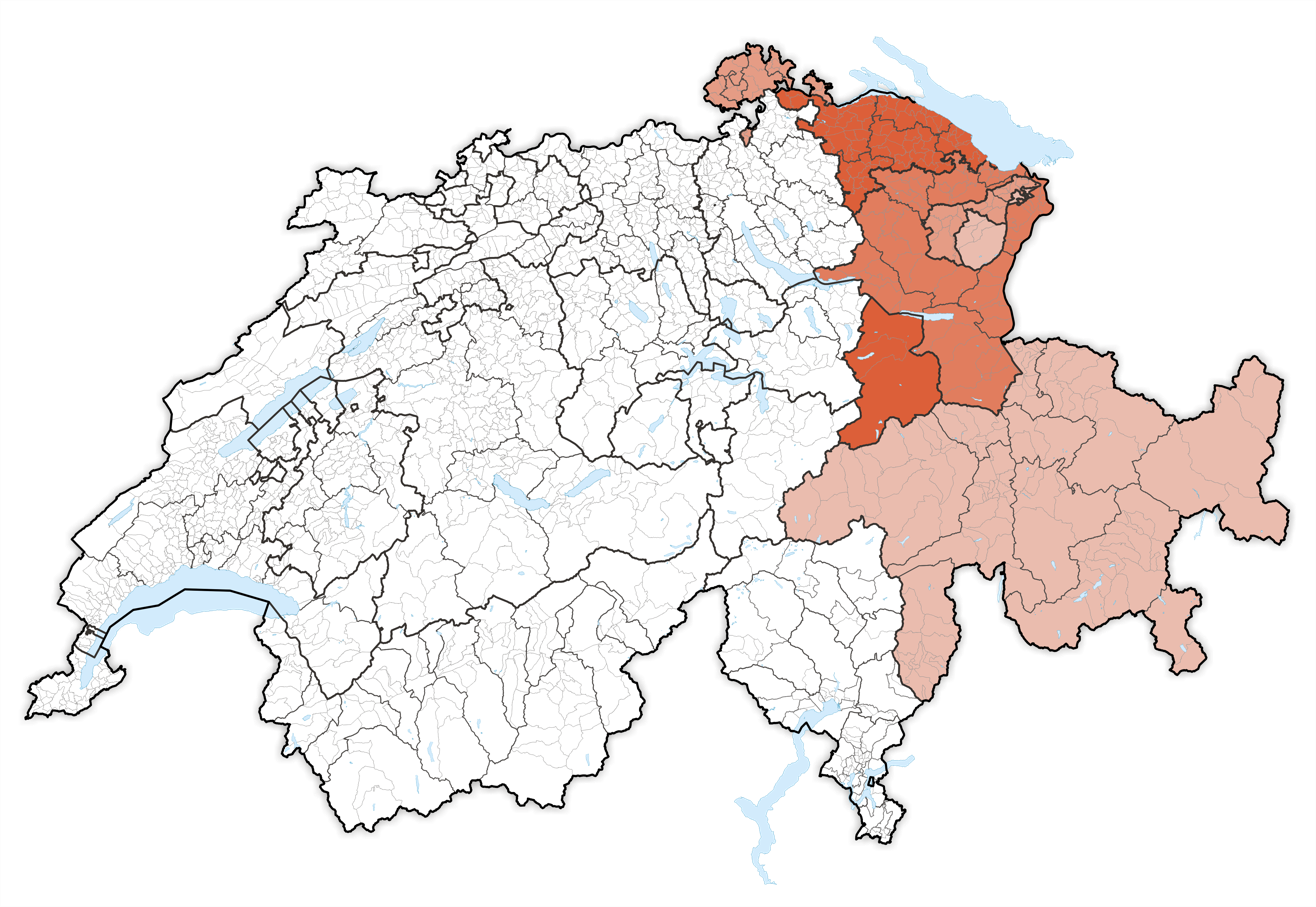
- Country: Switzerland

Area
  - Total: 11,521.0 km^{2} (4,448.3 sq mi)

Population (2007)
  - Total: 1,069,600
  - Density: 92.839/km^{2} (240.45/sq mi)

GDP
  - Total: CHF 81.528 billion (2022)
- NUTS code: CH05
- HDI (2022): 0.949 very high · 7th

Eastern Switzerland (German: Ostschweiz, French: Suisse orientale, Romansh: Svizra orientala, Italian: Svizzera orientale) is the common name of the region situated to the east of Glarus Alps, with the cantons of Schaffhausen, Thurgau, St. Gallen, Appenzell Ausserrhoden, Appenzell Innerrhoden, and Glarus. The north of canton of Grisons (Graubünden), with the city of Chur, is usually considered to be part of Eastern Switzerland as well.

Eastern Switzerland is also defined as one of the NUTS-2 regions of Switzerland. In this case, it includes the cantons of Appenzell Ausserrhoden, Appenzell Innerrhoden, Glarus, Grisons, Schaffhausen, St. Gallen, and Thurgau.

The region is mostly mountainous, overlapping with the Alps (Appenzell Alps, Glarus Alps) and Table Jura (Randen). It also includes the eastern part of the Swiss Plateau. It borders Lake Constance and includes Lake Walen.

Regional rail transport in Eastern Switzerland is for the most part covered by the St. Gallen S-Bahn, with some regions being covered by the S-Bahn networks of Chur, Schaffhausen and Zurich.
