= Cantons of Switzerland =

Member states of the Swiss Confederation

Swiss cantons: Schweizer Kantone (German); Cantons suisses (French); Cantoni svizzeri (Italian); Chantuns svizras (Romansh)
- Also known as: Stände, États, Stati
- Category: Federated state
- Location: Switzerland
- Found in: Regions
- Created: 13th century
- Number: 26 cantons (as of 2026)
- Populations: 16,003 (Appenzell Innerrhoden) – 1,487,969 (Canton of Zürich)
- Areas: 37 km^{2} (14 sq mi) – 7,105 km^{2} (2,743 sq mi)
- Government: List of cantonal executives of Switzerland
- Subdivisions: Districts and municipalities

The 26 cantons of Switzerland (Note: (German: Kanton [kanˈtoːn]; French: canton [kɑ̃tɔ̃]; Italian: cantone [kanˈtoːne]; Sursilvan and Surmiran: cantun; Vallader and Puter: Chantun; Sutsilvan: cantùn; Rumantsch Grischun: chantun)) are the member states of the Swiss Confederation. The nucleus of the Swiss Confederacy in the form of the first three confederate allies used to be referred to as the Waldstätte. Two important periods in the development of the Old Swiss Confederacy are summarized by the terms Acht Orte ('Eight Cantons'; from 1353 to 1481) and Dreizehn Orte ('Thirteen Cantons', from 1513 to 1798).

Each canton of the Old Swiss Confederacy, formerly also Ort ('lieu/locality', from before 1450), or Stand ('estate', from c. 1550), was a fully sovereign state with its own border controls, army, and currency from at least the Treaty of Westphalia (1648) until the establishment of the Swiss federal state in 1848, with a brief period of centralised government during the Helvetic Republic (1798–1803). The term Kanton has been widely used since the 19th century.

The number of cantons was increased to 19 with the Act of Mediation (1803), with the recognition of former subject territories as full cantons. The Federal Treaty of 1815 increased the number to 22 due to the accession of former associates of the Old Swiss Confederacy. The canton of Jura acceded as the 23rd canton with its secession from Bern in 1979. The official number of cantons was increased to 26 in the federal constitution of 1999, which designated former half-cantons as cantons.

The areas of the cantons vary from 37 km^{2} (15 sq. mi.) (Basel-Stadt) to 7,105 km^{2} (2743 sq. mi.) (Grisons); the populations (as of 2018) range from 16,000 (Appenzell Innerrhoden) to 1.5 million (Zürich).

== Terminology ==
The term canton, now also used as the English term for administrative subdivisions of other countries, originates in French usage in the late 15th century (recorded in Fribourg in 1467), from a word for "edge, corner", at the time the literal translation of Early Modern High German Ort. After 1490, canton was increasingly used in French and Italian documents to refer to the members of the Swiss Confederacy. English use of canton in reference to the Swiss Confederacy (as opposed to the heraldic sense) dates to the early 17th century.

In the Old Swiss Confederacy, the term Ort (plural: Orte) was in use from the early 15th century as a generic term for the member cantons. The founding cantons specifically were also known as Waldstätte 'forest settlements' (singular: Waldstatt). The formulaic Stette und Waldstette for the members of the early confederacy is recorded in the mid-14th century, used interchangeably with Stett und Lender ('cities and lands', 'city cantons and rural cantons') until the late 15th century. Ort was increasingly replaced by Stand (plural: Stände) 'estate' about 1550, a term taken to imply liberty and sovereignty. Abolished in the Helvetic Republic, the term 'Stand' was revived in 1815 and remains in use today.

The French term canton adopted into German after 1648, and then only in occasional use until the early 19th century: prominent usage of Ort and Stand gradually disappeared in German-speaking Switzerland from the time of the Helvetic Republic. Only with the Act of Mediation of 1803 did German Kanton become an official designation, retained in the Swiss Constitution of 1848.

The term Stand (French: état, Italian: stato) remains in synonymous usage and is reflected in the name of the upper chamber of the Swiss Parliament, the Council of States (German: Ständerat, French: Conseil des États, Italian: Consiglio degli Stati, Romansh: Cussegl dals Stadis).

In the modern era, since Neuchâtel ceased to be a principality in 1848, all Swiss cantons can be considered to have a republican form of government. Some cantons formally describe themselves as republics in their constitutions. This applies to the Romance-speaking cantons in particular: Geneva (formally République et canton de Genève, 'Republic and canton of Geneva'), Jura, Neuchâtel, Valais, Vaud and Ticino.

== History ==
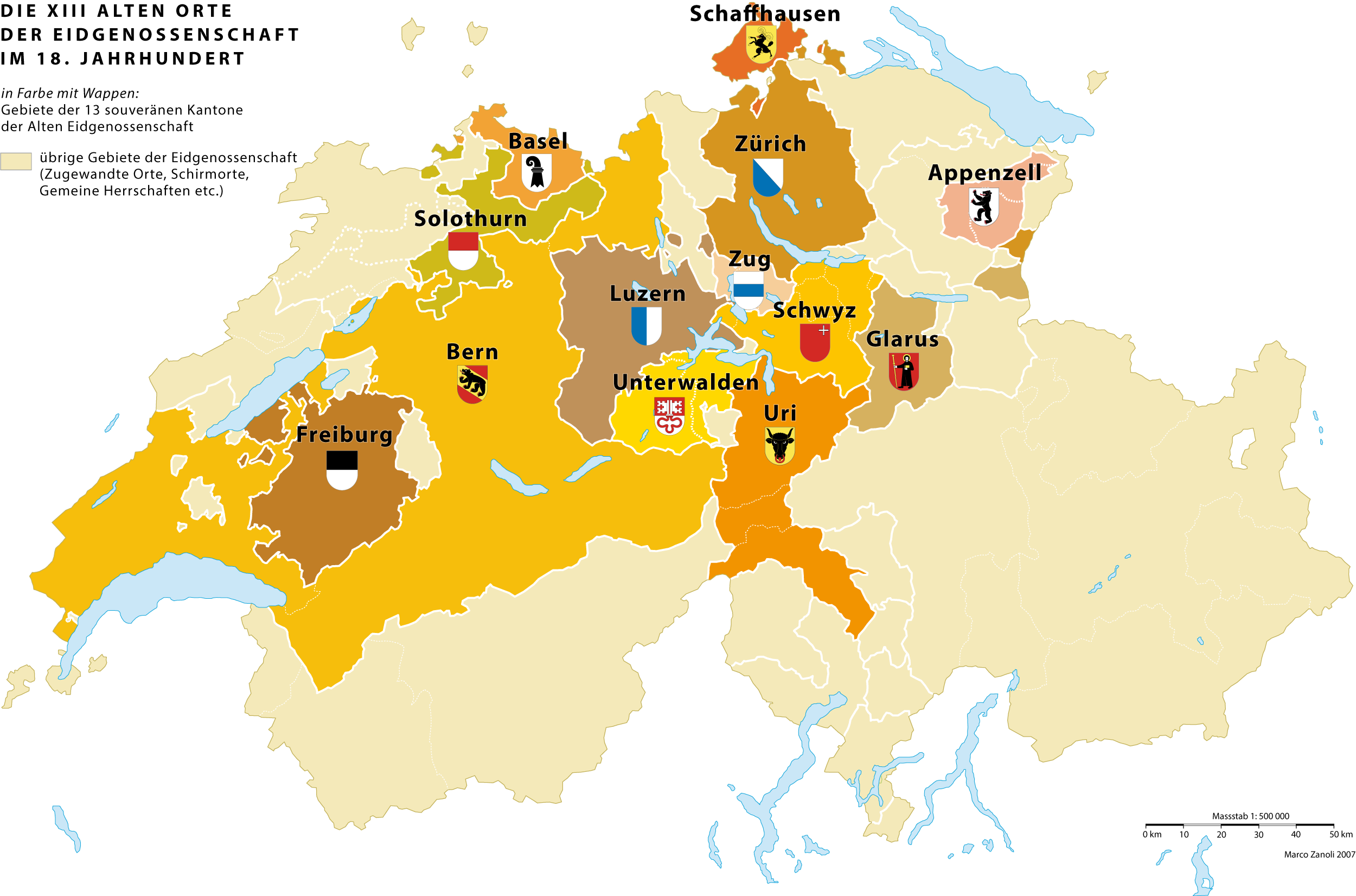
The "Thirteen-Canton Confederation" of the Old Swiss Confederacy (1513–1798)

In the 16th century, the Old Swiss Confederacy was composed of 13 sovereign confederate allies (the Thirteen Cantons; German: Die Dreizehn Alten Orte), and there were two different kinds: five rural states (German: Länder) – Uri, Schwyz (which became eponymous of the confederacy), Unterwalden, Glarus, Appenzell – and eight urban states (German: Städte) – Zürich, Bern, Luzern, Zug, Basel, Fribourg, Solothurn, Schaffhausen.

Though they were technically part of the Holy Roman Empire, they had become de facto independent when the Swiss defeated Emperor Maximilian I in 1499 in Dornach.

In the early modern period, the individual confederate allies came to be seen as republics; while the six traditional allies had a tradition of direct democracy in the form of the Landsgemeinde, the urban states operated via representation in city councils, de facto oligarchic systems dominated by families of the patriciate. (Note: Zug was the exception in this, in being an urban state and still holding a Landsgemeinde.)

The old system was abandoned with the formation of the Helvetic Republic following the French invasion of Switzerland in 1798. The cantons of the Helvetic Republic had merely the status of an administrative subdivision with no sovereignty. The Helvetic Republic collapsed within five years, and cantonal sovereignty was restored with the Act of Mediation of 1803. The status of Switzerland as a federation of states was restored, at the time including 19 cantons (the six accessions to the early modern Thirteen Cantons being composed of former associates and subject territories: St. Gallen, Grisons, Aargau, Thurgau, Ticino, Vaud). Three additional western cantons, Valais, Neuchâtel and Geneva, acceded in 1815.

The process of "Restoration", completed by 1830, returned most of the former feudal rights to the cantonal patriciates, leading to rebellions among the rural population. The Radicals embodied these democratic forces calling for a new federal constitution. This tension, paired with religious issues ("Jesuit question") escalated into armed conflict in the 1840s, with the brief Sonderbund War. The victory of the Liberal-Radicals resulted in the formation of Switzerland as a federal state in 1848. The cantons retained far-reaching sovereignty but were no longer allowed to maintain individual standing armies or international relations. As the revolutions of 1848 in Western Europe had failed elsewhere, Switzerland during the later 19th century (and with the exception of the French Third Republic, until the end of World War I) found itself as an isolated democratic republic, surrounded by the restored monarchies of France, Italy, Austria-Hungary and Germany.

== Constitutions and powers ==
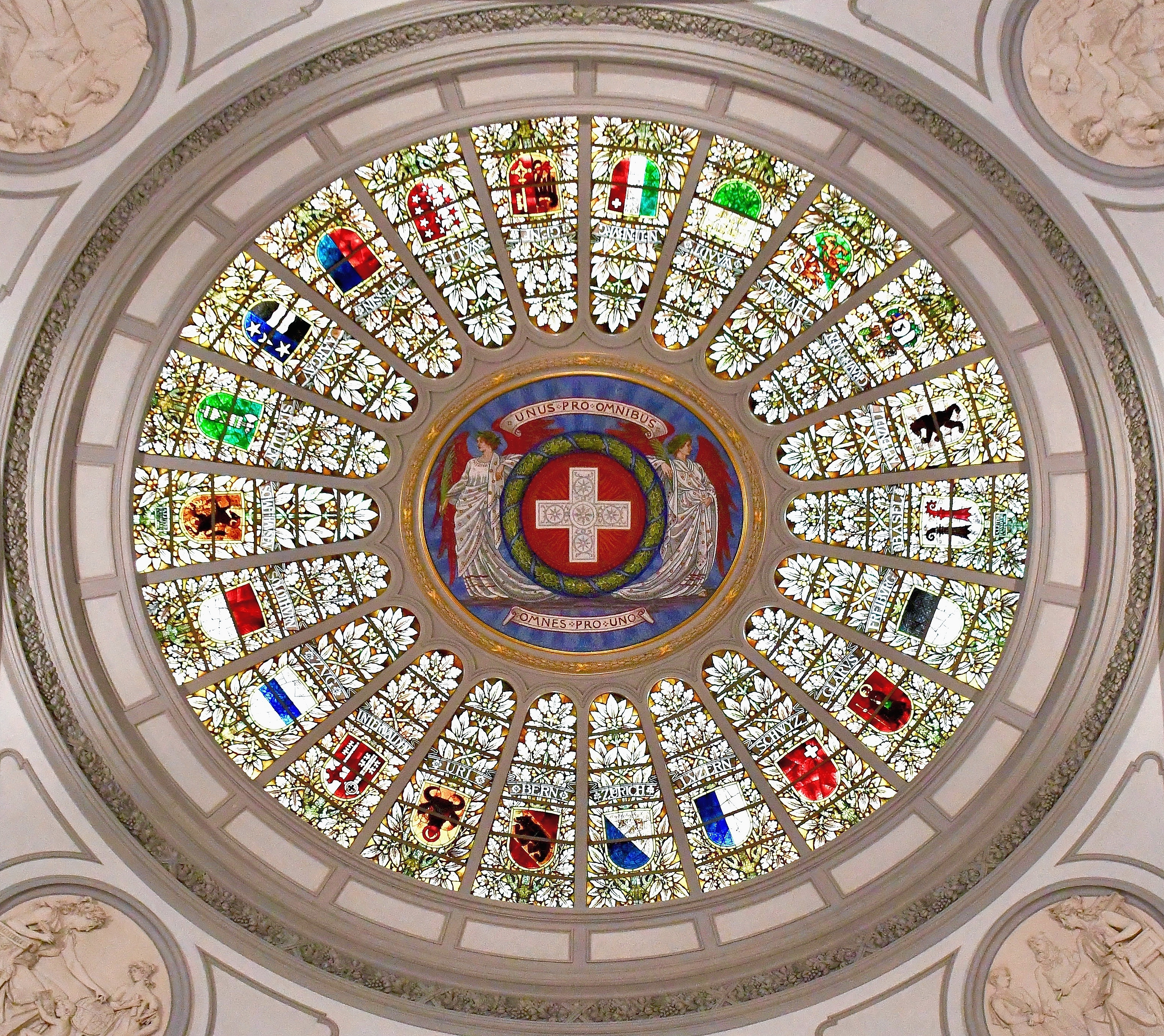
The 22 cantonal coats of arms (all but Jura, with the half-cantons represented jointly) in stained glass set in the dome of the Federal Palace of Switzerland (c. 1900)

The Swiss Federal Constitution declares the cantons to be sovereign to the extent that their sovereignty is not limited by federal law. Areas specifically reserved to the Confederation include the armed forces, currency, postal service, telecommunications, immigration and emigration, the granting of asylum, foreign relations with sovereign states, civil and criminal law, weights and measures, and customs duties.

Each canton has its own constitution, legislature, executive, police and courts. Similar to the Confederation, a directorial system of government is followed by the cantons.

The cantonal legislatures are unicameral parliaments, with their size varying between 58 and 200 seats. A few legislatures also involve or did involve general popular assemblies known as Landsgemeinden; the use of this form of legislature has declined: at present, it exists only in the cantons of Appenzell Innerrhoden and Glarus. The cantonal executives consist of either five or seven members, depending on the canton. For the names of the institutions, see the list of cantonal executives and list of cantonal legislatures.

The cantons retain all powers and competencies not delegated to the Confederation by the federal constitution or law: most significantly the cantons are responsible for healthcare, welfare, law enforcement, public education, and retain the power of taxation. Each canton defines its official language(s). Cantons may conclude treaties not only with other cantons but also with foreign states (respectively Articles 48 and 56 of the Federal Constitution).

The cantonal constitutions determine the internal organisation of the canton, including the degree of autonomy accorded to the municipalities, which varies but almost always includes the power to levy taxes and pass municipal laws; some municipalities have their own police forces.

As at the federal level, all cantons provide for some form of direct democracy. Citizens may demand a popular vote to amend the cantonal constitution or laws or to veto laws or spending bills passed by the parliament. Other than in the instances of general popular assemblies in Appenzell Innerrhoden and Glarus, democratic rights are exercised by secret ballot. The right of foreigners to vote varies by canton, as does whether Swiss citizens living abroad (and registered to vote in a canton) can take part in cantonal voting.

Swiss citizens are citizens of a particular municipality (the place of origin) and the canton in which that municipality is part. Cantons, therefore, have a role in and set requirements for the granting of citizenship (naturalisation), though the process is typically undertaken at a municipal level and is subject to federal law.

Switzerland has only one federal public holiday (1 August); public holidays otherwise vary from canton to canton.

== List ==
The cantons are listed in their order of precedence given in the federal constitution. (Note: This is the order generally used in Swiss official documents. At the head of the list are the three city cantons that were considered preeminent in the Old Swiss Confederacy; the other cantons are listed in order of accession to the Confederation. This traditional order of precedence among the cantons has no practical relevance in the modern federal state, in which the cantons are equal to one another, although it still determines formal precedence among the cantons' officials (see Swiss order of precedence).) This reflects the historical order of precedence of the Eight Cantons in the 15th century, followed by the remaining cantons in the order of their historical accession to the confederacy.

	Arms (Note: Cantonal coats of arms shown with cantonal heraldic colors (Standesfarben). Standesfarben were used to identify the (historical) cantons when the full banner was not available for display, although there is overlap; Unterwalden and Solothurn share the same colours, as do Basel and Appenzell, and with the accession of the modern cantons, Valais and Basel-City, and St. Gallen and Thurgau.)	Code	Name in official language(s)	Name in English	As a Swiss canton since	Capital	GDP (2024) in billion CHF	GDP per capita (2024) in CHF	Population (Note: See references for dates.)	Area (km^{2})	Density (per km^{2}) (Note: Per km^{2}, see References for dates.)	No. munic. (2018)	Official languages
1	Coat of arms of Zürich	ZH	Zürich	Zurich	1351	Zurich	167	103,442	1,553,423	1,729	898	166	German
2	Coat of arms of Bern	BE	Bern; Berne	Bern / Berne	1353	Bern	82	76,747	1,043,132	5,960	175	347	German, French
3	Coat of arms of Luzern	LU	Luzern	Lucerne	1332	Lucerne	35.6	81,675	416,347	1,494	279	83	German
4	Coat of arms of Uri	UR	Uri	Uri	1291 (Note: founding forest-canton, foundation date traditionally given as either 1307, 1304 or 1291 (see Foundation of the Old Swiss Confederacy).)	Altdorf	2.1	55,133	36,819	1,077	34	20	German
5	Coat of arms of Schwyz	SZ	Schwyz	Schwyz	1291	Schwyz	13.3	78,794	162,157	908	179	30	German
6	Coat of arms of Obwalden	OW	Obwalden	Obwalden / Obwald	1291 or 1315 (as part of Unterwalden)	Sarnen	2.7	69,602	38,108	491	78	7	German
7	Coat of arms of Nidwalden	NW	Nidwalden	Nidwalden / Nidwald	1291 (as Unterwalden)	Stans	3.5	76,840	43,520	276	158	11	German
8	Coat of arms of Glarus	GL	Glarus	Glarus	1352	Glarus	2.9	69,822	40,851	685	60	3	German
9	Coat of arms of Zug	ZG	Zug	Zug / Zoug	1352	Zug	42.4	317,725	128,794	239	539	11	German
10	Coat of arms of Fribourg	FR	Fribourg; Freiburg	Fribourg	1481	Fribourg	21.3	61,791	325,496	1,671	195	136	French, German
11	Coat of arms of Solothurn	SO	Solothurn	Solothurn / Soleure	1481	Solothurn	19.8	68,511	277,462	790	351	109	German
12	Coat of arms of Basel-City	BS	Basel-Stadt	Basel-Stadt / Basle-City	1501 (as Basel until 1833/1999)	Basel	60.3	300,128	201,156	37	5,444	3	German
13	Coat of arms of Basel-Country	BL	Basel-Landschaft	Basel-Landschaft / Basle-Country	1501 (as Basel until 1833/1999)	Liestal	24.4	81,193	292,955	518	566	86	German
14	Coat of arms of Schaffhausen	SH	Schaffhausen	Schaffhausen / Schaffhouse	1501	Schaffhausen	13.3	151,492	83,107	298	278	26	German
15	Coat of arms of Appenzell Ausserrhoden	AR	Appenzell Ausserrhoden	Appenzell Ausserrhoden / Appenzell Outer-Rhodes	1513 (as Appenzell until 1597/1999)	Herisau (Note: Seat of government and parliament is Herisau; the seat of the judicial authorities is Trogen.)	3.1	54,542	55,309	243	228	20	German
16	Coat of arms of Appenzell Innerrhoden	AI	Appenzell Innerrhoden	Appenzell Innerrhoden / Appenzell Inner-Rhodes	1513 (as Appenzell until 1597/1999)	Appenzell	1.1	67,414	16,293	172	94	6	German
17	Coat of arms of St. Gallen	SG	St. Gallen	St. Gallen / St Gall	1803 (Note: Act of Mediation; formed out of the Canton of Säntis and the northern half of the Canton of Linth.)	St. Gallen	37	68,688	514,504	2,031	253	77	German
18	Coat of arms of Graubünden	GR	Graubünden; Grischun; Grigioni	Grisons / Graubünden	1803 (Note: Act of Mediation; formerly the Canton of Raetia, comprising the earlier Three Leagues.)	Chur	15.4	74,679	200,096	7,105	28	108	German, Romansh, Italian
19	Coat of arms of Aargau	AG	Aargau	Aargau / Argovia	1803 (Note: Act of Mediation; created from the cantons of Aargau (canton of the Helvetic Republic, from territory previously controlled by Bern) and Baden (previously a Swiss condominium), together with Fricktal (before 1802 not Swiss territory).)	Aarau	46.9	64,013	694,072	1,404	494	212	German
20	Coat of arms of Thurgau	TG	Thurgau	Thurgau / Thurgovia	1803 (Note: Act of Mediation; coterminous with the canton of Thurgau of the Helvetic Republic (1798), formed from the county of Thurgau, a Swiss condominium.)	Frauenfeld (Note: Seat of parliament half-yearly alternates between Frauenfeld and Weinfelden.)	18.5	62,163	282,909	992	285	80	German
21	Coat of arms of Ticino	TI	Ticino	Ticino / Tessin	1803 (Note: Act of Mediation; combining the former cantons of Bellinzona and Lugano; see Ennetbirgische Vogteien.)	Bellinzona	27.9	77,707	350,986	2,812	125	115	Italian
22	Coat of arms of Vaud	VD	Vaud	Vaud	1803 (Note: Act of Mediation, formerly Canton of Léman.)	Lausanne	80.7	94,739	814,762	3,212	254	309	French
23	Coat of arms of Valais	VS	Valais; Wallis	Valais	1815 (Note: Restoration, until 1798 the Prince-bishopric of Sion and the République des Sept-Dizains, briefly annexed by France as Simplon département during 1810–1813.)	Sion	21.8	59,186	348,503	5,224	67	126	French, German
24	Coat of arms of Neuchâtel	NE	Neuchâtel	Neuchâtel	1815/1857 (Note: claimed by Frederick William III of Prussia until the Neuchâtel Crisis of 1856–1857)	Neuchâtel	25.6	142,993	175,894	802	219	31	French
25	Coat of arms of Geneva	GE	Genève	Geneva	1815 (Note: previously an independent republic, annexed by France during 1798–1813.)	Geneva	87.4	165,459	506,343	282	1,792	45	French
26	Coat of arms of Jura	JU	Jura	Jura	1979 (Note: seceded from Bern)	Delémont	5	67,176	73,709	839	88	55	French
-	Coat of arms of Switzerland	CH	Schweizerische Eidgenossenschaft; Confédération suisse; Confederazione Svizzera; Confederaziun svizra	Swiss Confederation	1815/1848 (Note: The Restored Confederacy of 1815 had the modern borders and introduced the modern Swiss coat of arms, but the cantons remained largely sovereign, without a federal government or parliament. The federal constitution of 1848 introduced the Federal Assembly, Federal Council and the notion of federal citizenship.)	(Bern)	861		8,670,300	41,291	210	2,222	German, French, Italian, Romansh

The two-letter abbreviations for Swiss cantons are widely used, e.g. on car license plates. They are also used in the ISO 3166-2 codes of Switzerland with the prefix "CH-" (Confœderatio Helvetica — Helvetian Confederation — Helvetia having been the ancient Roman name of the region). CH-SZ, for example, is used for the canton of Schwyz.

== Half-cantons ==
Six of the 26 cantons are traditionally, but no longer officially, called "half-cantons" (German: Halbkanton, French: demi-canton, Italian: semicantone, Romansh: mez-chantun). In two instances (Basel and Appenzell) this was a consequence of a historic division, whilst in the case of Unterwalden a historic mutual association, resulting in three pairs of half-cantons. The other 20 cantons were, and in some instances still are—though only in a context where it is needed to distinguish them from any half-cantons—typically termed "full" cantons in English.

The first article of the 1848 and 1874 constitutions constituted the Confederation as the union of "twenty-two sovereign cantons", referring to the half-cantons as "Unterwalden (ob und nid dem Wald ['above and beneath the woods'])", "Basel (Stadt und Landschaft ['city and country'])" and "Appenzell (beider Rhoden ['both Rhoden'])". The 1874 constitution was amended to list 23 cantons with the accession of the Canton of Jura in 1978.

The historic half-cantons, and their pairings, are still recognizable in the first article of the Swiss Federal Constitution of 1999 by being joined to their other "half" with the conjunction "and":

The People and the cantons of Zurich, Bern, Lucerne, Uri, Schwyz, Obwalden and Nidwalden, Glarus, Zug, Fribourg, Solothurn, Basel-Stadt and Basel-Landschaft, Schaffhausen, Appenzell Ausserrhoden and Appenzell Innerrhoden, St. Gallen, Graubünden, Aargau, Thurgau, Ticino, Vaud, Valais, Neuchâtel, Geneva, and Jura form the Swiss Confederation.

— Article 1 of the Federal Constitution of the Swiss Confederation

The 1999 constitutional revision retained the traditional distinction, on the request of the six cantonal governments, as a way to mark the historic association of the half-cantons to each other. While the older constitutions referred to these states as "half-cantons", a term that remains in popular use, the 1999 revision and official terminology since then use the appellation "cantons with half of a cantonal vote".

The 1/2, 1 and 2 francs coins as minted since 1874 represent the number of cantons by 22 stars surrounding the figure of Helvetia on the obverse. The design of the coins was altered to show 23 stars, including Jura, beginning with the 1983 batch. The design has remained unchanged since, and does not reflect the official number of "26 cantons" introduced in 1999.

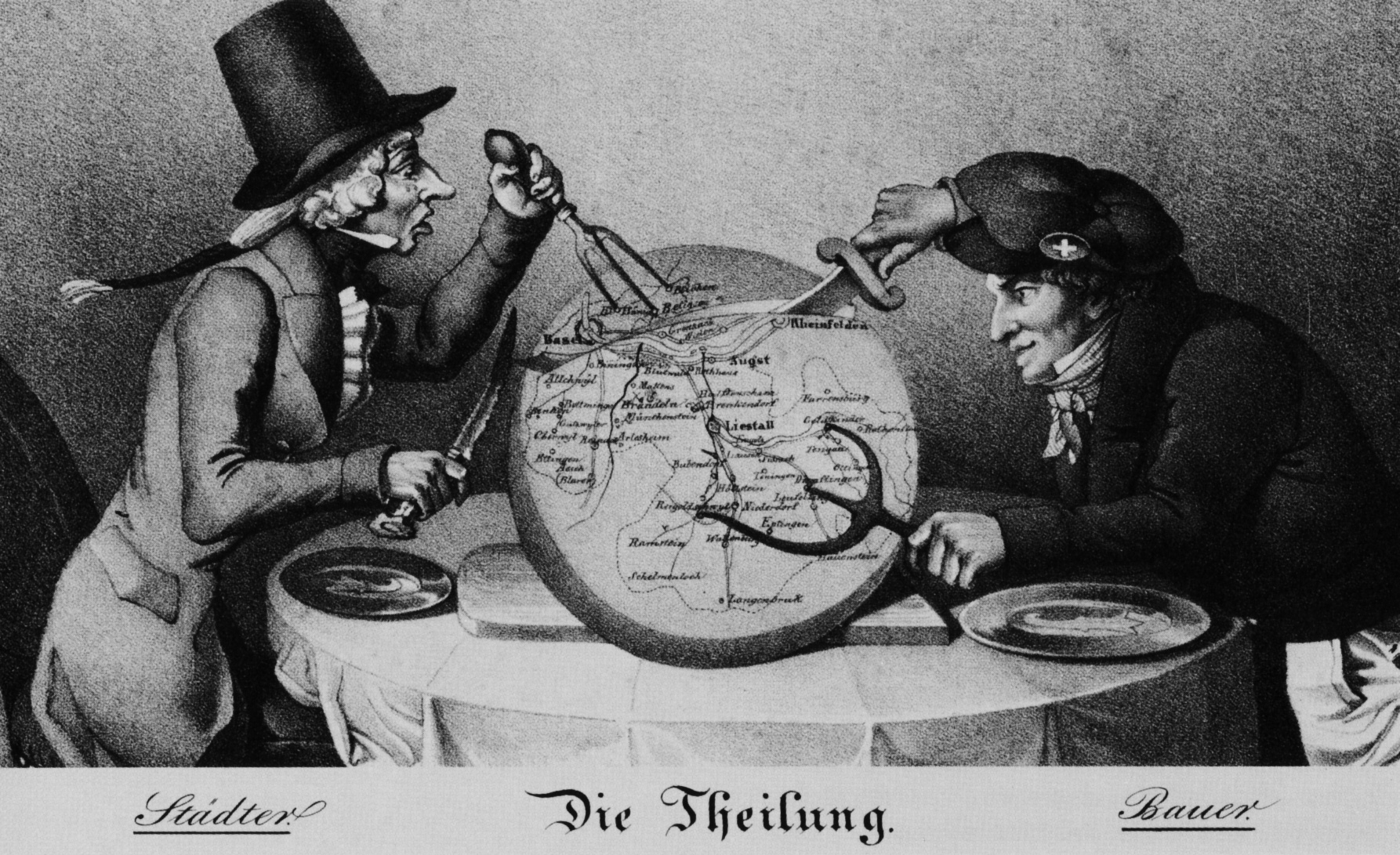
Caricature of the division of Basel, 1833

The reasons for the existence of the three pairs of half-cantons are varied:

- Unterwalden never consisted of a single unified jurisdiction. Originally, Obwalden, Nidwalden, and the Abbey of Engelberg formed distinct communities. The collective term Unterwalden remains in use, however, for the area that partook in the creation of the original Swiss confederation in 1291 with Uri and Schwyz. The Federal Charter of 1291 called for representatives from each of the three "areas".
- The historical canton of Appenzell divided itself into "inner" and "outer" halves as a consequence of the Reformation in Switzerland in 1597: Appenzell Innerrhoden (Catholic) and Appenzell Ausserrhoden (Protestant).
- The historical canton of Basel was divided in 1833 after the Basel countryside (which became the canton of Basel-Landschaft) declared its independence from the city of Basel (which became the canton of Basel-Stadt), following a period of protest and armed conflict about the under-representation of the more populous countryside in the canton's political system.

With their original circumstances of partition now a historical matter, the half-cantons are since 1848 equal to the other cantons in all but two respects:

- They elect only one member of the Council of States instead of two (Cst. art. 150 par. 2). This means there are a total of 46 seats in the council.
- In popular referendums about constitutional amendments, which require for adoption a national popular majority as well as the assent of a majority of the cantons (Ständemehr / majorité des cantons), the result of the half-cantons' popular vote counts only one half of that of the other cantons (Cst. arts. 140, 142). This means that for purposes of a constitutional referendum, at least 12 out of a total of 23 cantonal popular votes must support the amendment.

Between 1831 and 1833 the canton of Schwyz was divided into half-cantons: (Inner) Schwyz and the break-away Outer Schwyz; in this instance, the half-cantons were forced by the Confederation to settle their disputes and reunite.

In the 20th century, some Jura separatists suggested a new canton of Jura to be divided into half-cantons of North Jura and South Jura. Instead, North Jura became the (full) canton of Jura while South Jura remains in the canton of Bern as the region of Bernese Jura.

== Names in national languages ==
The name of each canton in its own official language is shown in bold.

Abbr	English (Note: The most commonly used forms in English are mostly adopted from either French or German; in some cases, there may have been a historical shift in preference, e.g. from the French form Berne to the German form Bern; in individual cases, the Latin form may be current, certainly in the case of Geneva and arguably for Argovia, Thurgovia. Actual anglicized forms have been used, for example Basle.)	German	French	Italian	Romansh
AG	Aargau; Argovia	**Aargau**	Argovie	Argovia	**Argovia**
AI	Appenzell Innerrhoden; Appenzell Inner-Rhodes	**Appenzell Innerrhoden**	Appenzell Rhodes-Intérieures	Appenzello Interno	Appenzell Dadens
AR	Appenzell Ausserrhoden; Appenzell Outer-Rhodes	**Appenzell Ausserrhoden**	Appenzell Rhodes-Extérieures	Appenzello Esterno	Appenzell Dador
BS	Basel-Stadt; Basle-City	**Basel-Stadt**	Bâle-Ville	Basilea Città	Basilea-Citad
BL	Basel-Landschaft; Basle-Country	**Basel-Landschaft**	Bâle-Campagne	Basilea Campagna	Basilea-Champagna
BE	Bern; Berne	**Bern**	**Berne**	Berna	Berna
FR	Fribourg; Friburg	**Freiburg**	**Fribourg**	Friburgo	Friburg
GE	Genève; Geneva	Genf	**Genève**	Ginevra	Genevra
GL	Glarus; Glaris	**Glarus**	Glaris	Glarona	Glaruna
GR	Grisons; Graubünden	**Graubünden**	Grisons	**Grigioni**	**Grischun**
JU	Jura	Jura	**Jura**	Giura	Giura
LU	Lucerne	**Luzern**	Lucerne	Lucerna	Lucerna
NE	Neuchâtel	Neuenburg	**Neuchâtel**	Neuchâtel	Neuchâtel
NW	Nidwalden; Nidwald	**Nidwalden**	Nidwald	Nidvaldo	Sutsilvania
OW	Obwalden; Obwald	**Obwalden**	Obwald	Obvaldo	Sursilvania
SH	Schaffhausen; Schaffhouse	**Schaffhausen**	Schaffhouse	Sciaffusa	Schaffusa
SZ	Schwyz	**Schwyz**	Schwyz (or Schwytz)	Svitto	Sviz
SO	Solothurn; Soleure	**Solothurn**	Soleure	Soletta	Soloturn
SG	St. Gallen; St Gall	**St. Gallen**	Saint-Gall	San Gallo	Son Gagl
TG	Thurgau; Thurgovia	**Thurgau**	Thurgovie	Turgovia	Turgovia
TI	Ticino; Tessin	Tessin	Tessin	**Ticino**	Tessin
UR	Uri	**Uri**	Uri	Uri	Uri
VS	Valais; Wallis	**Wallis**	**Valais**	Vallese	Vallais
VD	Vaud	Waadt	**Vaud**	Vaud	Vad
ZG	Zug; Zoug	**Zug**	Zoug	Zugo	Zug
ZH	Zürich; Zurich	**Zürich**	Zurich	Zurigo	Turitg

== Admission of new cantons ==
The enlargement of Switzerland by way of the admission of new cantons ended in 1815. The latest formal attempt considered by Switzerland was in 1919 from Vorarlberg but subsequently rejected. A few representatives submitted in 2010 a parliamentary motion to consider enlargement although it was widely seen as anti-EU rhetoric rather than a serious proposal. The motion was eventually dropped and not even examined by the parliament.

== See also ==
- Cantonal bank
- Cantonal police
- Data codes for Switzerland § Cantons
- Flags and arms of cantons of Switzerland
- List of Swiss cantons by GDP
- List of cantons of Switzerland by elevation
- Spatial planning in Switzerland
