= Arnold Winkelried of Unterwalden =

There are at least five historical people of Unterwalden called Arnold Winkelried.

- the first recorded man with this name is sometimes identified with Arnold von Winkelried of Swiss patriotic legend
- Arnold Winkelried (mercenary leader) (died 1522)
