= Battle of Sempach =

Part of the expansion of the Swiss Confederation

Coordinates: 47°08′44″N 8°12′48″E

- Part of the expansion of the Swiss Confederation
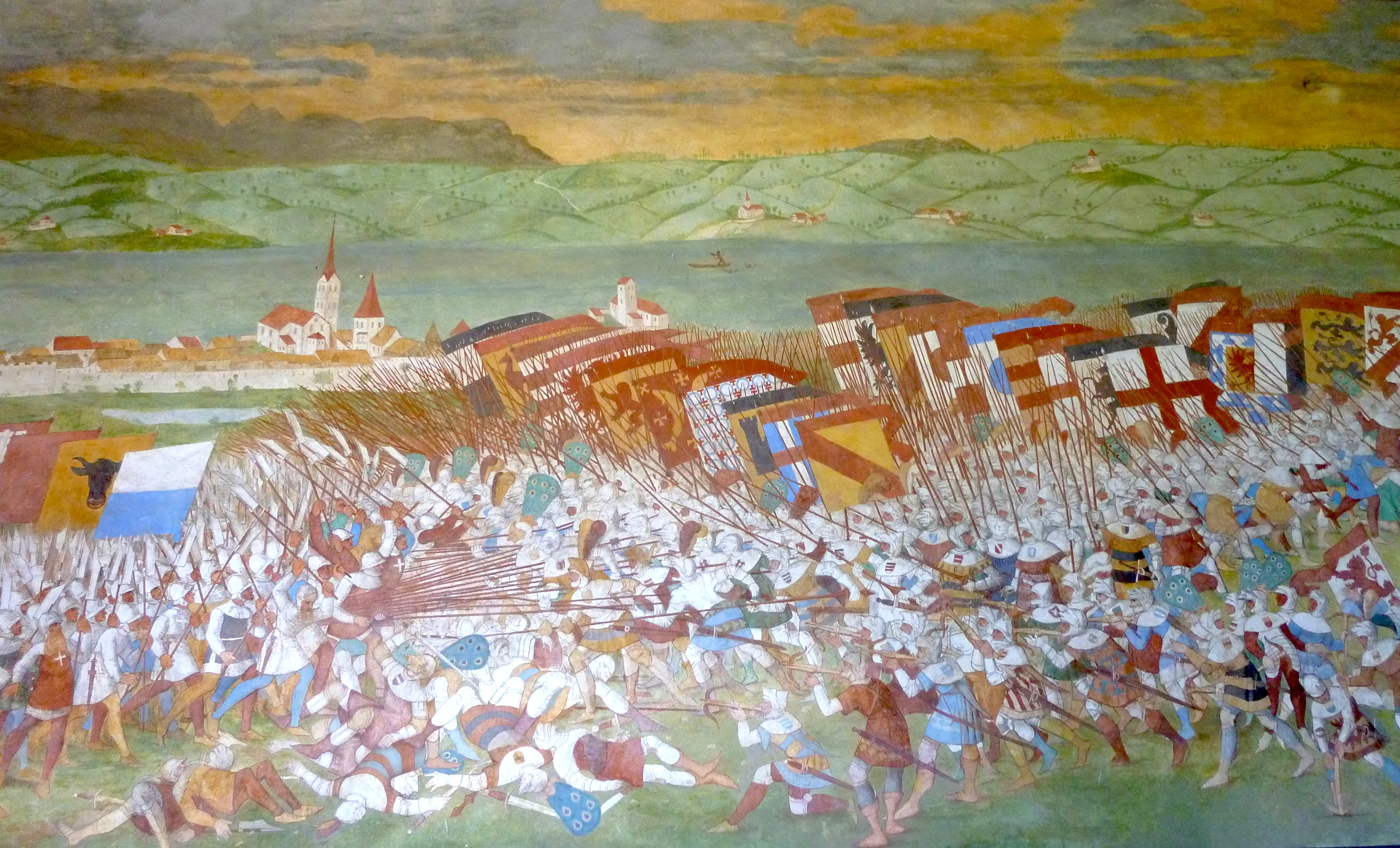
- The battle scene in the fresco in the battle chapel at Sempach. 1886 restoration of a 17th-century painting, which was in turn based on a 16th-century work.
Date	9 July 1386
Location	near Sempach
Result	Swiss victory

Belligerents
Old Swiss Confederacy; (Canton of Lucerne) Lucerne; (Canton of Uri) Uri; (Canton of Schwyz) Schwyz; Unterwalden	Duchy of Austria

Commanders and leaders
Petermann von Gundoldingen †	Leopold III, Duke of Austria †; Johann von Ochsenstein †; Johann von Waldburg †

Strength
c. 1,000 – 1,500	c. (Austria) 4,000, including 1,500 knights

Casualties and losses
c. 200-600	c. (Austria) 1,500, among them c. 400 noblemen

The Battle of Sempach was fought on 9 July 1386, between Leopold III, Duke of Austria and the Old Swiss Confederacy. The battle was a decisive Swiss victory in which Duke Leopold and numerous Austrian nobles died. The victory helped turn the loosely allied Swiss Confederation into a more unified nation and is seen as a turning point in the growth of Switzerland.

== Background ==
During 1383 and 1384, the expansion of the Old Swiss Confederacy collided with Austrian interests. The interests of Austria were further undermined in the Pact of Constance, a union of Zürich, Zug, Solothurn and 51 cities of Swabia. In 1385, there were various attacks, without formal declaration of war or central organization, by forces of Zürich, Zug and Lucerne on the Austrian strongholds of Rapperswil, Rothenburg, Cham and Wolhusen.

In 1384, the people of Entlebuch receive the Lucerne citizenry and on Epiphany, on 6 January 1386, Lucerne expanded its sphere of influence by providing the same right also to the people of Sempach. Lucerne entered further pacts with a number of towns and valleys under Austrian control, including Meienberg, Reichensee and Willisau. These moves were the immediate cause of war. On 14 January, Lucerne called on the confederates for assistance. A local Austrian force defeated the confederate garrison at Meienberg on 28 January, killing over 140 Swiss soldiers. An armistice was called on 21 February, and negotiations were held in Zürich. Neither side had any real interest in ending the conflict at this point, and as the armistice ended, the dispute escalated into a full-scale military confrontation.

Duke Leopold gathered his troops at Brugg, consisting of his feudal vassals from Swabia, the Alsace, and Tyrol, as well as troops from Burgundy, Milan, and even England. In the course of a few weeks, no less than 167 noblemen, both secular and of the church, declared war on the Swiss. These declarations were sent to the Swiss diet in 20 packets, in order to increase the effect of shock. On 24 June, a messenger from Württemberg brought 15 declarations of war. Before all letters had been read, the messenger from Pfirt delivered another eight, and before he had finished speaking, letters from the lords of Schaffhausen were brought in. Another eight messengers arrived on the following day.

The gathering of Austrian forces at Brugg suggested an intended attack on Zürich, and the confederate forces moved to protect that city. But Leopold marched south, to Zofingen and on to Willisau, ostensibly with the intention of ravaging the Lucerne countryside and perhaps, ultimately, aiming for the city of Lucerne. The Austrian army had a troop of mowers with them to cut the crops and destroy the harvests along their route. The town of Willisau was plundered and burned, and the army moved on to Sursee on Lake Sempach, and then towards Sempach on 9 July.

Leopold's men taunted those behind the walls of the town, and a knight waved a noose at them and promised them he would use it on their leaders. Another mockingly pointed to the soldiers setting fire to the ripe fields of grain, and asked them to send a breakfast to the reapers. From behind the walls, there was a shouted retort: "Lucerne and the allies will bring them breakfast!"

Confederate troops of Lucerne, Uri, Schwyz and Unterwalden had marched back from Zürich once it became clear that this was not Leopold's target. The forces of Zürich had remained behind defending their own city, while those of Bern had not heeded the confederate call for assistance.

== Battle ==
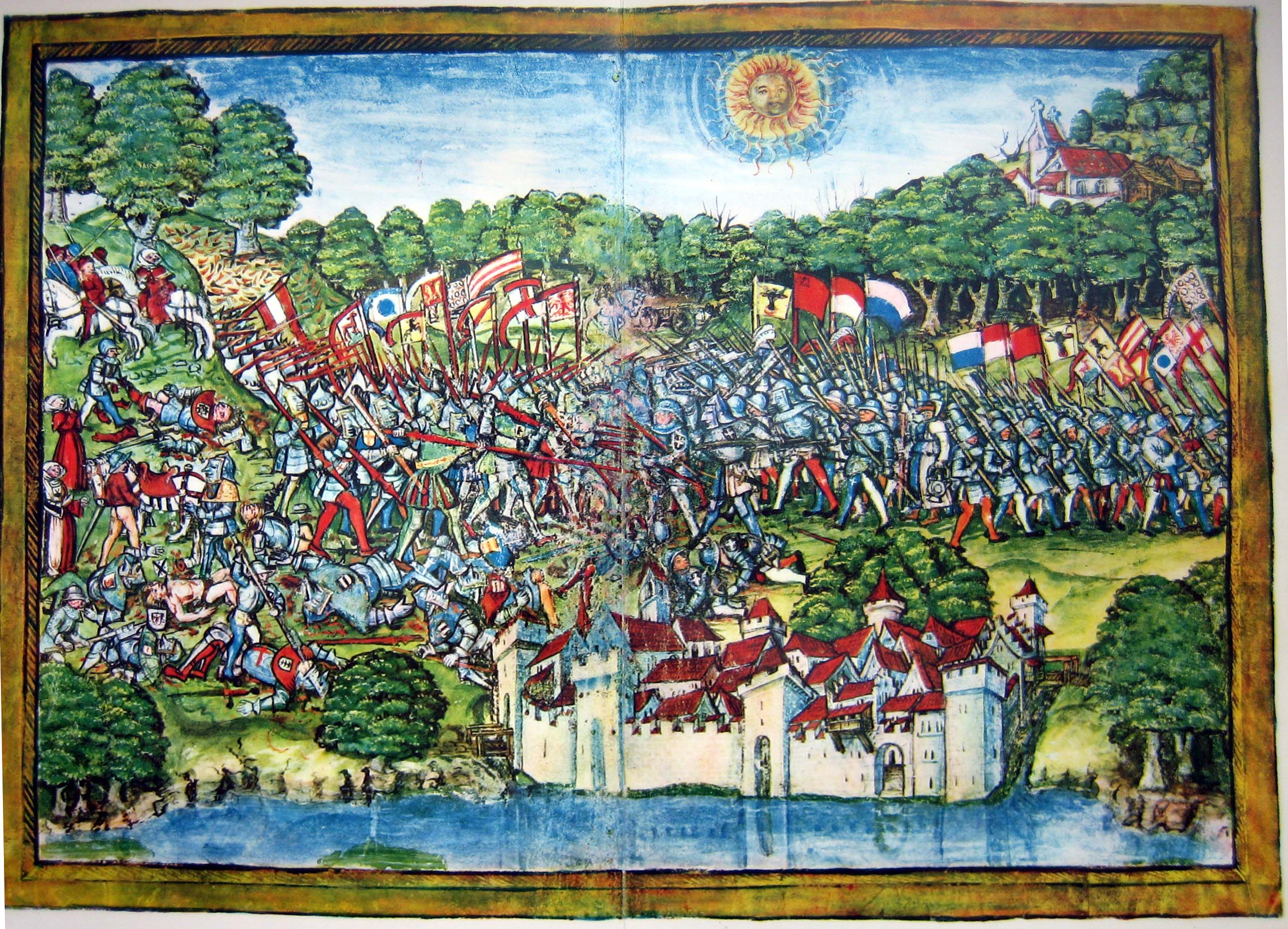
Depiction of the battle in the Luzerner Schilling (1513)

The Confederation army had presumably assembled at the bridge over the Reuss River at Gisikon. It marched from there, hoping to catch Leopold still at Sempach where he could be pressed against the lake. Around noon, the two armies made contact about 2 km outside of Sempach. This was to the mutual surprise of both armies, which were both on the move and not in battle order. But both sides were willing to engage and formed ranks. The site of the battle is marked by the old battle chapel, which was originally consecrated in the year after the battle.

The Swiss held the wooded high ground close to the village of Hildisrieden. Since the terrain was not deemed suitable for a cavalry attack, Leopold's knights dismounted, and because they did not have time to prepare for the engagement, they were forced to cut off the tips of their poulaines which would have hindered their movement on foot. The Swiss chroniclers report how a huge pile of these shoe-tips was found after the battle, and they are also depicted in the background of the battle scene in the Lucerne Chronicle of 1513.

The main body of the Confederation army finally completed its deployment from the marching column, formed up, and aggressively attacked the knights from the flank. The Austrian force, however, formed a wide rank and threatened to surround the outnumbered confederates.

How and at what point the battle turned in favour of the confederates is a matter of debate. It has been suggested that an important factor was the midday heat in July, which wore out the Austrian knights wearing heavy armour, much more than the lightly armed confederates (some of whom had reportedly no other "armour" than a wooden plank tied to their left arm as a shield). Another factor may have been an underestimation of the confederates on the part of the nobility. According to the account by Tschudi, seeing the small strength of the confederate force, the nobles were concerned that if they sent the mercenaries in front, as would have been common practice, they might not see any action at all, as the mercenaries would finish the job on their own. Therefore, they insisted on taking the front ranks.

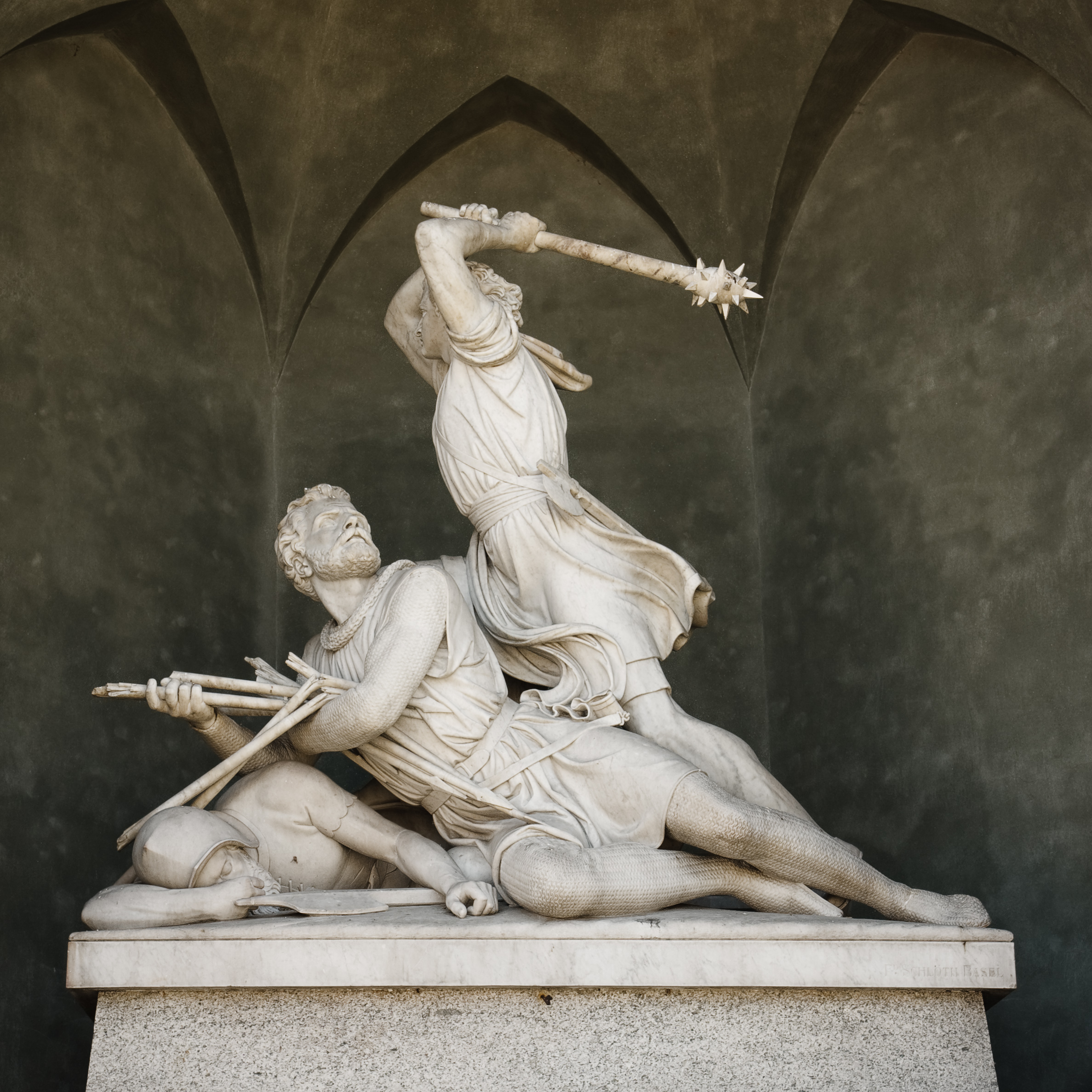
Winkelried-Memorial by Ferdinand Schlöth in Stans

Traditional Swiss historiography since the 16th century has attributed the turning of the tide to the heroic deed of Arnold von Winkelried, who opened a breach in the Habsburg lines by throwing himself into their pikes, taking them down with his body so that the confederates could attack through the opening. Winkelried is usually shown as a legendary figure introduced to explain the Swiss victory against the odds, perhaps as late as a full century after the battle. The earliest evidence of the Winkelried legend is the depiction of the battle in the Lucerne Chronicle of 1513.

As was the custom and a matter of honour in such a battle, each canton had one of their comrades carry their municipal flag in the lead. One such recorded was Rudolf Hön (today's spelling, Höhn, English, Hoehn), who represented Arth, a municipality in the canton of Schwyz. Volunteering to do this meant that he did not carry a weapon, either to defend himself or attack the enemy. Thus, by leading his comrades into battle without a weapon, he diverted the attention of the enemy and sacrificed himself for the intended good of the Confederation. For posterity, and recognition of the actual deed, Hön's name can be seen inscribed twice in the list of fallen on the inner wall of Sempach Battle Chapel (situated next to the battleground). One for being a confederate and the other as a flag bearer.

The oldest accounts of the battle are unambiguous in the judgement that the Swiss victory was against all odds and expectations, and is attributed to the grace of God.

In any case, the Swiss did break through the Austrian ranks and routed the enemy army completely. Duke Leopold, and with him a large number of nobles and knights, were slain, including several members of the noble families of Aarberg, Baldegg, Bechburg, Büttikon, Eptingen, Falkenstein, Hallwil, Reinach, Rotberg and Wetter.
Another prominent casualty was Otto I, Margrave of Baden-Hachberg.

== Aftermath ==
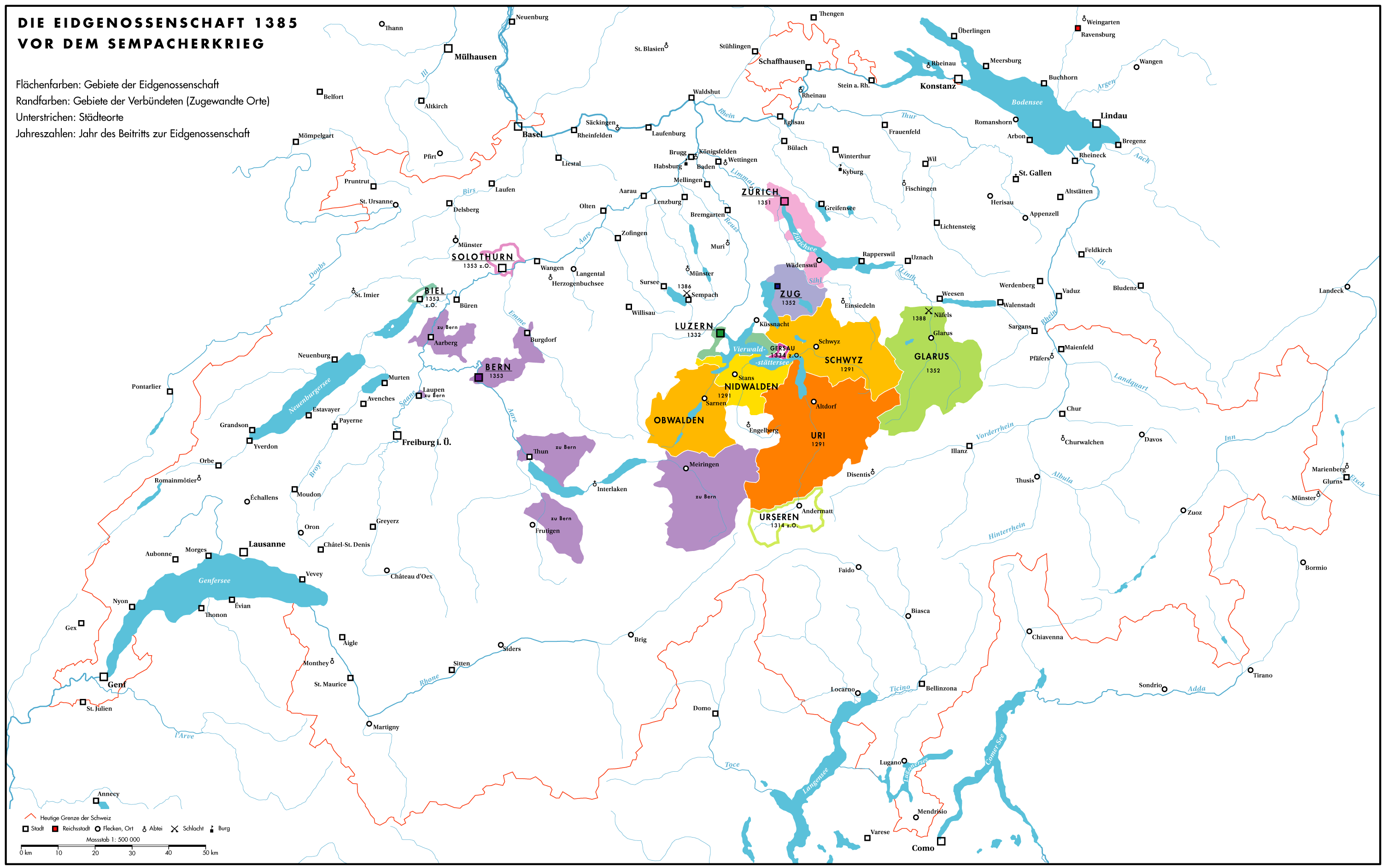
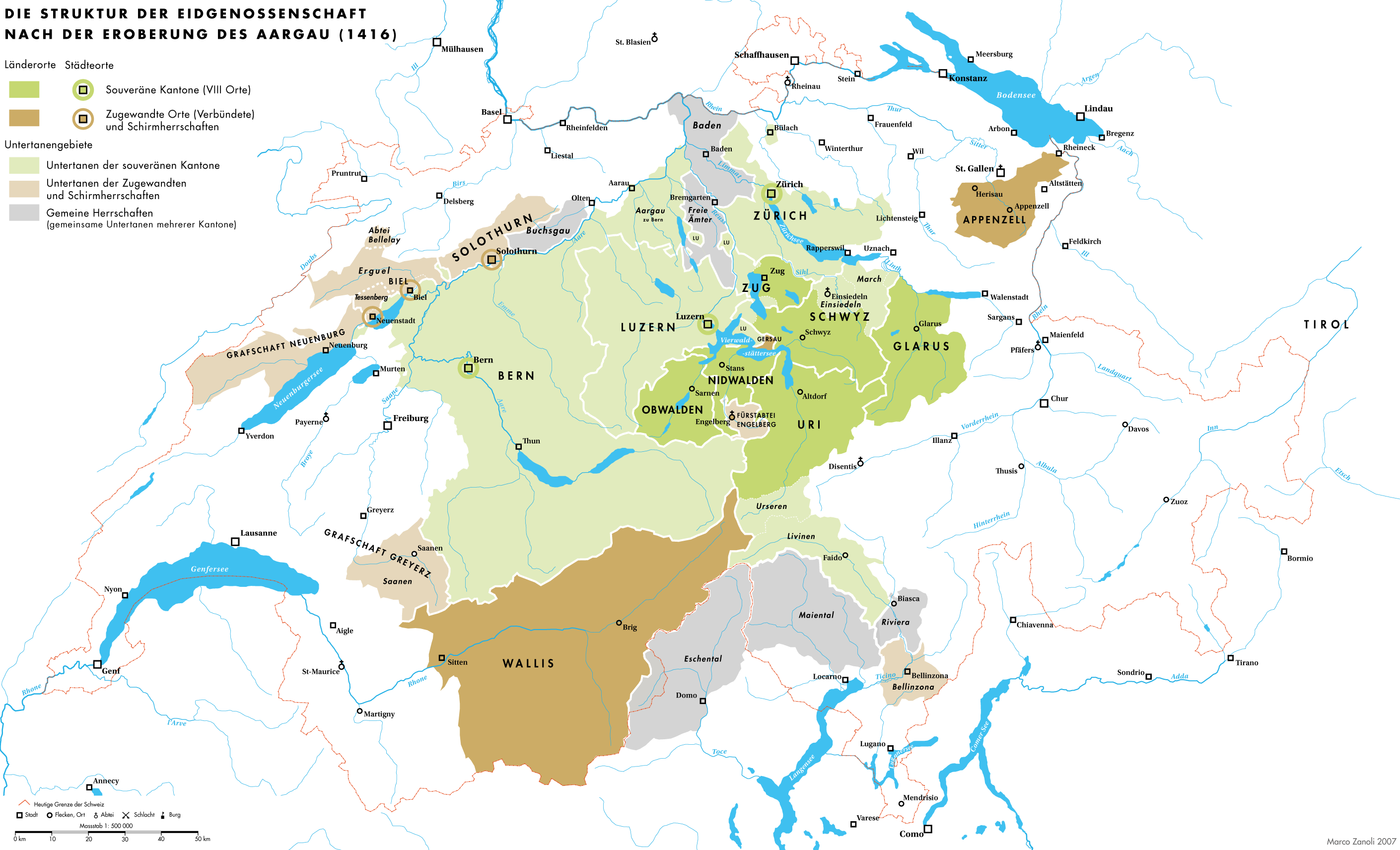
The Swiss Confederacy in 1385 and in 1416

An armistice was agreed upon on 12 October, followed by a peace agreement valid for one year, beginning on 14 January 1387.

The battle was a severe blow to Austrian interests in the region, and allowed for the establishment of Lucerne as a regional capital and further growth of the Old Swiss Confederacy. Already weakened by the 1379 division of Habsburg lands, Leopoldian control of the territories left of the Rhine would collapse over the following years, not least due to the death toll among the local elites loyal to Habsburg. This allowed the confederate cities, especially Lucerne, Bern and Solothurn, an unchecked expansion into the undefended Habsburg lands. Bern, which had not participated in the Sempach war, took the opportunity and began its conquest of what would become the Canton of Bern, sending military expeditions into the cantons of Jura, the Oberland, Emmental and Aargau. Lucerne, by 1389, was able to consolidate its control over the towns around lake Sempach, Willisau and the Entlebuch, largely corresponding to the extent of the modern Canton of Lucerne. Glarus also took the opportunity to rebel against Habsburg control, and established its independence in the Battle of Näfels in 1388. The legend goes that a Bohemian knight received seeds of the flower Calla for his protection when he decided to accompany Duke Leopold. After the battle was lost, the knight hid in a forest, where he was killed. Today, the forest is one of the few places where the Calla is found naturally in Switzerland.

A new peace agreement between the confederacy and Austria was concluded on 1 April 1389, valid for seven years, extended to 20 years on 16 July 1394.

== Legacy ==
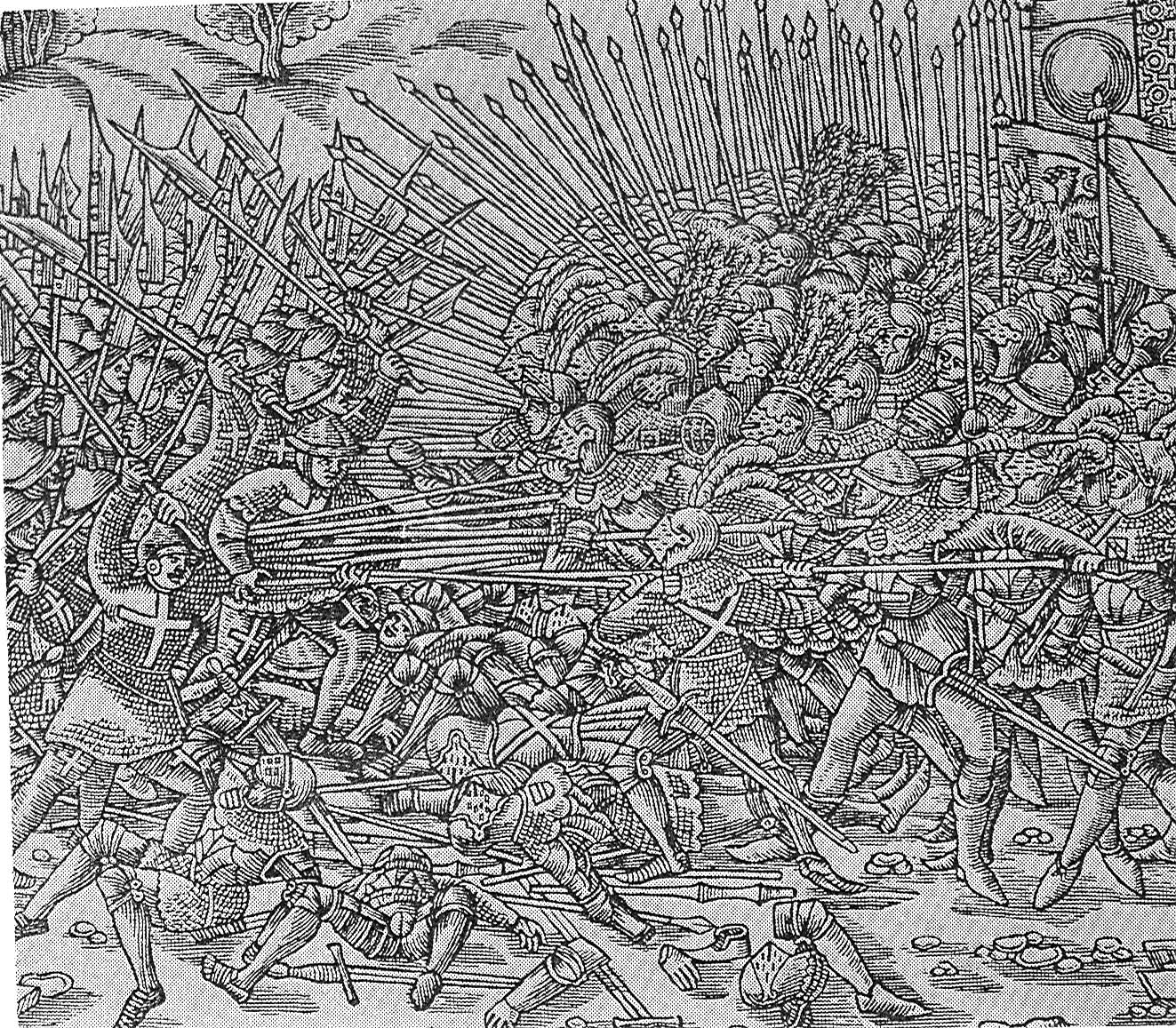
The battle in a woodcut by Niklaus Manuel (d. 1530)

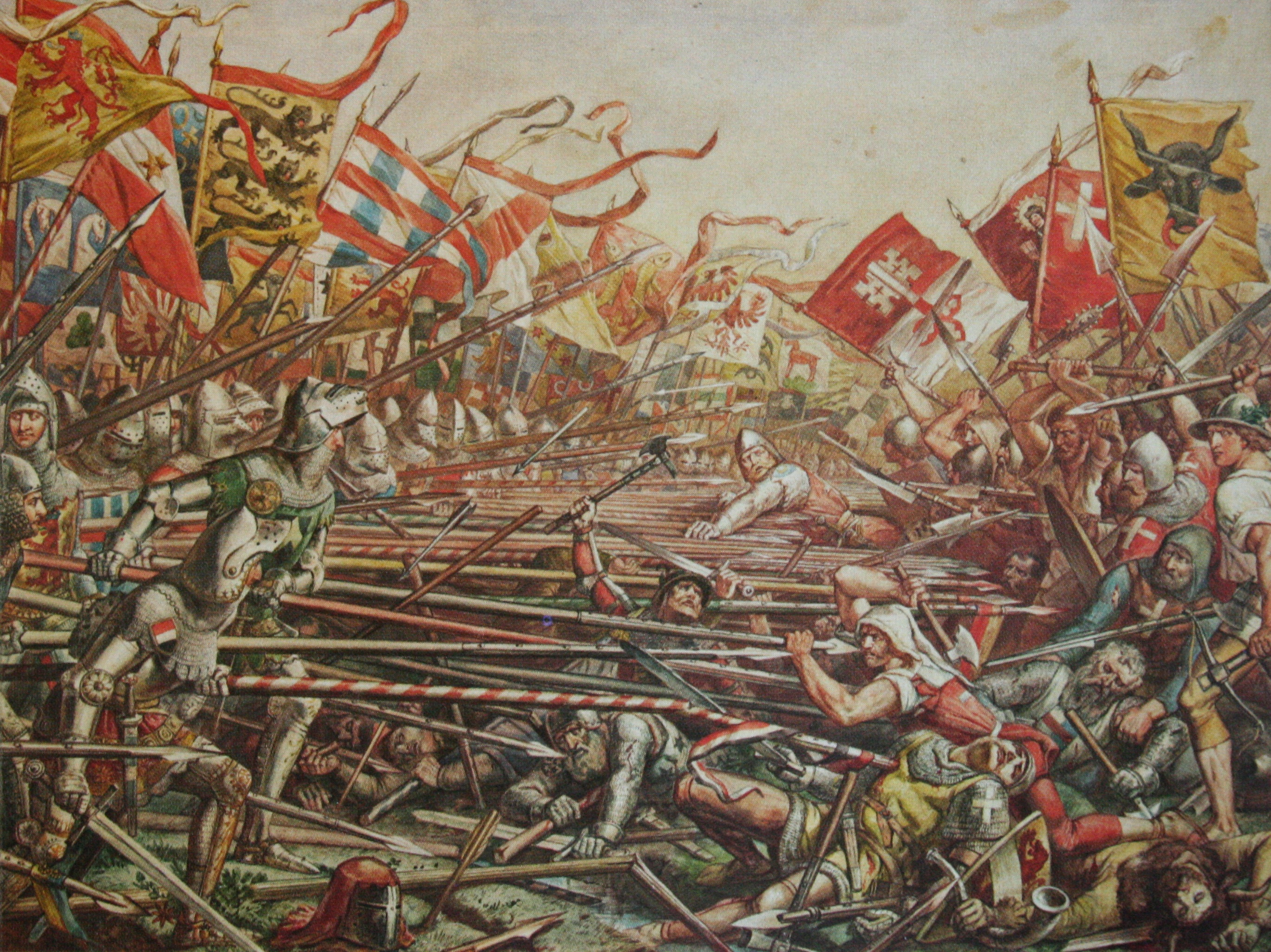
1889 painting by Karl Jauslin

Not without justification, the Battle of Sempach came to be seen as the decisive turning point between the foundation of the confederacy as a loose pact in the 14th century, and its growth into a significant political and military power during the 15th century. A culture of remembrance formed from the city of Lucerne whose Grand Council ordered in the 1380–1390s to remember the 9 July and that annually for bread to the poor and praise to God and Virgin Mary should be provided with. In the following two decades, the neighboring towns and districts of Lucerne were still held by the Habsburg dynasty and in them, the Habsburgian fallen were remembered in the churchly mass. Only in 1415 Sempach came under the control of Lucern. At the peak of the military success of the Eight Cantons in the period of 1470 to 1510, Swiss historiography paid great attention to the Battle of Sempach. It is depicted in the Swiss illustrated chronicles of the period, and discussed by Reformation era historiographers such as Aegidius Tschudi and Wernher Steiner. Since there are few historiographical accounts of the battle predating 1470, it is difficult to judge the historicity of the individual details. The legend of Arnold Winkelried is recorded in this period, but it cannot be shown to predate 1500.

The battle chapel at Sempach was consecrated already in 1387. The chapel was built by the Habsburgians to remember their fallen and only after the accession of Sempach to Lucerne in 1415, the chapel became known as a place of worship for the Swiss. A yearly mass was celebrated there on the day of the battle. The chapel was repeatedly enlarged. It was decorated with a fresco in 1551, which was restored and enlarged in 1638–1643, 1695, 1741–1743, 1747, and 1886. The current fresco is largely a restoration of the painting of 1643.

Swiss patriotism in the restored Confederacy of 1815–1847 rediscovered the formative phase of the Old Confederacy as a source of national identity. The modern Sempacherlied is a product of 1830s patriotism. During the World Wars, the Swiss policy of armed neutrality was also ideologically fueled by reference to the military successes of the medieval confederacy.

Swiss modernist author Robert Walser (1878–1956) recounts the Battle of Sempach in brief but violent detail in his short story "The Battle of Sempach".

== See also ==
- Growth of the Old Swiss Confederacy
- Battle of Näfels
- Battles of the Old Swiss Confederacy

== Sources ==
- Die Schlacht von Sempach im Bild der Nachwelt (exhibition catalogue), Lucerne, 1986.
- Delbrück, Hans (1990). Medieval Warfare. Lincoln: University of Nebraska Press. ISBN 0-8032-6585-9.
- Rainer Hugener, Erinnerungsort im Wandel. Das Sempacher Schlachtgedenken im Mittelalter und in der Frühen Neuzeit, in: Der Geschichtsfreund. Zeitschrift des Historischen Vereins Zentralschweiz 165, 2012, 135–171.
- Stefan Jäggi, "Sempacherkrieg" in German, French and Italian in the online Historical Dictionary of Switzerland.
- Theodor von Liebenau, Die Schlacht bei Sempach. Gedenkbuch zur fünften Säcularfeier, Lucerne (1886).
- G.P. Marchal, Sempach 1386, 1986.
- G.P. Marchal, Zum Verlauf der Schlacht bei Sempach, in: Schweizerische Zeitschrift für Geschichte 37, 1987, 428–436.
- Peter Xaver Weber, Der Sempacher Krieg. Erinnerungsschrift zur 550. Gedächtnisfeier der Schlacht bei Sempach, Lucerne (1936).
- Wheatcroft, Andrew (1996). The Habsburgs: Embodying Empire. London: Penguin Books. ISBN 0-14-023634-1.
