= Rotzberg Castle =

Rotzberg
- Rotzburg
- Rotzberg by Ennetmoos
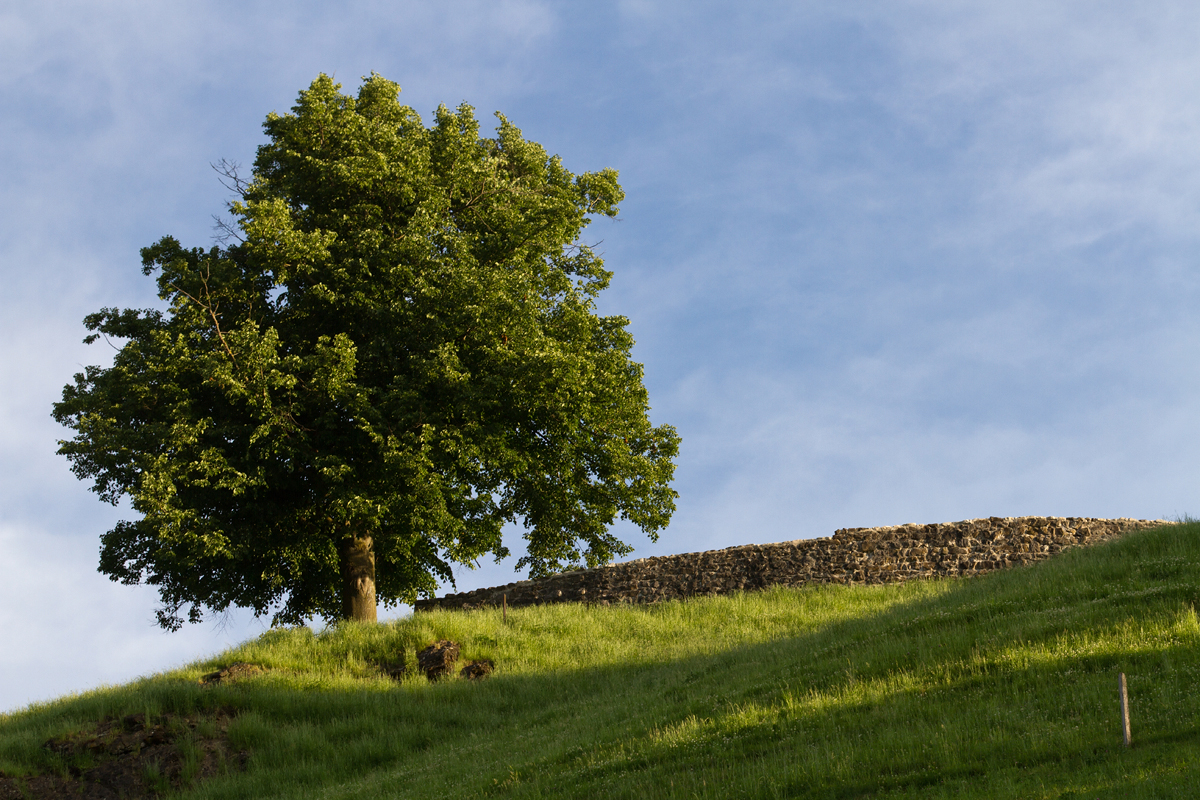
- Ruins of Rotzberg

Site information
- Type: hill castle, spur castle
- Code: CH-NW
- Condition: ruin

Location
- Coordinates: 46°57′51″N 8°20′11″E
- Height: 672 m above the sea

Rotzberg or Rotzburg is a ruined castle in the municipality of Ennetmoos in the canton of Nidwalden in Switzerland.

== History ==
Nothing is known about the original name, construction date or owner of the castle. Prehistoric pottery shards have been discovered under the castle, as well as medieval artifacts from the 10th to 12th centuries. In 1150 the Freiherr von Rotenburg granted extensive lands around Stans and Ennetmoos to Murbach-Lucerne Monastery. It is possible that he may have built a castle on these lands to administer his lands. In an 1197 record the Rozziberg is listed as owing taxes to Engelberg Abbey, from which castles were normally exempt. This may indicate that the castle was built after this date. However, the generally accepted date of the ring wall is the 12th century. The wooden buildings inside the ring wall were probably replaced with stone between 1210 and 1230.

According to the White Book of Sarnen (compiled ca. 1470), Rotzberg was one of the castles destroyed in the Burgenbruch rebellion against the Habsburg reeves in ca. 1308, the event marking the foundation of the Swiss Confederacy. Aegidius Tschudi, writing in ca. 1550, dates the event to New Year's Day 1308. In Tschudi's account of the men had a relationship with a serving maid in the castle and convinced her to let down a rope so he could climb up into her bedroom one night. After he climbed up and distracted her, an additional 20 men used the rope to storm the castle and destroy it.

There is no archaeological evidence pointing to a violent destruction of the castle. It is unknown when exactly the castle was abandoned, but this likely happened still in the 13th century, with proposed dates as early as 1239.

The hill top with the ruined castle was used as a look out station during the 1798 French invasion and the 1847 Sonderbund War. During the 17th and 18th centuries the hill was used as a hermitage. In 1872 a small pension was built in the center of the old castle courtyard. In 1910, a plan to demolish the ruins and build a hotel pushed the Federal Government to buy the site for CHF 18,000 and declare it a protected heritage site.

In 2010 the Swiss Federal Government repaired and cleaned the ruins. In 2015 they announced that they are planning to transfer responsibility over the ruins to the Canton on Nidwalden.

== Castle site ==
The castle was surrounded by a large five sided ring wall that enclosed about 1,000 m^{2} (0.25 acres). The wall was up to 1.6 m (5.2 ft) thick on the west side and 1.1 m (3.6 ft) thick on the remaining sides. It was built of carefully fitted dressed stone. The western wall was also protected by a 6 m (20 ft) wide ditch while the other sides had steep slopes protecting them.

== See also ==
List of castles and fortresses in Switzerland
