= Covenant (historical) =

Formal promise or agreement

In a historical context, a covenant applies to formal promises that were made under oath, or in less remote history, agreements in which the name actually uses the term 'covenant', implying that they were binding for all time.

One of the earliest attested covenants between parties is the so-called Mitanni treaty, dating to the 14th or 15th century BC, between the Hittites and the Mitanni. Key elements of this type of Hittite international covenant treaty included a preamble identifying the king, a historical prologue that detail the monarch's deeds, the stipulated obligations of the vassal state, where the covenant would be stored, as well as an outline of the blessings if the document is obeyed and curses if the terms were broken.

Historically, certain treaties and compacts have been given the name "covenant", notably the Solemn League and Covenant that marked the Covenanters, a Protestant political organization important in the history of Scotland. The term 'covenant' appears throughout Scottish, English and Irish history.

The term covenant could be used in English to refer to either the Bundesbrief of 1291, which established the confederacy of Uri, Schwyz, and Unterwalden. It is also used to refer to the Pfaffenbrief of 1370. These documents led to the formation of the Swiss state or "Eidgenossenschaft". In this usage the German "Eid" is being translated as "covenant" rather than "oath" in order to reflect its written status.

In modern law, covenant is described as "a promise or agreement under consideration, or guarantee between two parties" and is distinguished from modern contract by the seal or symbol of guarantee.
