= Petermann von Gundoldingen =

Schultheiss of Lucerne (died 1386)

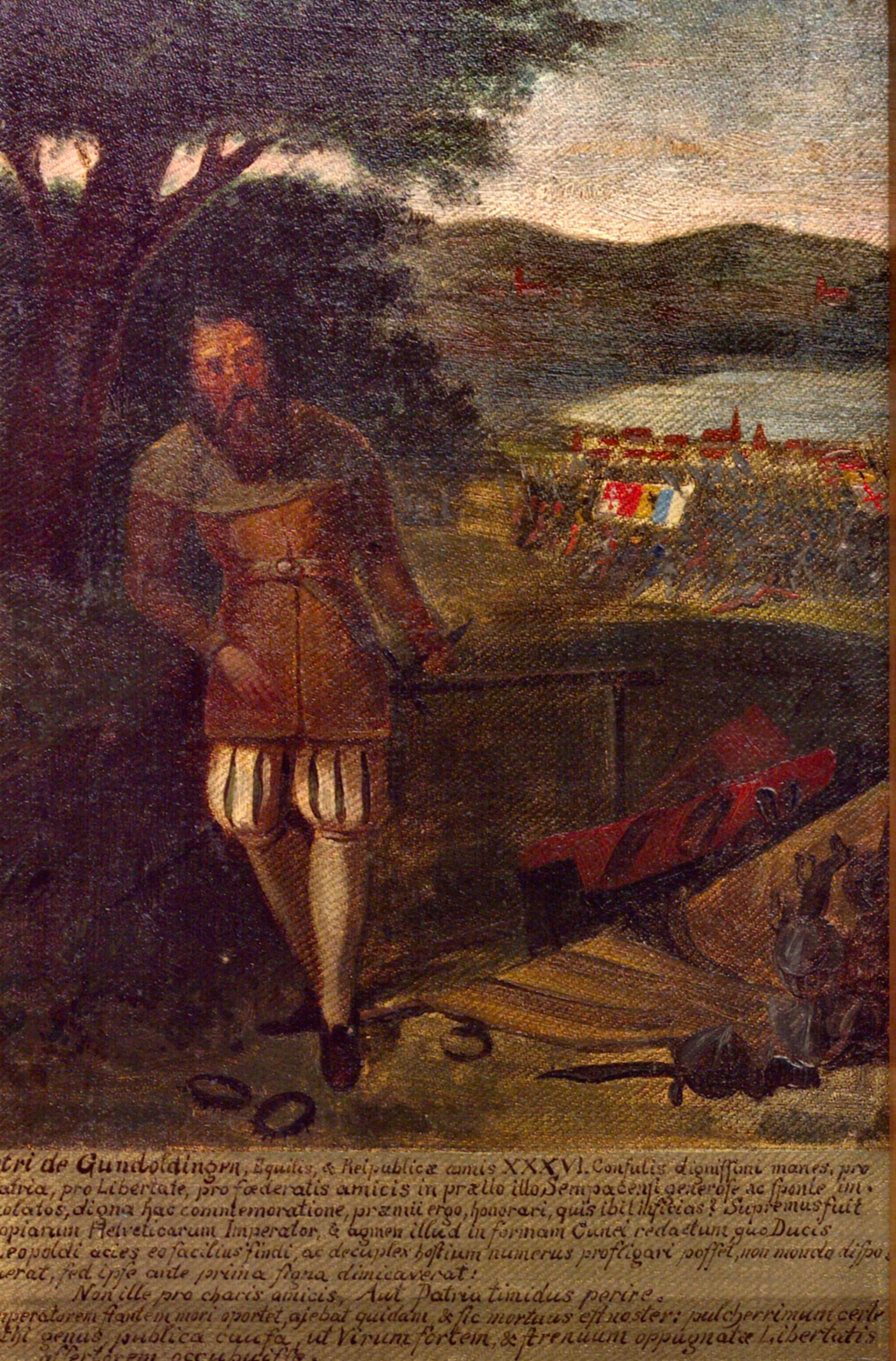
- Portrait in the Lucerne Central and University Library

Schultheiss of Lucerne
- In office 1361–1384
- Preceded by: Werner von Gundoldingen

Personal details
- Died: 9 July 1386 Battle of Sempach
- Spouses: Berchta von Garten; Agnes von Moos
- Parent: Werner von Gundoldingen (father)

Petermann von Gundoldingen (died 9 July 1386) was Schultheiss (chief magistrate) of Lucerne from 1361 to 1384. Under him, Lucerne began its transformation from an Austrian provincial town into a territorial lordship. In 1386 he was given supreme command of the Lucerne troops in the Sempach War against Austria, and he died in the Battle of Sempach.

== Biography ==
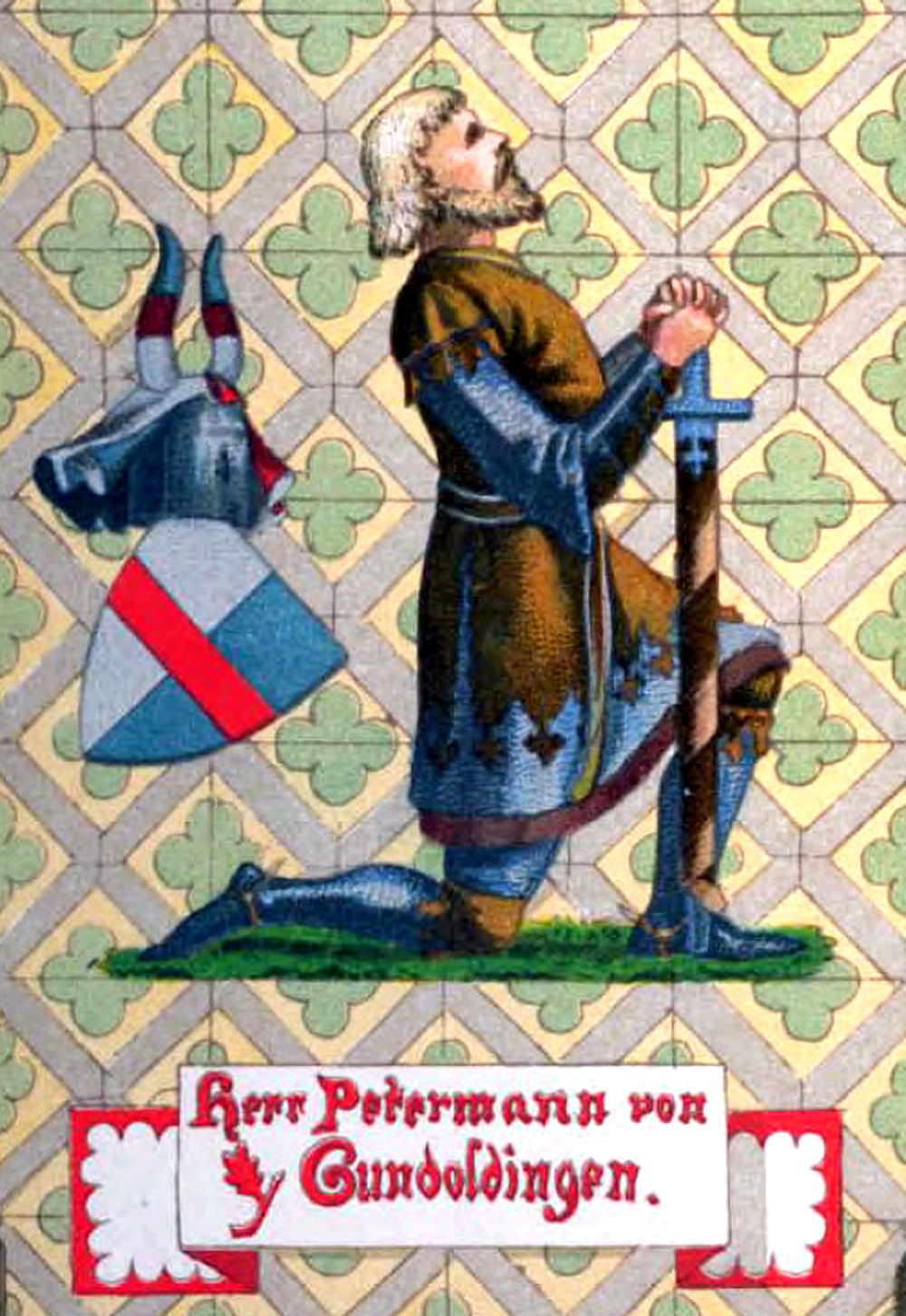
Gundoldingen and his coat of arms as depicted in Die Helden von Sempach (1886)

Petermann von Gundoldingen was the son of Werner von Gundoldingen, Schultheiss of Lucerne. He married first Berchta von Garten and then Agnes von Moos. The Gundoldingen, a Lucerne family of magistrates, were probably named after the Gundoldingen farm south of Hochdorf. His father Werner, probably a tanner, was the richest citizen of Lucerne in 1352, and from 1346 Werner and his brother Niklaus repeatedly served as Schultheiss.

Succeeding his father, Gundoldingen was Schultheiss of Lucerne from 1361 until December 1384, when a constitutional change forced him to resign. His coat of arms, the Lucerne shield with an Austrian sash, symbolizes the political situation of his time. Under him, Lucerne began its transformation from an Austrian provincial town (Landstadt) into a territorial lordship. In 1366 Lucerne took over from the counts of Frohburg the pledge on the bailiff's tax (Vogtsteuer), which formed a basis of the city's acquisition policy. In 1379 the bailiwick of Ebikon was granted to Gundoldingen and his son as an Austrian fief, and in 1380 he acquired the bailiwick of Weggis for Lucerne. From 1380 the grants of citizenship rights (Burgrecht) in what later became Lucerne territory intensified. Gundoldingen also acted as an arbitrator for the Confederate cantons and for Austria.

His capture in Zurich in 1370 by Provost Bruno Brun was one of the reasons for drawing up the Pfaffenbrief. In 1386 Gundoldingen was given supreme command of the Lucerne troops in the Sempach War against Austria. He died in the Battle of Sempach on 9 July 1386. Among the Confederacy's figures of identification, Gundoldingen was eclipsed by the figure of Winkelried.

== Bibliography ==
- T. von Liebenau, "Die Schultheissen von Luzern", in Der Geschichtsfreund, 35, 1880, 55–182
- M. Estermann, "Aus der Geschichte der Gundoldingen", in Das Vaterland, 3 July 1886
- K. Müller, "Petermann von Gundoldingen", in Innerschweizerisches Jahrbuch für Heimatkunde, 8–10, 1944–1946, 61–74
