= Mueterschwanderberg =

Mountain in Switzerland

Coordinates: 46.953°N 8.315°E

The Mueterschwanderberg (also Mueterschwandenberg) is a ridge forming the southern shore of Alpnachersee, just northwest of Stanserhorn and west of the village of Ennetmoos, Nidwalden, Switzerland. Its peak is at an elevation of 860 m (some 425 m above the lake surface). The peak is known as Drachenflue (Drachenfluh), with the Drachenloch cave nearby, named for the dragon which according to legend was slain here by Heinrich von Winkelried.

The Mueterschwanderberg is known for the historical artillery fortress built into the mountain, constructed during the Second World War, during 1941 to 1944. Mueterschwanderberg was the largest such fortress in Switzerland. It remained in service throughout the Cold War period. Its decommission was decided in 1998, and it was dismantled in 2007.
