= Arnold von Winkelried =

Legendary Swiss hero

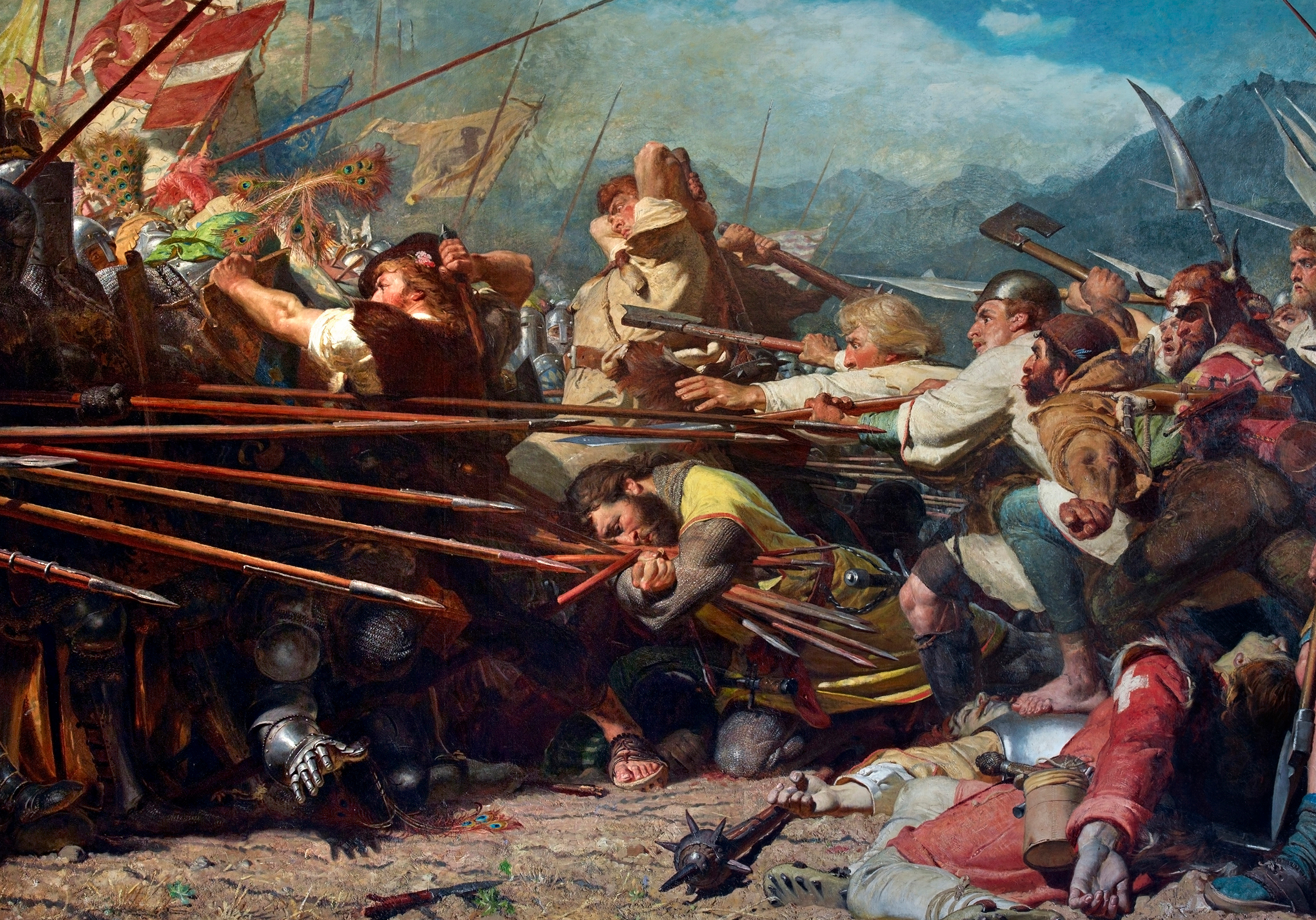
Winkelried falls after being pierced by pikes in this 19th-century Romantic artist's impression of the legendary deed, painted by Konrad Grob.

Arnold von Winkelried or Arnold Winkelried was a legendary hero of Swiss history. 16th-century legend recounts that, at the Battle of Sempach in 1386, Winkelried gathered the pikes of his Habsburg enemies to his chest, killing himself and opening a gap in the Habsburg ranks which allowed the Old Swiss Confederacy to win the battle.

Winkelried's existence was long taken as fact, but many 20th-century scholars concluded that Winkelried probably did not exist based on a lack of primary sources. His historicity remains a battle of scholarly disagreement.

== Legend ==
According to legend, the Swiss initially could not break the close ranks of the Habsburg pikemen. Winkelried cried: "I will open a passage into the line; protect, dear countrymen and confederates, my wife and children..." He then threw himself upon the Austrian pikes, taking some of them down with his body. This broke up the Austrian front and made an opening through which the Swiss could attack.

As phrased in the Halbsuterlied printed in the 1530s by Aegidius Tschudi and Wernher Steiner:

Des adels her was veste, ir ordnung dik und breit,
Das verdross die frommen gäste, ein Winkelriet der seit
wend Irs gniesen lon,
min fromme kind und frowen, so will ich ein frevel bston.

Trüwen lieben eydgnossen, min leben verlur ich mit,
sie hand ir ordnung bschlossen, wir mogänds in brechen nit.
ich will ein inbruch han,
des wellend ir min geschlechte in ewig geniessen lan:

Hiemit so tett er fassen, ein arm voll spiess behend
den sinen macht er ein gassen, sin leben hat ein end.
er hat eins lewen mut,
sin manlich dapfer sterben, was den vier waldstetten gut.

Also begunndentz brechen, des adels ordnung bald,
mit howen und mit stechen, gott siner seelen walt
wo er das nit hett gton,
so wurds d eydgnossen han kostet noch mengen bidermann.

Translation:

The host of the nobles was solid, their order both thick and wide
This frustrated the pious host; one Winkelried said:
"If you will aliment
my pious wife and children, I will do a daring deed."

"True and dear confederates, I shall lose my life doing it.
Their battle order is locked tight, we may not breach it
But I will make a breach
For this may you aliment my family forever."

Saying thus he quickly grasped an armful of pikes,
On his own he created a passage, and his life took an end.
He had the courage of a lion,
His brave and manly death was a benefit for the four forest-cantons.

And thus they soon began to break up the battle order of the nobles
with hewing and with thrusting; may God keep his soul.
had he not done this deed
it would have cost the confederates many a brave man.

Two other verses describe the order of battle of the Austrian side. According to this testimony, the knights dismounted, presumably because they were forced to fight from the lower ground, and they cut off their shoe-tips for better mobility. Even though they would have had a sufficient force of mercenaries to engage the outnumbered Swiss, the nobility wanted to engage the enemy on their own, because they were concerned that the mercenaries would make such short work of the peasants that they themselves would not see any action at all, which would have been to their dishonour:

Sie bunden uff ir helme, und tatends fürher tragen.
von schuhen huwents dschnäbel, man hätt gefüllt ein wagen;
der adel wolt vornen dran,
die andern gmeinen knechte, müstend dahinden stan.
Zusammen sie nun sprachend: "das völckli ist gar klein,
söltind üser puren slahen, unser lob das wurde klein
man spräch: 'die purn hadns gethan.

Translation:

They fastened their helmets and pushed forward
They cut the tips off their shoes, as many as would have filled a cart
The nobility wanted to take the front,
while the common men-at-arms must stand back.
Among themselves, they spoke: "these folk are very few,
if we let the commoners fight for us, our honour would be diminished,
as people would say 'the commoners did all the work."

This is given by means of explanation as to how the breaking of the first rank of pikes by Winkelried could lead to immediate disaster for the Austrian side, as the leaders of the army were fighting in the van.

Haller (Schweizerschlachten, 1828) reports that in the early 19th century, a pierced mail shirt identified as that worn by Winkelried in the battle was preserved in Stans. Haller also reports a folk tradition according to which Winkelried was found still alive after the battle, and only died of his wounds on the way home in a boat on Lake Sempach.

== Historicity ==
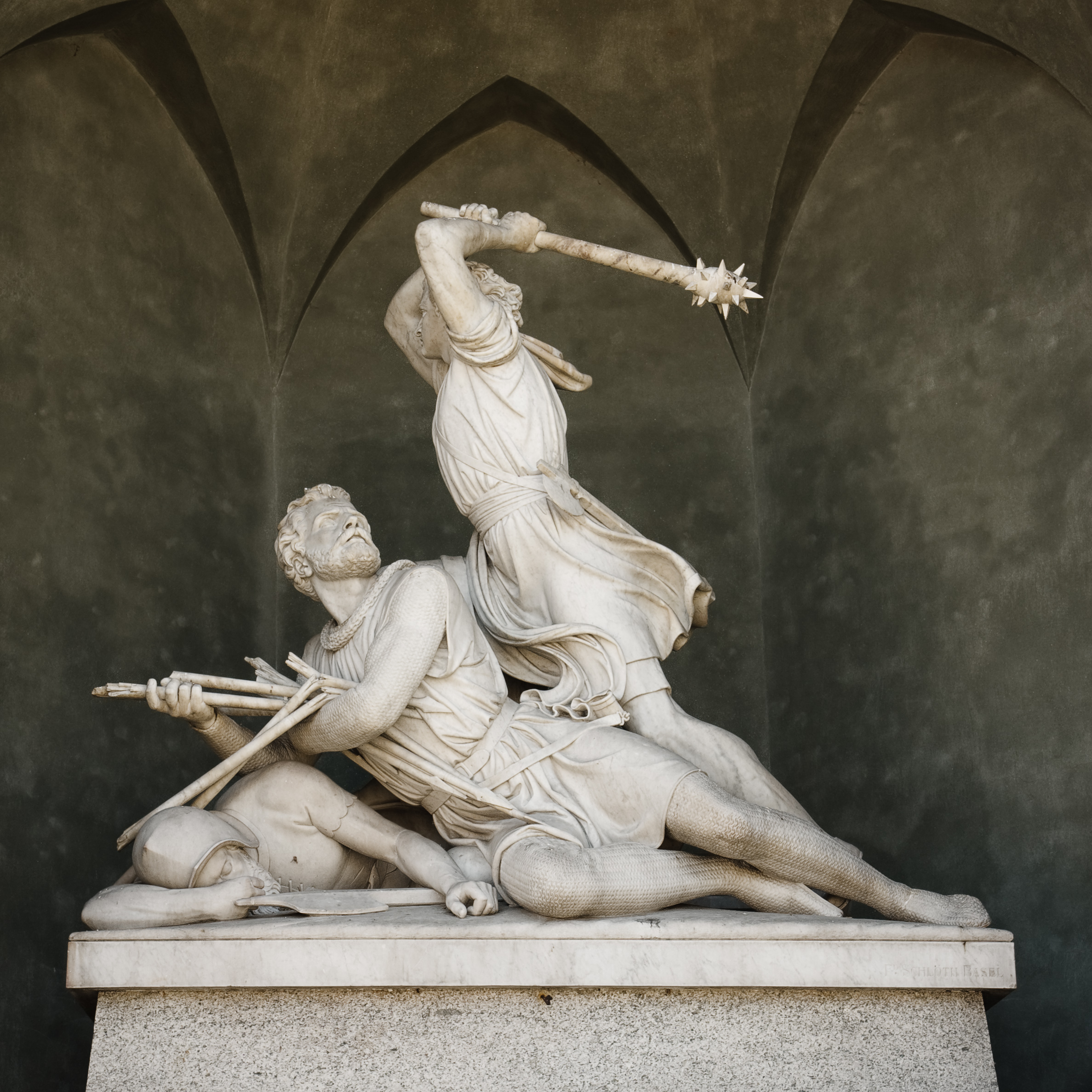
The Winkelried Memorial in Stans; by Ferdinand Schlöth

The historicity of Winkelried and his deed was taken for granted in 19th-century historiography, but in the 20th century it was commonly deconstructed as pure legend. Since the late 20th century, scholarship is again inclined to consider its historicity as plausible, even though no positive proof can be given to substantiate it.

The earliest record of the deed is in the Zürcher Chronik, a manuscript compiled in the 1480s based on older sources. The hero in this account is unnamed, identified just as ein getrüwer man under den Eidgenozen (a faithful man among the Eidgenossen ("confederates"). In the chronicle of Diebold Schilling of Berne (c. 1480), in the picture of the battle of Sempach there is a warrior pierced with spears falling to the ground, which may possibly be meant to be Winkelried. In the chronicle of Diebold Schilling of Lucerne (1511), though in the text no allusion is made to any such incident, there is a similar picture of a man who has accomplished Winkelried's feat, though he is dressed in the colours of Lucerne.

The name of Winkelried first appears in the 16th century. The hero is still nameless in De Helvetiae origine by Rudolph Gwalther (1538), but Aegidius Tschudi (1536) has "a man of Unterwalden, of the Winkelried family," this being expanded in the final edition of the chronicle (1564) into "a man of Unterwalden, Arnold von Winckelried by name, a brave knight,". He is entered (in the same book, on the authority of the "Anniversary Book" of Stans, now lost) on the list of those who fell at Sempach at the head of the Nidwalden (or Stans) men as "Herr Arnold von Winckelriet, Ritter," this being in the first draft "Arnold Winckelriet."

Some edition of the Sempacherlied, which originally dates to about the time of the Burgundian Wars in the 1470s, do mention Winkelried, but these sections are mostly considered additions from the early 16th century, as in the additions by H. Berlinger of Basel to Etterlin's chronicle (made between 1531 and 1545), or the version in Werner Steiner's chronicle (1532). Also from the 16th century is evidence from lists of those who fell at Sempach; the "Anniversary Book" of Emmetten in Unterwalden (drawn up in 1560) has "der Winkelriedt" at the head of the Nidwalden men. A book by Horolanus, a pastor at Lucerne (about 1563), has "Erni Winckelried" some way down the list of Unterwalden men.

It thus appears that the legend may have originated by the 1430s, or at the latest the 1470s, that is within 50 or at the most 90 years of the battle, but the name of "Winkelried" was not associated with the hero before the 1530s or perhaps the 1520s, i.e. the time of the Swiss Reformation, more than 130 years after the battle.

The history of the Winkelried family of Stans has been minutely worked out from the original documents by Hermann von Liebenau in 1854. According to his research, they were a knightly family when we first hear of them about 1250, though towards the end of the 14th century they seem to have been but simple men without the honours of knighthood, and not always using their prefix "von." Liebenau was the first to draw attention to one Erni Winkelried who signed as a witness on a document dated 1 May 1367. This is the only candidate on record for a possible identification of Winkelried with an historical character. Liebenau supposes that because this Erni signed as the last of five witnesses, after one Hans Winkelried, he was presumably still a young man at this time, which would make him of mature age at the date of the battle. He further reasons that the fact that this Erni is absent from record during the 1370s, while Hans is repeatedly seen as a witness, might indicate that during this time the young Erni was abroad in foreign service.

The same name Erni Winkelried however resurfaces on a document dated 29 September 1389, after the battle. Liebenauer again notes how the Erni Winkelried of 1389 signs as the last of the three in his party, which again indicates that he was the youngest among them. Furthermore, an Arnold Winkelried is again attested as landamman of Unterwalden in 1417, it is clear that there were at least two people with this name, perhaps father and eldest son. The older Erni would then have been born around 1350, and the younger around 1370.

As for the plausibility of Winkelried's deed, the single-handed breaking of a line of pikes to open a breach, which is then exploited to turn the course of the battle, a parallel is adduced by Liebenau is that of one Johann Stühlinger, a ministerialis in the service of Regensburg, who in a 1332 battle against Berne and Solothurn broke through the ranks of the enemy with his warhorse, creating just such an opening, which was exploited to the cost of 400 men on the Bernese side. The pikes (spiesse) of the Austrian knights in historical paintings are commonly depicted as the long pole weapons of the 15th-century pike square, but this is an anachronism. The pikes of the late 14th century would still have been considerably shorter. As according to the testimony of the Sempacherlied, the Austrian nobility insisted on fighting against the underestimated Swiss in the front rank, it would have been sufficient to break into just the van of the Austrian army to kill Leopold and other leaders of the army, which would have ended the battle immediately.

== Significance ==
Similar to William Tell, the figure of Winkelried was an important symbol during the formation of the Swiss federal state, and an icon of Swiss independence during World War II. Napoleon referred to Winkelried as “the Swiss Decius immortalized” at Sempach.

Arnold Winkelried is also mentioned in Nature (1836) by Ralph Waldo Emerson and in The Maine Woods (1864) by Henry David Thoreau.

The Sempacherlied of ca. 1836, one of the expressions of Swiss patriotism during the period of Restoration, is dedicated to the heroism of Winkelried. The Argentine writer Jorge Luis Borges uses his name, among many other known Swiss, as a paradigm of the Swiss spirit in one of his late poems: "Los Conjurados" (The Conspirators), which also gives its name to the book.

There is a philosophy called "Winkelriedism", which name is taken from the hero's name. It is based on an individual giving himself up idealistically and sacrificially to the enemy for the betterment of others. Juliusz Słowacki created this way of thinking in his dramatic poem "Kordian", where the titular character decides to kill the Tsar of Russia to take Poland's suffering on himself, easing a breakthrough to freedom for his nation. Słowacki considered Poland the "Winkelried of Nations".

The American historian Jack D. Forbes wrote that childhood stories of heroes like Winkelried, whom he knew as "Arnold Winkler," helped form his "early sense of rightness." Along with the deeds of Native American leaders Powhatan and Opechankanough, and the Scottish hero William Wallace, the young Forbes was told of "Winkler leading Swiss peasants in a charge through the phalanx of Austrian spearmen."
