= Eduard Hallberger =

German publisher

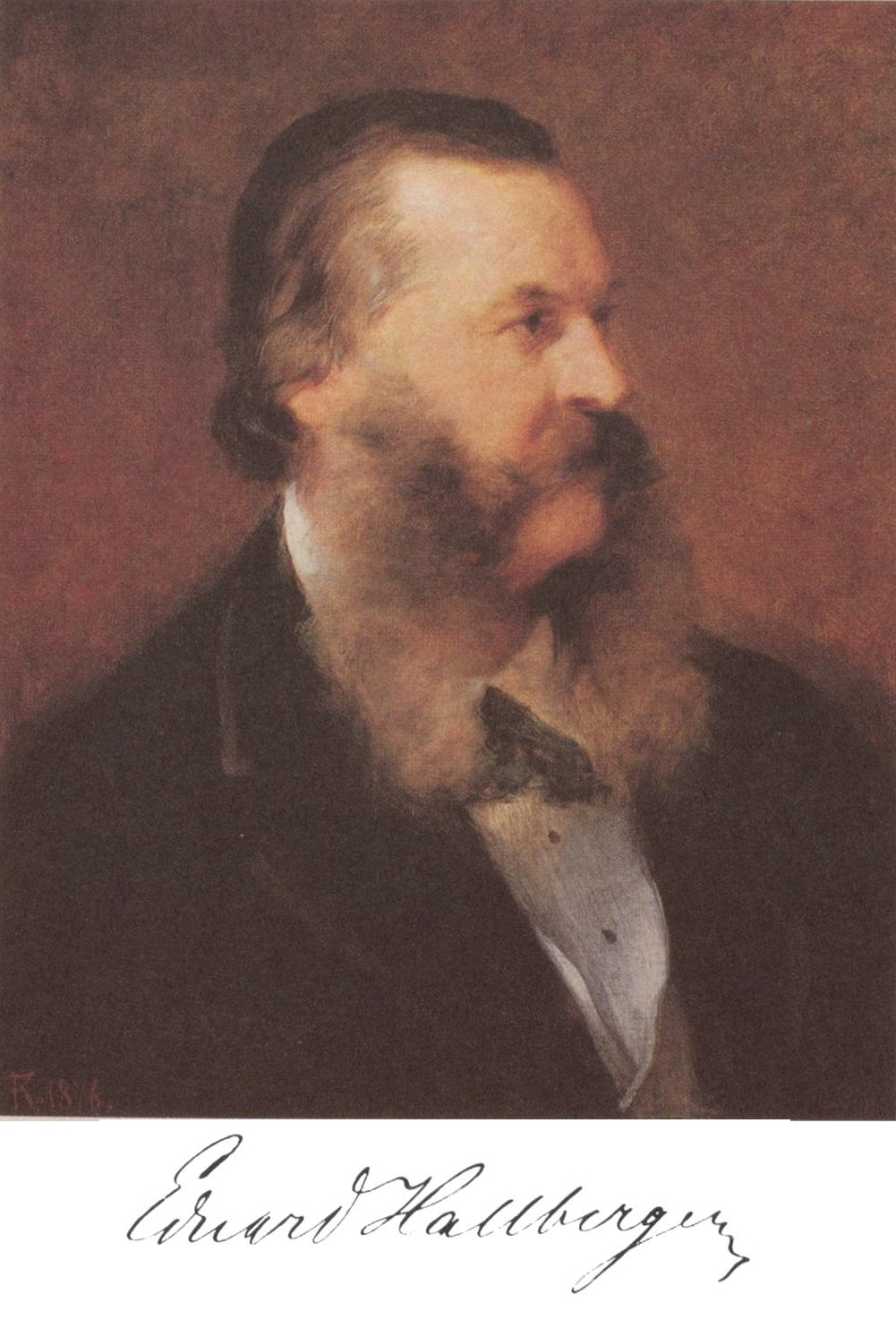
Eduard Hallberger; portrait by Friedrich August von Kaulbach (1876)

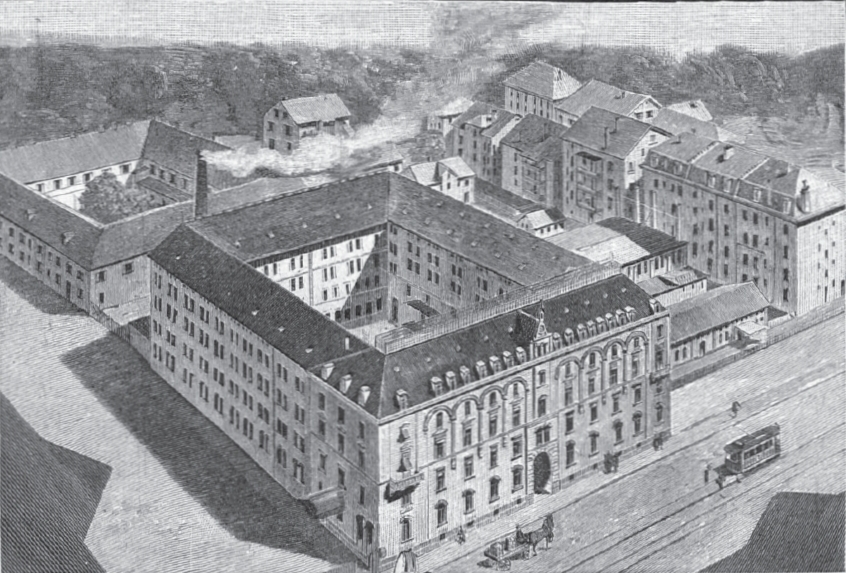
Corporate headquarters in 1898; drawing by Paul Schmohl

Georg Eduard Hallberger, after 1869: von Hallberger (29 March 1822, Stuttgart - 29 August 1880, Tutzing) was a German publisher and businessman.

== Biography ==
He was the son of Ludwig Hallberger, a publisher and bookseller. After serving an apprenticeship in his father's company, he worked for publishers in Potsdam and Berlin. Upon returning to Stuttgart, during the Revolutions, he started his own publishing firm, with an emphasis on youth and folk literature. In 1850, he began issuing a monthly magazine for young people, Jugend-Album, which was published until 1889.

In 1853, he created the family magazine, Illustrirte Welt, which was very successful and eventually had a circulation of 150,000 copies. Encouraged by this, he joined with the writers, Friedrich Wilhelm Hackländer and Edmund Zoller (1822-1902), to create the illustrated news magazine Über Land und Meer. This was equally successful and was published until 1923. Later magazines failed to match the popularity of these first two.

To produce his illustrations, he created "E. Hallberger X. A."; among the largest xylographic companies in Germany. One of his most popular works, Aegypten in Bild und Wort (Egypt in Image and Word), with commentary by the Egyptologist, Georg Ebers, was issued in 1879 and translated into several languages, including English, French and Czech.

After the Franco-Prussian War, he founded a major subsidiary in Leipzig. In 1873, the companies merged and he built new corporate headquarters, designed by Georg von Morlok, which were destroyed by a bombing raid in 1944. Over the years, he expanded his business interests to include coal companies, bricklayers, quarries, cement and paper mills. In Switzerland, he owned a creamery. He also became a major property owner, with buildings throughout Stuttgart and a "castle" in Tutzing, on the Starnberger See.

In 1869, he was named a "Kommerzienrat" and elevated to the nobility in Württemberg. He died at his castle in 1880. Per his wishes, his holdings were transferred to a stock company called the Deutsche Verlags-Anstalt (now a division of Random House). A "Temple of Honor", erected at Ilkahöhe by his daughter, Gabriele, was demolished in the 1970s

== Sources ==
- Max Bach (1904). "Hallberger, Eduard". Allgemeine Deutsche Biographie (in German). Vol. 49. Leipzig: Duncker & Humblot. pp. 721–722.
- Hermann Vietzen (1966). "Hallberger, Eduard v.". Neue Deutsche Biographie (in German). Vol. 7. Berlin: Duncker & Humblot. pp. 539–539. (full text online).
