= Winkelried Memorial =

Memorial in Switzerland

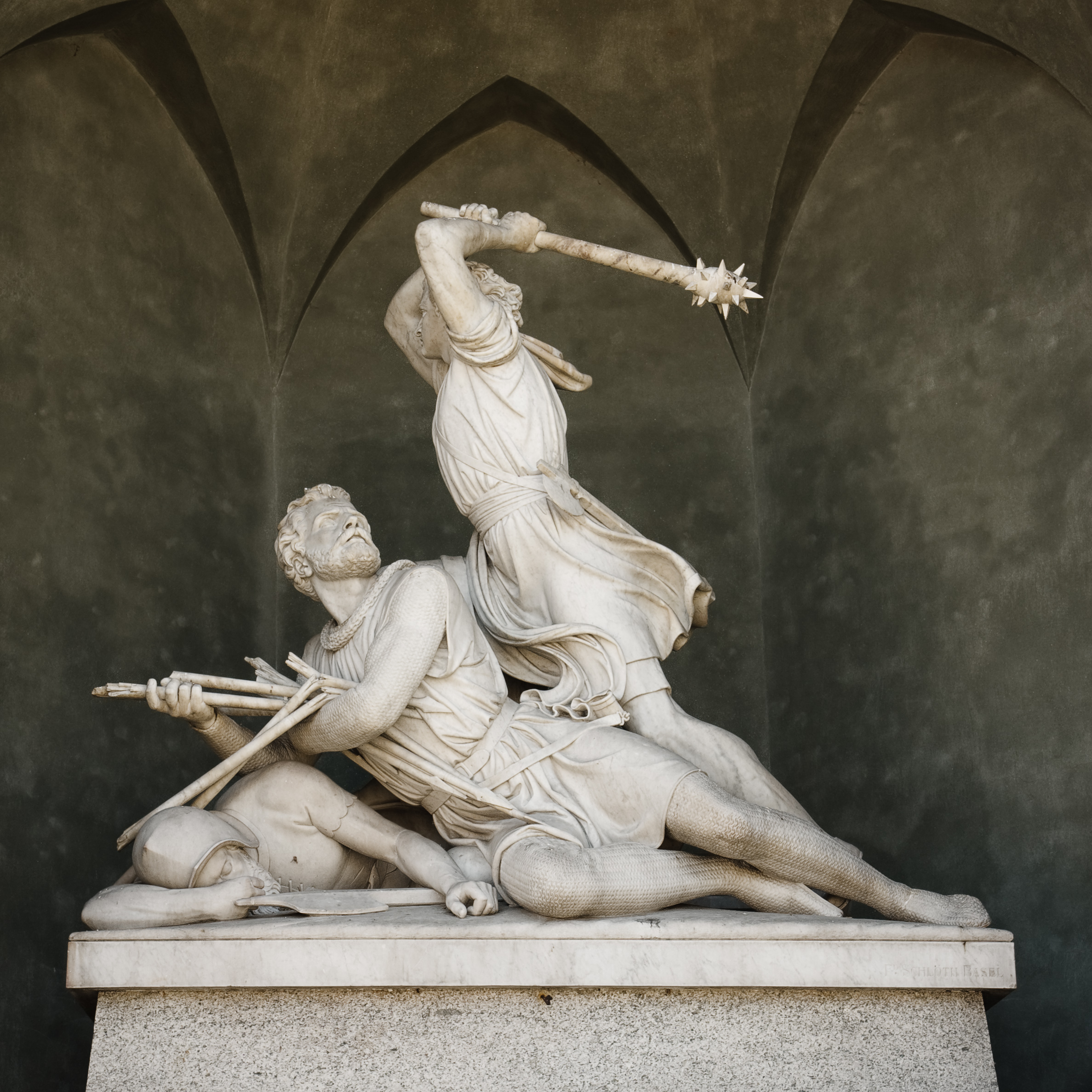
The Winkelried Memorial

The Winkelried memorial was erected in memory of Arnold von Winkelried, who sacrificed his life in the Battle of Sempach on the 9 July 1386. According to the Swiss legend, the Swiss wouldn't be able to break through the firmly positioned order of Habsburg pikemen. At a moment, Winkelried decided to throw himself into the pikes and therefore open a passage through the Austrian defensive front, which made way for an attack of the Swiss confederacy which then led to a Swiss victory in the Battle of Sempach.

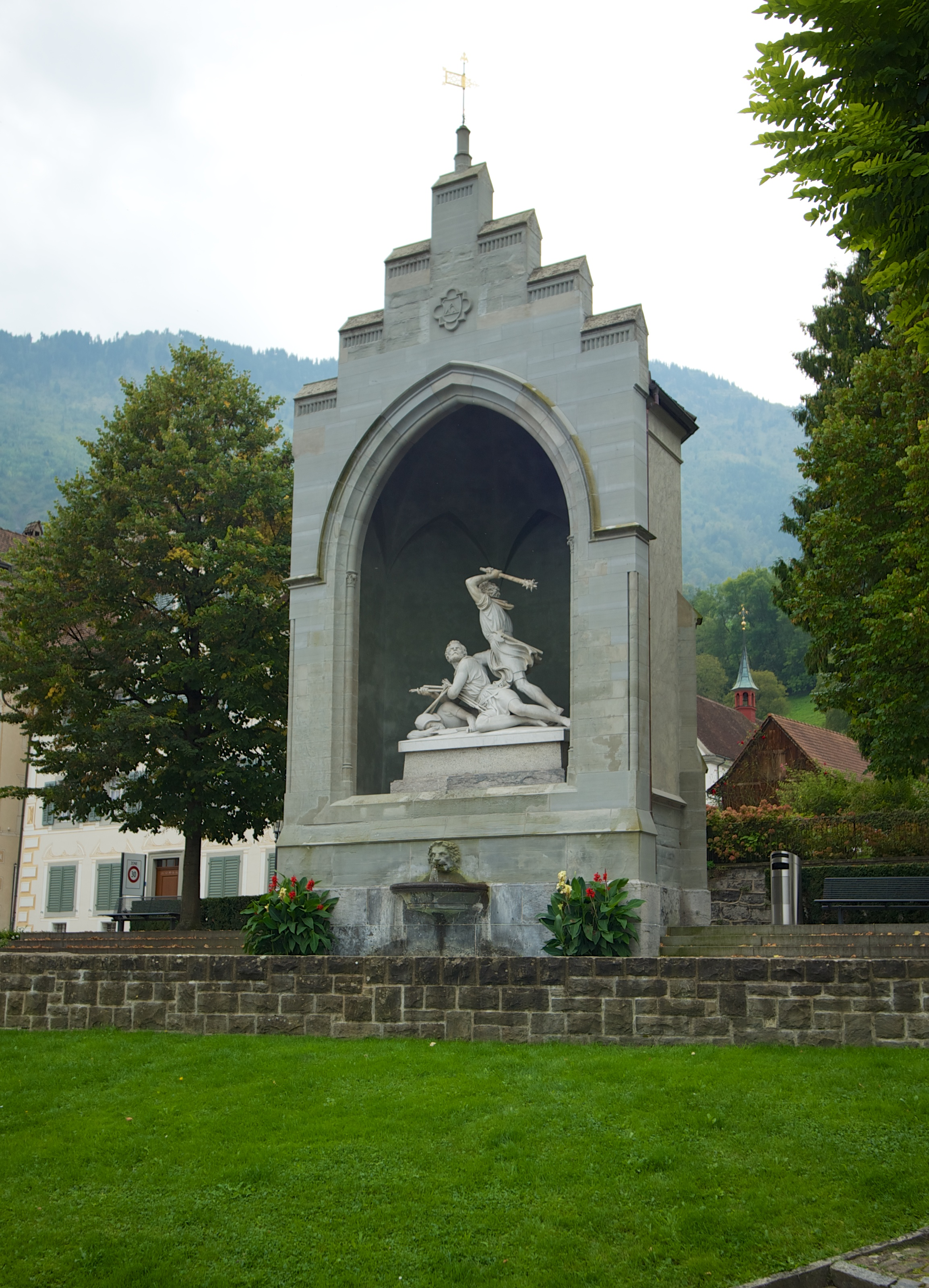
The Winkelried memorial in the protective hall of Ferdinand Stadler

In the case of the Winkelried memorial, the main aim of the people of Stans was not to commemorate the hero, but provide the city of Stans with a representative memorial. Therefore, the people of Stans chose Arnold von Winkelried, as he was a regionally known national figure. The local media would later write that such a monument would attract visitors to the town. The initiative for a new monument came from Anton Albert Durrer (1793–1865), who deemed the Winkelried statue that stood on a central fountain of Stans erected in 1723 as dated and on 14 July 1853 made the corresponding application to the Stans town council while also organizing a fundraising campaign for the realization of the memorial. The location where such a regional monument was to be, was eagerly discussed between the people of Sempach who claimed not the birthplace of the hero was important, but the location of the heroic act. The people of Sempach counted with the support of philosopher Ignaz Paul Vital Troxler who preferred Sempach which lay in the middle of Switzerland.

Durrer was elected as the president of the Winkelried-committee which encouraged the building of a national monument for Winkelried. The city council of Stans approved the realization of a first competition on the 30 September 1853, which by 1854 did not lead to satisfactory results. In June 1856, a second competition on who would create the memorial was held and the models of the competing artists were sent through the different cities of Switzerland. In 1857, the jury chose Ferdinand Schlöths model to be realized after some demanded modifications were agreed on. Ferdinand Schlöth rent a larger workshop at the Via Quattro Fontane in Rome, which suited the demands for the to be realized memorial better than the one he had before. But the demand for the realization of the sculpture was only given on the 22 September 1859, three years after his victory at the competition. He initially received 15'000 Swiss Francs for it. Before the end of the year, he finished a model in plaster, of which he sent photographs to his clients in Switzerland. In December 1861, Schlöth received the money to purchase the Carrara marble block out of which the sculpture was to be worked out. But the final approval for the sculpture he received only in May 1862. Therefore, he began to work on a smaller copy of the Winkelried memorial which he offered for sale in 1864 in Basel. Heinrich Moser bought the piece to offer it to the victor of the national shooting competition, which was to be held in Schaffhausen in 1865. Moser then bought the sculpture back from the winner. In the same year, also the main Winkelried Memorial was finished in Rome. The work in progress received wide acclaim by the visitors of his workshop amongst whom was also Ludwig II of Bavaria. In June 1865 the statue was transported over Marseille and from there with a specially for the memorial built wagon to Lucerne. From Lucerne the sculpture was shipped over the Lake Lucerne to Stansstad and from there it was moved to Stans where it was erected on the 1 August 1865. The Swiss architect Ferdinand Stadler built the hall, with which the memorial was to be protected.
