= Karl Jauslin =

Swiss painter and illustrator

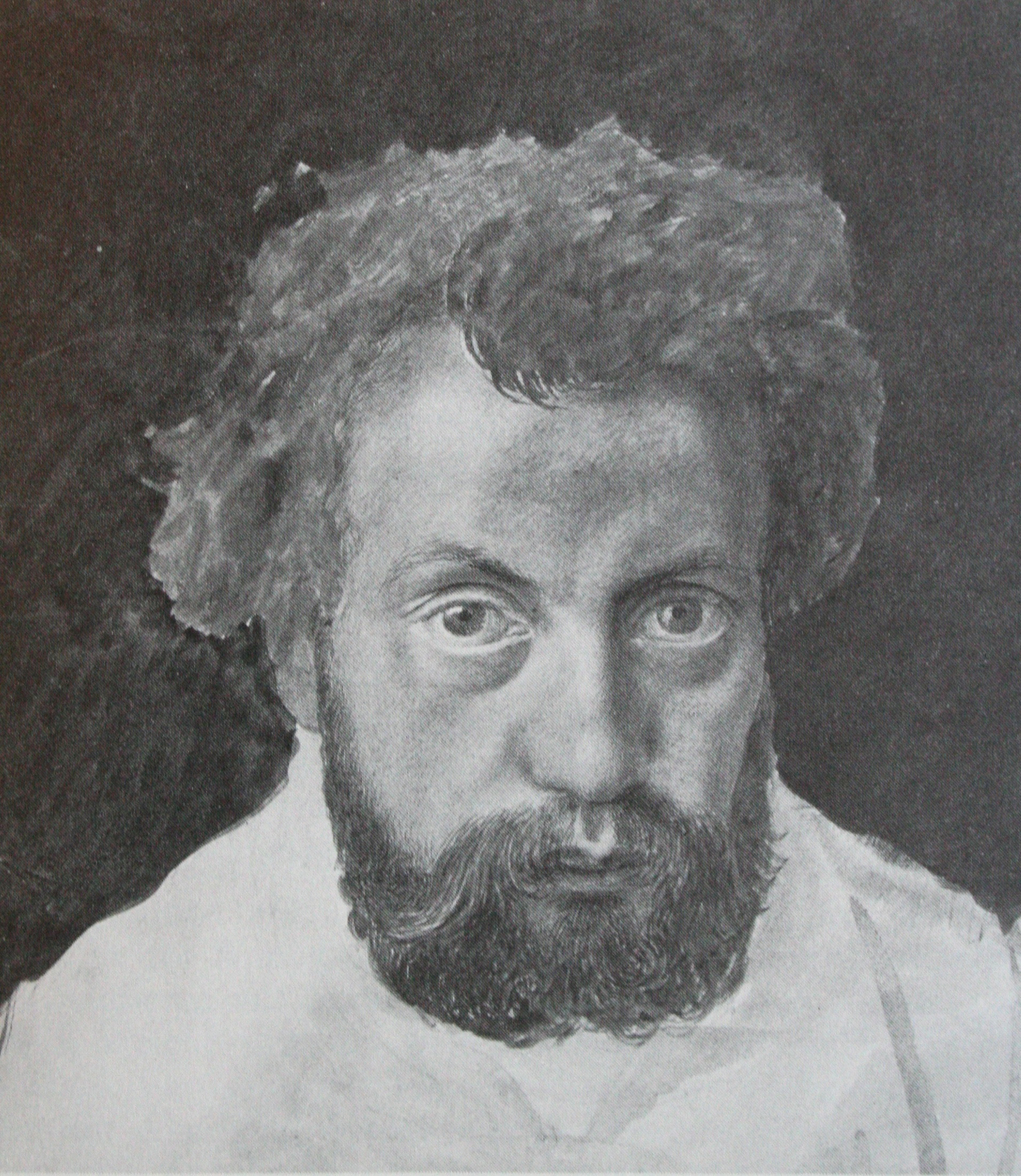
- Self-portrait (c.1870)
- Born: May 21, 1842; Muttenz
- Died: October 12, 1904 (aged 62); Muttenz

Karl Jauslin (21 May 1842 – 12 October 1904) was a Swiss painter and illustrator, known mostly for historical and battle scenes.

== Biography ==
His father was, successively, a quarry worker, a personal servant and a member of the Cantonal police. This necessitated several moves. He drew continuously while in school, portraying figures from history and his classmates.

After his father's death in 1858, he went to work as a construction laborer to help support his family. This proved to be too strenuous for his health, so he found employment at a spinning mill in Dornach, owned by Achilles Alioth (1822-1898), an entrepreneur from Mulhouse. Eventually, he went to Alioth with his drawings and paintings. Surprisingly, Alioth took pity on him and helped him become apprenticed to a decorative painter in Basel named Bernhard Thommen (1826-1868).

As it turned out, he went to work for Thommen's company, painting decorations and stage sets. He remained with him for eight years. Every so often, he would send a painting to Alioth, who believed that Jauslin was studying, which he was, but only part-time in evening classes at the "Zeichnungs- und Modellierschule". During this time, his girlfriend emigrated to America with her family and he decided to remain single.

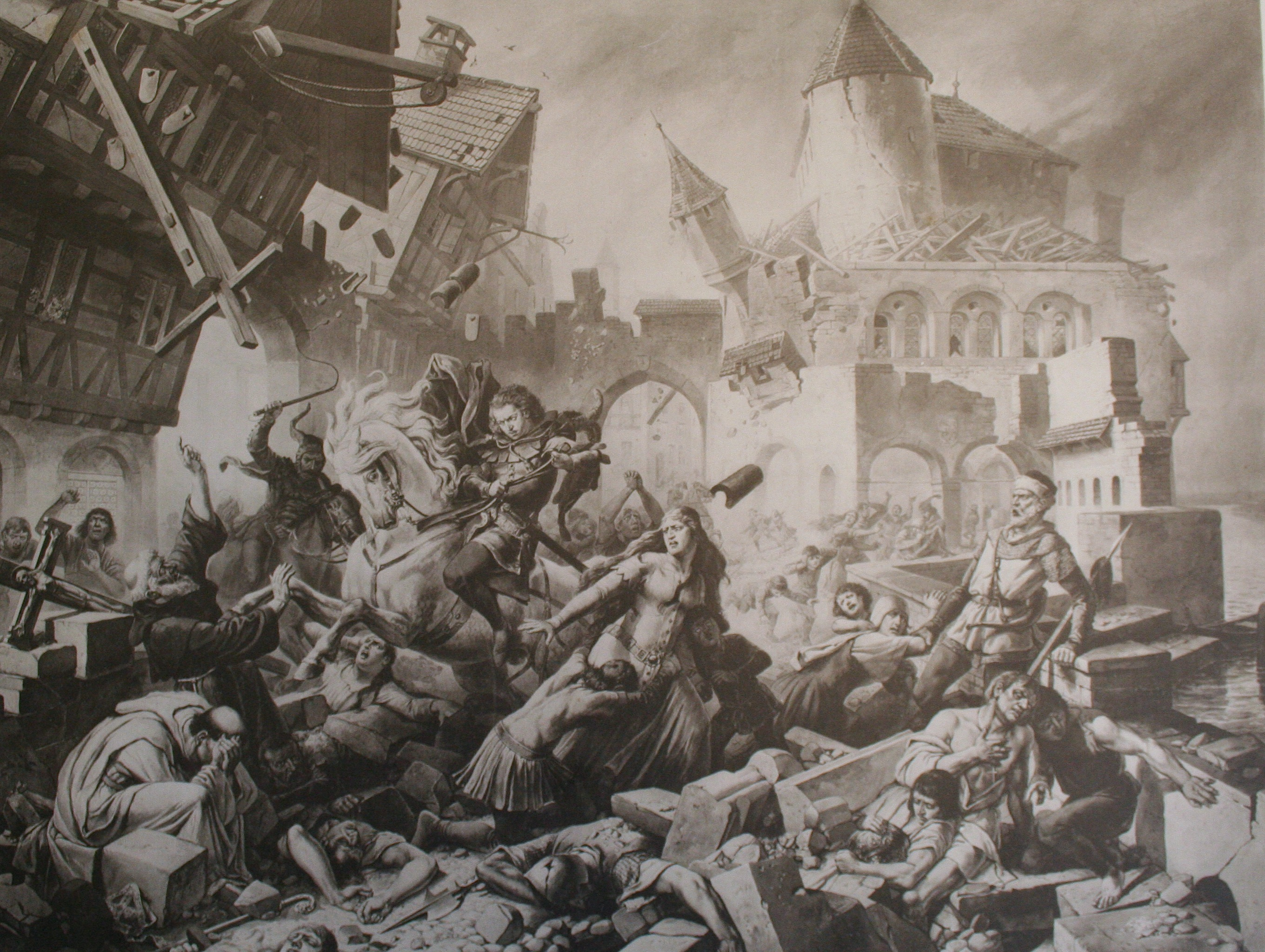
The Basel Earthquake of 1356

After Thommen's death, he had to support himself with odd jobs while trying to sell his paintings, until the beginning of the Franco-Prussian War, when the publisher, Eduard Hallberger, of Stuttgart, hired him to do illustrations of scenes from the war for the magazine Über Land und Meer. This assignment took him to the military hospital in Karlsruhe, Strasbourg during the bombardment, the Siege of Belfort and Les Verrières for the entry of the Armée de l'Est. This enabled him to begin studying at the State Academy of Fine Arts Stuttgart, while continuing to work for Hallberger. He also travelled to Vienna, to make copies of the Old Masters, and created anatomical illustrations at the city hospital for publications by Doctor Salomon Stricker.

=== Life in Muttenz ===
He returned home in 1876, after he had been hired by the firm of Buri & Jeker to do illustrations for the 400th anniversary of the Battle of Morat. While doing this, he developed a lifelong interest in historical uniforms and owned several, including the armor. He stayed when he was done; living with his mother and sister, Bertha, until she married and moved to America. He was able to acquire a small house in 1886, where he stayed for the rest of his life, which was lived quietly, except for a few short trips related to his work.

His paintings never became popular, and he created very few after 1877, when he failed to get a commission for frescoes at the Tellskapelle. It wasn't until 1901 that he took up painting on a large scale again, after receiving an order for two dozen historical scenes from Doctor Heinrich Bircher (1850-1923) of Aargau, who was also a noted military historian. Sixteen were for the opening of the "Kriegs- und Friedensmuseum" (War and Peace Museum) in Lucerne and the other eight were shown at the Louisiana Purchase Exposition in St. Louis, just before his death.

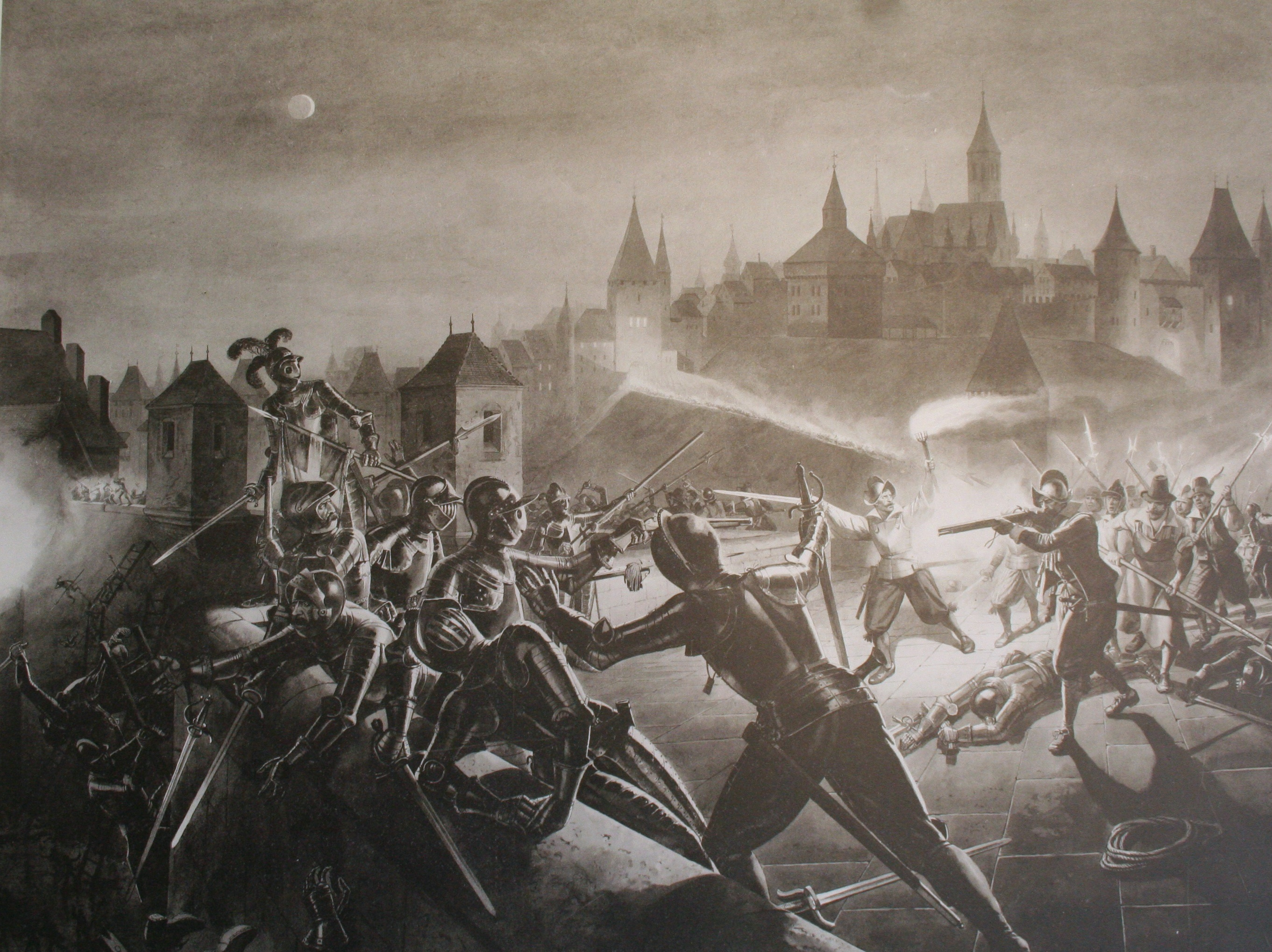
L'Escalade, Geneva (1602)

He suffered a stroke in 1904, after participating in a parade, where he was a costumed standard-bearer. He died two weeks later. His home is no longer standing, but the spot is marked by a monument. His estate included 200 sheets of poetry, written since he was seventeen and his art was looked after by his sister Lina until her death in 1948, when it was bequeathed to the city of Muttenz. It was fully displayed after 1972. A street in Muttenz has been named after him.
