= Friedrich Wilhelm Hackländer =

German writer (1816–1877)

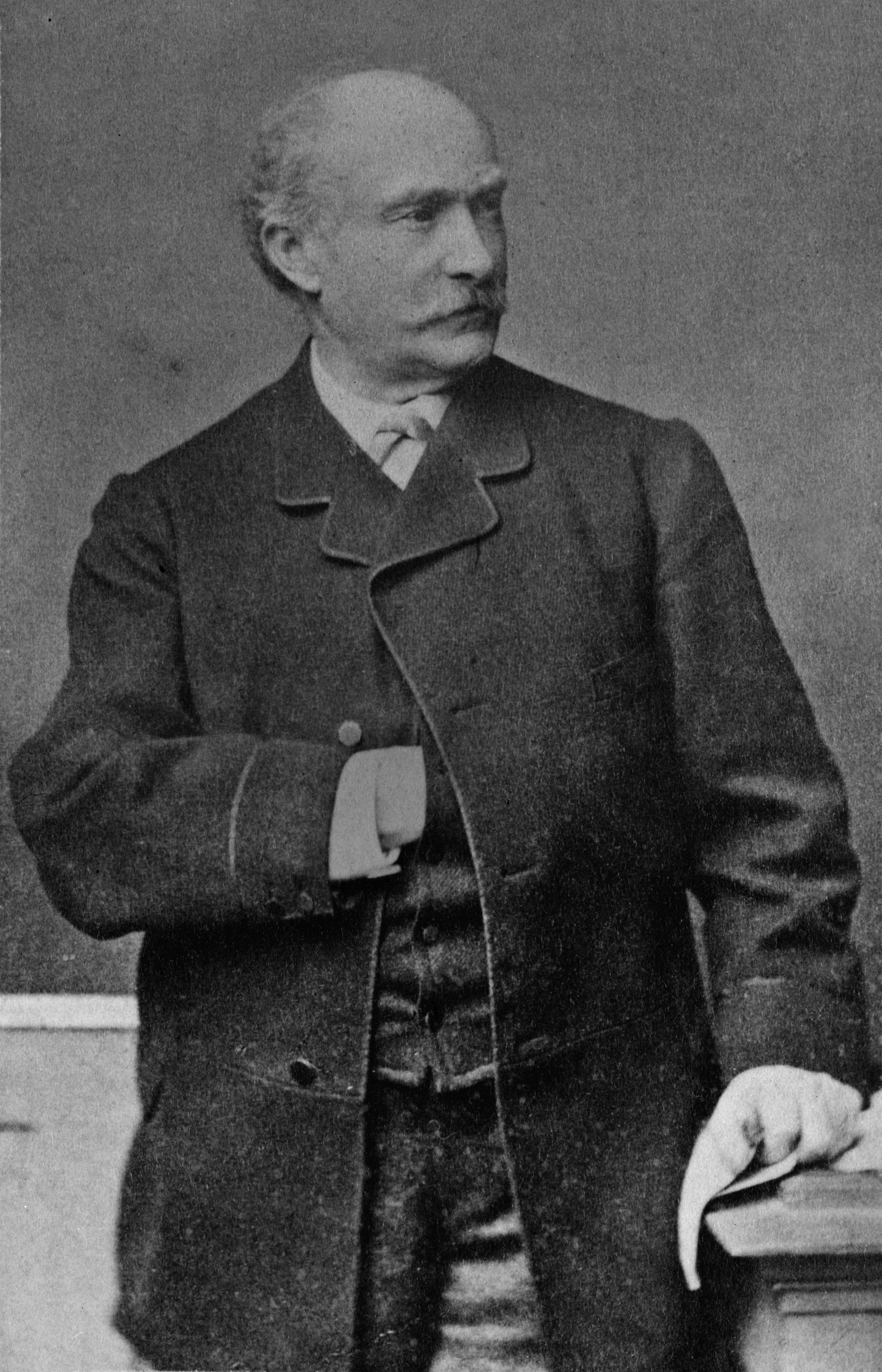
Friedrich Wilhelm Hackländer.

Friedrich Wilhelm Hackländer, in later life von Hackländer (1 November 1816 – 6 July 1877), was a German author.

== Life ==
Hackländer was born in Burtscheid, now part of the city of Aachen, Germany. He was orphaned at the age of 12 and brought up in impoverished circumstances by various relatives. At the age of 14 he was apprenticed in Elberfeld (now Wuppertal) to a shopkeeper, which was highly uncongenial to his own aspirations. He was attracted to military service and therefore entered the Prussian artillery at the age of 16, but found himself unable to make much of a career in that milieu either and therefore returned to the commercial world.

In 1840 he moved to Stuttgart in a complete break from his previous life in the hope of establishing a literary career. The beginnings were unpromising, and when his dramas failed to meet with approval, he was obliged to resort to translating the works of Dickens. However, success came at once when he began to write of his own experiences: his first major published work was Bilder aus dem Soldatenleben im Frieden, of 1841, which drew on his time in military service, and from then onwards, by dint of writing at length about absolutely everything that happened to him, he maintained a successful and prolific writing career.

After a journey to the Near East in 1840 (written up as "Journey to the Orient", or Reise in den Orient, and published 1842), Hackländer was appointed counsellor (Hofrat), secretary and travelling companion to the Crown Prince of Württemberg, which made him familiar with court life. He resigned from court service in 1849 to become a war correspondent in Italy for the newspapers of the important German publisher Cotta, which also resulted in the book Bilder aus dem Soldatenleben im Kriege (1849-1850).

In 1859 Hackländer founded, together with Eduard Hallberger, the illustrated weekly, Über Land und Meer, and he edited the magazine. In 1859 he re-entered the service of the state of Württemberg as director of royal parks and public gardens at Stuttgart. In the same year he was attached to the headquarters staff of the Austrian army during the Italian war. In the following year for his services he was raised to the hereditary nobility as Ritter von Hackländer by the Austrian Emperor and retired into private life in 1864.

Hackländer died at his villa in Leoni on the Starnberger See in Bavaria. He is buried in the Pragfriedhof in Stuttgart.

== Works ==
Hackländer's humorous and realistic style made him very popular and in the mid 19th century he was one of the most widely read writers of Germany. Many of his works centred on important topical issues, such as the working conditions of the poor, and he has sometimes been compared to Charles Dickens. According to the Encyclopædia Britannica Eleventh Edition, his writing is lively, adventurous and even romantic on occasion, but his range is narrow and the character-drawing feeble and superficial. He was a voluminous writer: the most complete edition of his works is the third, published at Stuttgart in 1876, in 60 volumes.

=== Selected publications ===
- 1841 Bilder aus dem Soldatenleben im Frieden
- 1843 Märchen
- 1845 Wachstubenabenteuer
- 1847 Humoristische Erzählungen
- 1850 Handel und Wandel
- 1851 Namenlose Geschichten
- 1854 Europäisches Sklavenleben
- 1857 Der Augenblick des Glücks
- 1866 Künstlerroman
- 1868 Das Geheimnis der Stadt
- 1870 Der letzte Bombardier
- 1872 Freiwillige vor! Kriegsbilder aus den Feldzügen 1870
- 1874 Nullen

=== Recent editions ===
Most of Hackländer's very numerous works have remained unreprinted, but a handful have lasted into, or been revived in, more recent times, including: two collections of fairy stories, Der Leibschneider der Zwerge and Weihnachtsmärchen; the travel book Reise in den Orient, as well as some pieces on the Rhine included with works by other authors in Rheinfahrt; and two of the many autobiographical works, Handel und Wandel, which describes in lightly fictionalised form his dissatisfied early life as cheap labour in a small shop, and Friedrich Wilhelm Hackländer, ein Preusse in Schwaben, which deals with his experiences in Württemberg.
