= Sempacherlied =

Sempacherlied is the title of a number of patriotic songs celebrating the Swiss victory at the Battle of Sempach (1386).

The oldest versions are recorded in the late 15th to early 16th century, e.g. by Melchior Russ (1488), by Wernher Schodeler (1515) and by Aegidius Tschudi (1536). A version composed by one Hensli Halbsuter in the late 15th century, comprising a total of 63 verses, was printed in 1599 (incipit Im 1386 iar).

The modern song (incipit Lasst hören aus alter Zeit) was written ca. 1836 by Heinrich Bosshard (1811-1877), while visiting Highland, Illinois in the United States. It was set to music by Johann Ulrich Wehrli (1794-1839), in the context of the period of Regeneration, formative of the Swiss national identity which resulted in the foundation of Switzerland as a federal state in 1848.

== See also ==
- Beresinalied
- Winkelried
