= Hermann von Liebenau =

Swiss historian (1807–1874)

Hermann von Liebenau (3 October 1807 – 28 July 1874) was a Swiss historian.

He studied medicine in Germany and Austria until 1836, but after this published in historiography exclusively. He moved to Lucerne in 1837, where he remained until his death with the exception of an absence during 1855 to 1860 during which he was in Roman service as a physician.

He published some works on contemporary history, the Swiss Regeneration and the formation of Switzerland as a federal state but mostly focussed on the medieval history of the Old Swiss Confederacy.

== Works ==
- 1845 „Der Aprilgang der Freischaaren aufgeführt im Jahre 1845 gen Luzern“ (Lucerne)
- 1846 „Versuch einer urkundlichen Darstellung des reichsfreien Stiftes Engelberg St. Benedicten-Ordens in der Schweiz, XII. und XIII. Jahrhundert“ (Lucerne)
- „Die Winkelriede von Stans, bis auf Arnold Winkelried, den Helden von Sempach“, (1854).
- 1864 „Die Tell-Sage zu dem Jahre 1230“ (Aarau)
- 1862 „Arnold Winkelried, seine Zeit und seine That, ein historisches Bild nach den neuesten Forschungen“ (Aarau)
- 1868 „Lebensgeschichte der Königin Agnes von Ungarn, der letzten Habsburgerin des erlauchten Stammhauses im Aargau“ (Regensburg)
- 1873–1875 „Urkunden und Regesten zur Geschichte des St. Gotthardpasses“, Archiv für schweizerische Geschichte, XVIII-XX
