= Ilkahöhe =

Mountain in Germany

Coordinates: 47°54′N 11°15′E

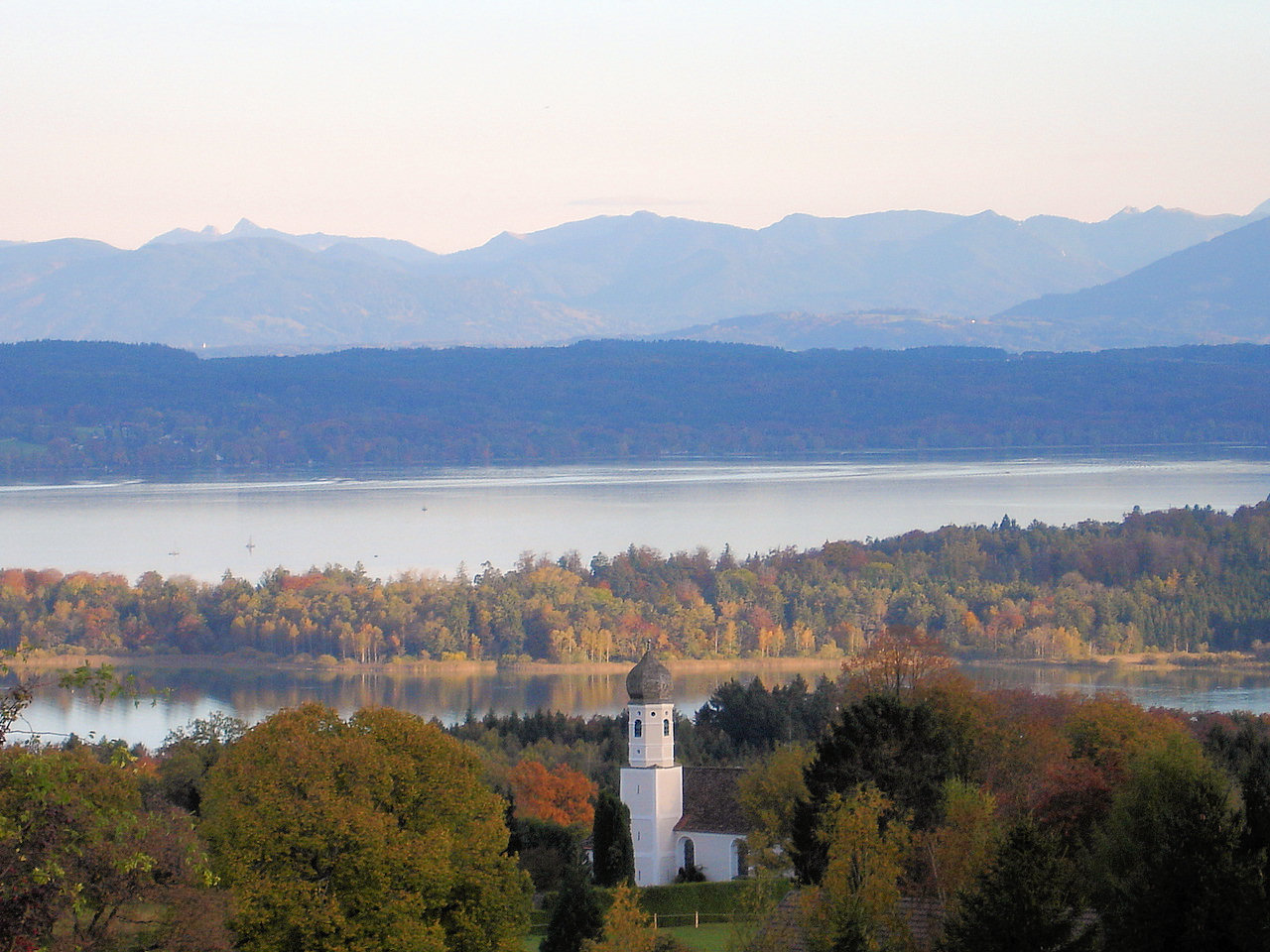
- View from Ilkahöhe towards the Alps

Highest point
- Elevation: 726 m (2,382 ft)

Geography
- Location: Tutzing, Bavaria, Germany

Ilkahöhe is a small mountain of Bavaria, Germany. It is located in the community of Tutzing above a small village called Oberzeismering. It is a popular place to visit on outings from Munich. From the top of the Ilkahöhe, one can see the Alps, including the Zugspitze. It is part of a larger estate that also bears the name Ilkahöhe.

Ilkahöhe was formed in the Würm glaciation. The small mountain is one of the remains of one of the lateral moraines of the glacier of river Würm.

The place is named after Ilka von Wrede. She was a noblewoman who was known for her charity work towards the wounded in the Franco-Prussian War.
