= Über Land und Meer =

German illustrated news magazine (1858–1923)

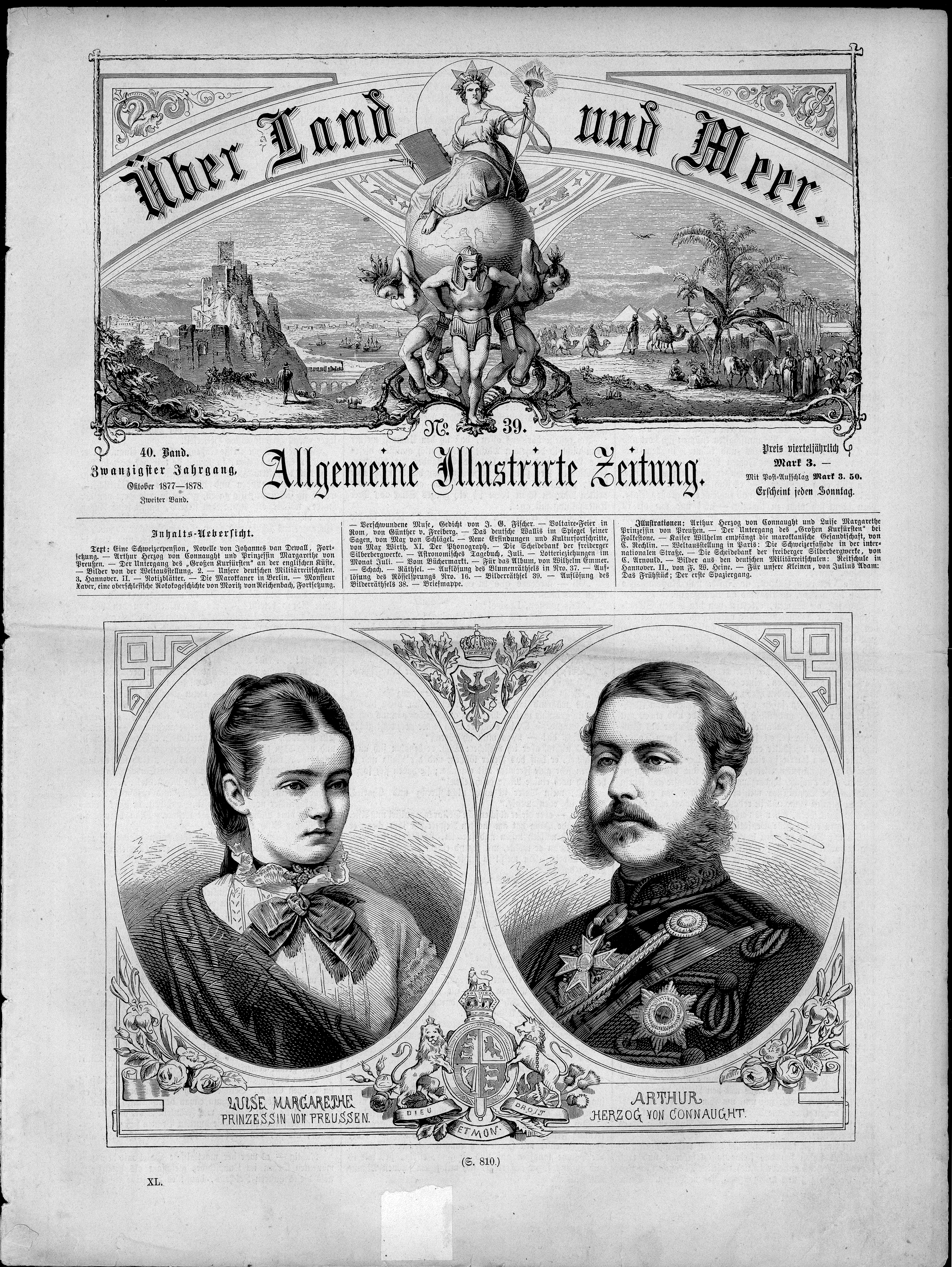
- Title page; October 1877
- Editor: Friedrich Wilhelm Hackländer
- Categories: Illustrated news magazine
- Publisher: Eduard Hallberger Verlag
- Founder: Eduard Hallberger
- Founded: 1858
- Final issue: 1923
- Company: Eduard Hallberger Verlag
- Country: German Empire; Weimar Republic
- Based in: Stuttgart
- Language: German
- OCLC: 1496365

Über Land und Meer (German: Over Land and Sea) was a German illustrated news and political magazine published in Stuttgart, Germany, between 1858 and 1923. Its subtitle was Allgemeine illustrierte Zeitung.

== History and profile ==
Über Land und Meer was founded by Eduard Hallberger in Stuttgart in 1858. Its publisher was Eduard Hallberger Verlag. The founding editor was the successful and high-circulation German novelist Friedrich Wilhelm Hackländer. It became a popular illustrated news magazine among the bourgeois middle classes.

Über Land und Meer mostly published articles reflecting an inclusive patriotism and a view of German colonialism that was intended to be an apolitical scientific approach. Such a journalistic attitude was also shared by other significant German media outlets of the period, including the Westermanns Monatshefte and Die Gartenlaube. However, during the 1880s and 1890s Über Land und Meer also praised colonialism through racist cartoons and news about Germany's colonial activities. The contributors included Berthold Auerbach, Theodor Fontane, Karl May and Paul Heyse. Über Land und Meer ceased publication in 1923, largely due to the high inflation then prevailing in Germany.
