= Pfaffenbrief =

1370 treaty between states of the Swiss Confederacy

The Pfaffenbrief is a contract dated to October 7, 1370, between six states of the Old Swiss Confederacy, Zürich, Lucerne, Zug, Uri, Schwyz and Unterwalden (with Bern and Glarus missing).

In the Pfaffenbrief they for the first time expressed themselves as a territorial unity, referring to themselves as unser Eydgnosschaft. They assumed in this document authority over clericals (Pfaffen), subjecting them to their worldly legislation. Furthermore, the Pfaffenbrief forbade feuds and the parties pledged to guarantee the peace on the road from Zürich to the St. Gotthard pass.

The immediate cause of the contract was an attack of the provost of the cathedral (Grossmünster) of Zürich, Bruno Brun, on Peter von Gundoldingen, mayor of Lucerne, on September 13, 1370. Brun held Gundoldingen imprisoned and refused to recognize the jurisdiction of a secular court, but was banned from Zürich and his prisoner released. The Pfaffenbrief was drawn up because the Confederacy was concerned that Brun, who was in Habsburg services, might still appeal to a court of the Holy Roman Empire, or to an ecclesiastical court, and to avoid similar disputes in the future.
