= Winkelried =

Family of Unterwalden

The Winkelried family was a Swiss noble family of Unterwalden, recorded as members of the lower nobility during the second half of the 13th century and as commoners during the 14th to early 16th centuries. The name is mostly associated with Arnold von Winkelried, the hero of the Battle of Sempach (1386) in Swiss historiography. Because of the importance of Arnold Winkelried in 19th-century Swiss nationalism, much research has gone into the genealogy of this family.

== History ==
Their origin was presumably in the territory of Ennetmoos in Nidwalden, where a toponym Wichried (Wychried, 46.953°N 8.340°E) has survived into modern times. The first recorded member of this family was the knight Rudolf von Winkelried, attested in a letter dated to the 1240s. Heinrich von Winkelried was probably a son of Rudolf, als recorded as a knight and ministerialis of count Rudolf von Habsburg, between 1275 and 1303. Heinrich became connected him with a legend of a dragon fight, first recorded by Etterlin (1507). Abbot Rudolf I of Engelberg who lived during the same period may also have been a member of the family.

After Heinrich, the Winkelrieds lose their distinction as noblemen. People bearing the name Winkelried are recorded as mostly prosperous commoners during the 14th and 15th centuries. These later Winkelrieds may reflect their origin among the nobility by keeping a coat of arms (displaying a crescent in a triangle). A Jacob von Winkelried is recorded in 1343 as owning property in Ennetmoos, in 1372 a Peter Winkelried is the tenant of the possessions of Engelberg in Alpnach. In the 1382 uprising against the noble families in Unterwalden, the Winkelrieds seem to be affected because of their close connections to the aristocracy.

In a document dated 1 May 1367, one of the witnesses signs as Erni Winkelried. This is the only candidate on record for the historicity of Arnold Winkelried of patriotic legend. The first mention of Winkelried as the hero of Sempach dates to nearly a century later, in the time of the Burgundian Wars. But a man called Erni Winkelried is recorded again on 29 September 1389 and on 13 March 1396, after the battle where he supposedly died a hero's death. But yet another Erni Winkelried appears in 1417 and 1418 as amtmann of Nidwalden, so that there was clearly more than one person with this name, perhaps father and son. Yet another Arnold Winkelried is recorded in the second half of the 15th century, in connection of a lawsuit of November 1474 and as delegate of Nidwalden at the Swiss Diet on several occasions during 1476 to 1482. A Heinrich Winkelried recorded from 1456 was a member of the council of Nidwalden from before 1471 and delegate at the Diet during 1469 to 1498. A fourth Arnold Winkelried is recorded as delegate from 1496 to 1507. He was also a member of a Swiss delegation sent to emperor Maximilian in 1508 and as a captain in the battle of Novara in 1513. This Arnold is last recorded in 1524.

Yet another Arnold Winkelried, sometimes conflated with the aforementioned, was a notorious mercenary leader during the first quarter of the 16th century. He was knighted in 1514 by the Milanese duke Maximilian Sforza. On 13 September he was instigated by cardinal Schiner to engage in a skirmish with the French men-at-arms outside of Milano, thus causing the disastrous Battle of Marignano. In 1516 he marched against Milano in the Service of Maximilian, and defended Verona against the French. After the treaty of May 1517, Winkelried threatened to declare war on the king of France (who now also was the duke of Milan) privately because of the unpaid wages still owed by Sforza, the previous duke. After this dispute had been settled to his satisfaction, he entered French service in 1518 and participated in the 1521 campaign in Picardy in the rank of captain. In 1522, he commanded 16,000 Swiss mercenaries in French service invading Lombardy. At Bicocca he met with his former commander Georg von Frundsberg, who served on the imperial side. The two mercenary leaders engaged in single combat, and Winkelried was killed. It was later disputed among the Swiss serving on either side whether Winkelried had been killed by Frundsberg or whether he had been shot from the flank. Because the death of this Arnold Winkelried immediately predates the earliest printed references to the legendary hero of Sempach, some historians have suggested that the chroniclers of the early 16th century named the previously unnamed hero after the mercenary leader.

A son of Arnold's, Hans Winkelreid, died before 1532, and the name seems to have been extinct by 1550.
