= Wernher Steiner =

Wernher Steiner (1492–1542) was a chronicler of Zug. His writings are among the important sources for Swiss history during the first half of the 16th century.

As a military chaplain he witnessed the Battle of Marignano in 1515.

Most of Steiner's writing was not printed during his lifetime and survives in manuscript form, some of which were edited by his descendants in the 17th century.

== Works ==
- Chronicon Tugiense de anno 1503 usque ad annum 1516 (1530)
- Miscellanea historica Dr. Wernheri Steineri; conscripsit manu propria Trinepos suus Joh. Rodolphus Steinerus, Helvetio-Tigurinus anno 1667
- Kurtze historische Beschreybung vnd zwaren mehrtheilss in Liedern, kombt har von meinem Atavo oder Pfuchänj Hn. Wern. Steiner. Von Hanns Caspar Steiner dem Hanss Rudolff Steiner verehrt 1685

== Sources ==
- Melchior Kirchhofer, Wernher Steiner, Bürger von Zug und Zürich: eine Einladung zur Jubelfeyer der schweizerischen Reformation (1818)
