= Ennetmoos =

- Municipality
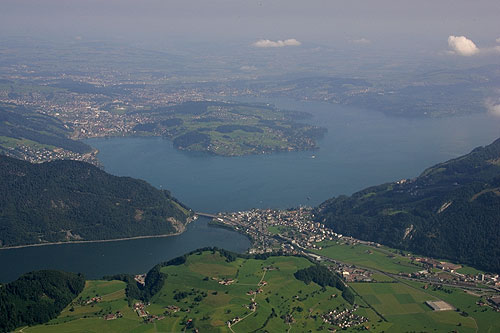

- Flag Coat of arms
- Location of Ennetmoos
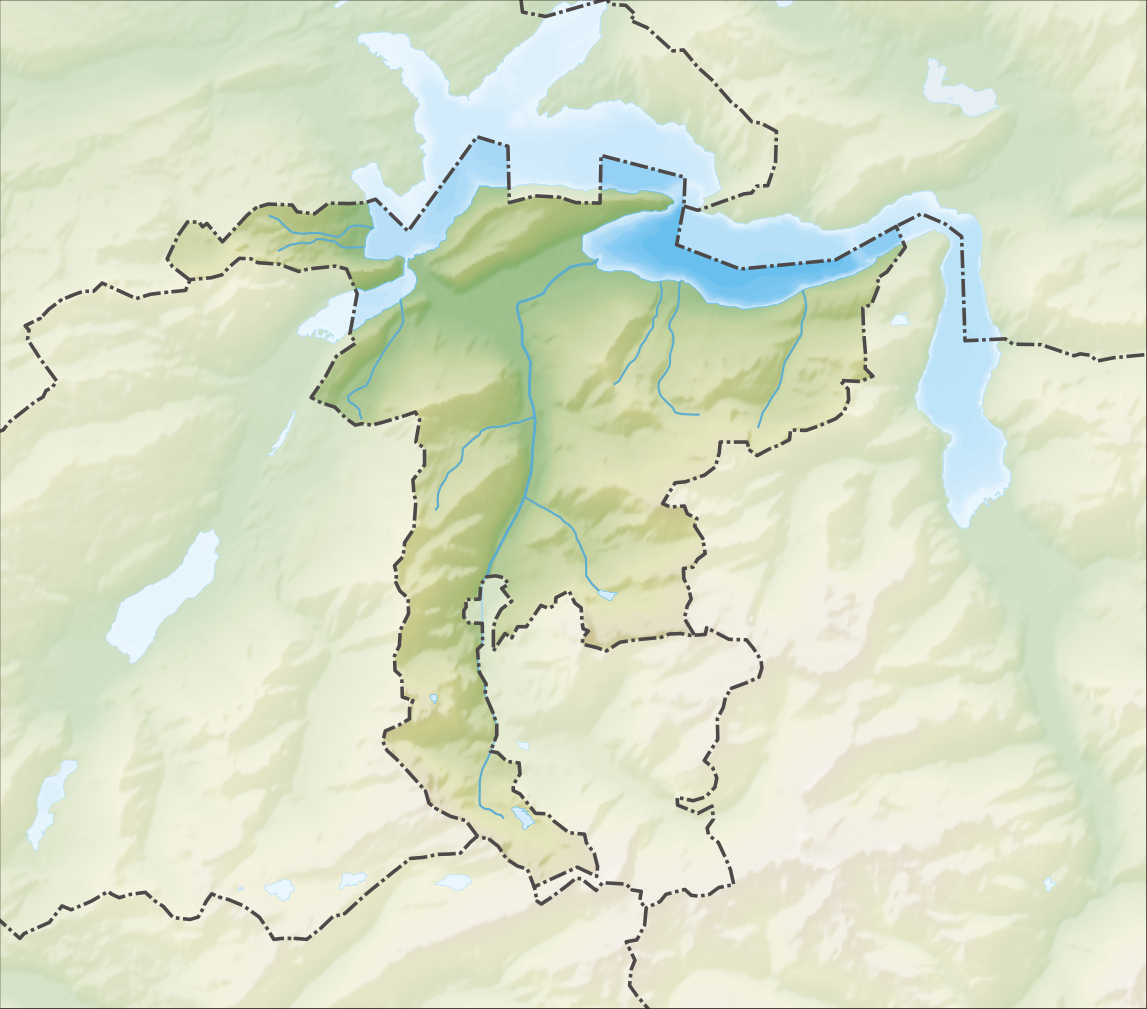
- Location within Switzerland Location within Canton of Nidwalden
- Coordinates: 46°57′N 8°20′E
- Country: Switzerland
- Canton: Nidwalden
- District: n.a.

Area
  - Total: 14.95 km^{2} (5.77 sq mi)
- Elevation: 521 m (1,709 ft)

Population (December 2020)
  - Total: 2,254
  - Density: 150.8/km^{2} (390.5/sq mi)
- Time zone: UTC+01:00 (CET)
  - Summer (DST): UTC+02:00 (CEST)
- Postal code: 6372
- SFOS number: 1506
- ISO 3166 code: CH-NW
- Surrounded by: Alpnach (OW), Dallenwil, Kerns (OW), Stans, Stansstad
- Website: www.ennetmoos.ch

Ennetmoos is a municipality in the canton of Nidwalden in Switzerland.

== History ==
Ennetmoos is first mentioned in 1311 or 1315 as Ennetmooss.

The dragon in the municipality's coat of arms is inspired by the legend of Strut von Winkelried, as the home castle of the Winkelrieds of the 13th century has been placed in the municipality's territory.

== Geography ==
Aerial view from 2000 m by Walter Mittelholzer (1925)

Ennetmoos has an area, as of 2006, of 14.1 square kilometers (5.4 sq mi). Of this area, 47.9% is used for agricultural purposes, while 43.9% is forested. Of the rest of the land, 5.7% is settled (buildings or roads) and the remainder (2.4%) is non-productive (rivers, glaciers or mountains).

It consists of the village of Ennetmoos and the hamlets of St. Jakob, Rohren, Allweg/Grueb and Rotzloch.

== Demographics ==
Ennetmoos has a population (as of 31 December 2020) of 2,254. As of 2007, 7.7% of the population was made up of foreign nationals. Over the last 10 years the population has grown at a rate of 6.5%. Most of the population (as of 2000) speaks German (94.8%), with Serbo-Croatian being second most common ( 1.4%) and Italian being third ( 1.1%). As of 2008 the gender distribution of the population was 52.0% male and 48.0% female.

As of 2000 there are 671 households, of which 364 households (or about 54.2%) contain only one or two individuals. 92 or about 13.7% are large households, with at least five members.

In the 2007 federal election the most popular party was the FDP which received 90% of the vote. Most of the rest of the votes went to local small right-wing parties (9.3%).

The entire Swiss population is generally well educated. In Ennetmoos about 72% of the population (between age 25-64) have completed either non-mandatory upper secondary education or additional higher education (either university or a Fachhochschule).

Ennetmoos has an unemployment rate of 0.85%. As of 2005, there were 182 people employed in the primary economic sector and about 63 businesses involved in this sector. 376 people are employed in the secondary sector, and there are 16 businesses in this sector. 134 people are employed in the tertiary sector, with 33 businesses in this sector.

The historical population is given in the following table:

year	population
1850	712
1880	689
1888	763
1900	699
1950	849
1980	1,347
1990	1,763
2000	1,915
2005	1,953

== Sights ==
The main sights of Ennetmoos are: the church St. Jakob, the chapel St. Leonhard in Rohren, the chapel St. Magnus in Allweg, a monument (Überfalldenkmal) in Allweg, ruins at Rotzberg, the Stanserhorn mountain and resort, and the pilgrimage route St. Jakobsweg.
