= History of Uri =

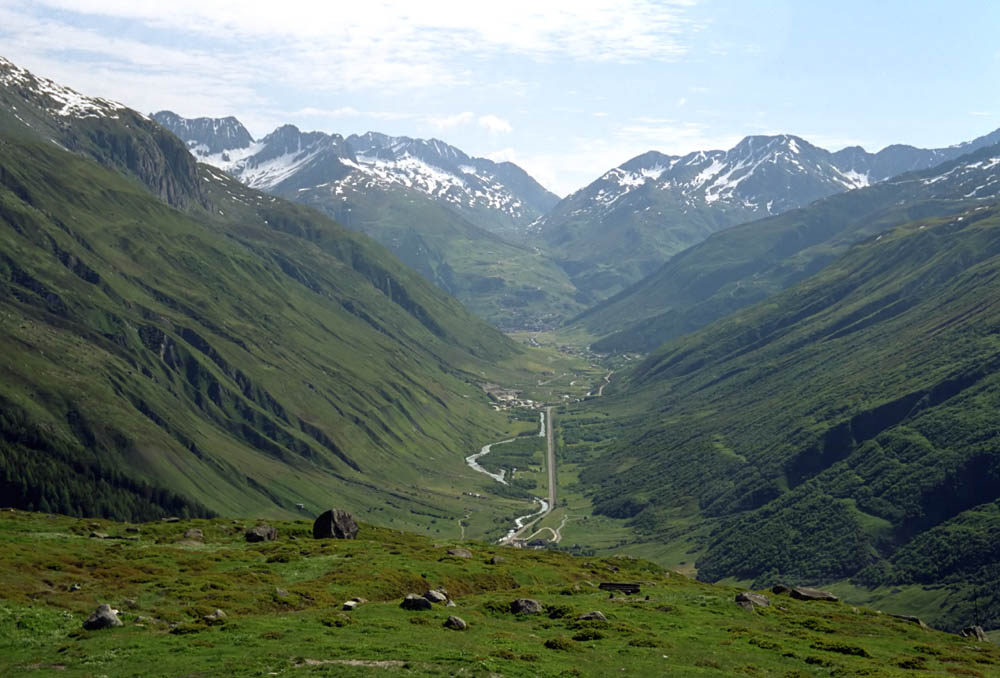
The valley Urseren from the Furka Pass

Uri is a Swiss Talschaft and canton in the upper Reuss valley.

First mentioned in the 8th century, it gained strategic importance with the opening of the Gotthard Pass in the 13th century and was a founding member of the Old Swiss Confederacy in the late medieval period.

== Prehistory ==
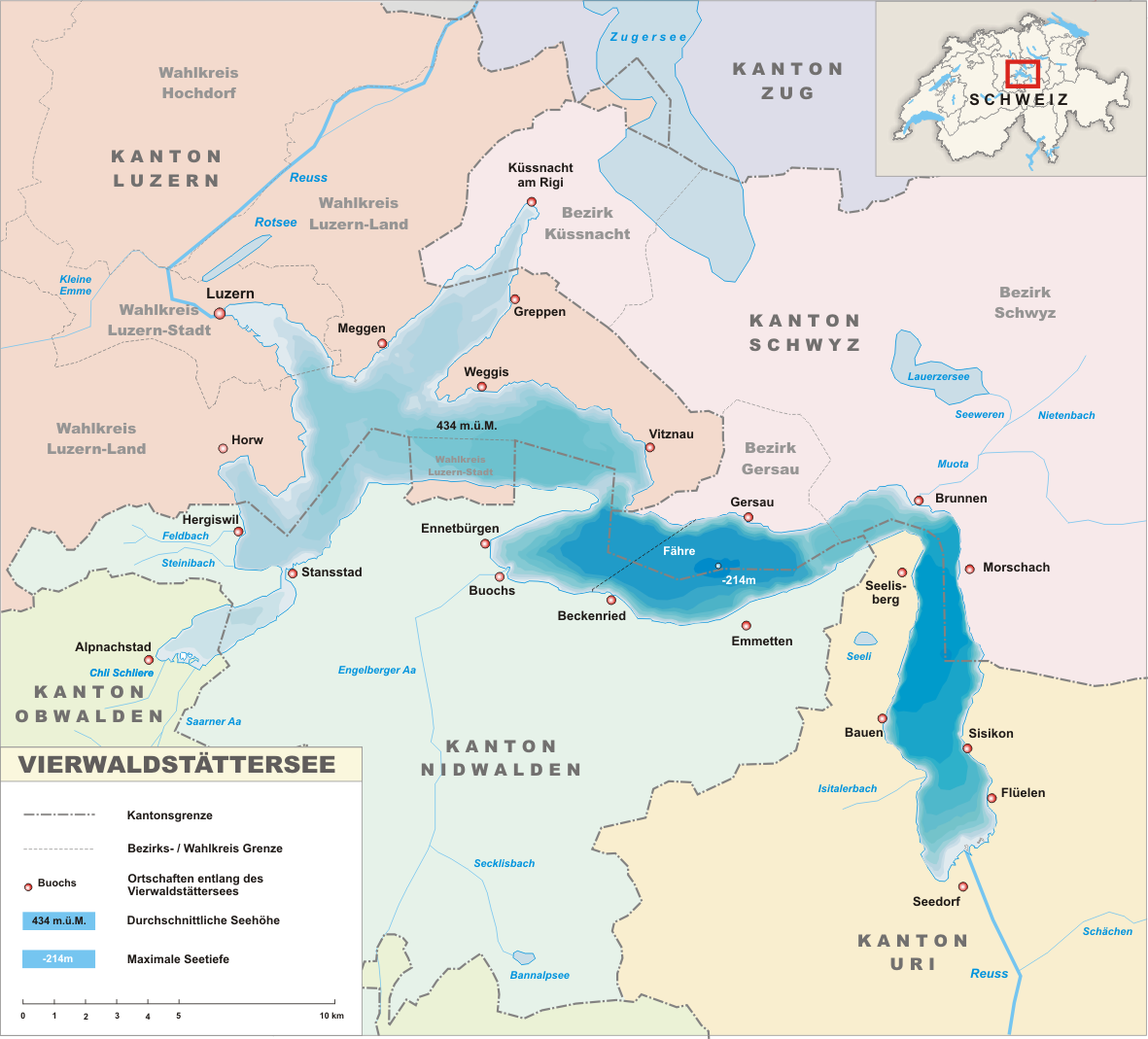
Lake Lucerne with Canton Uri at the southernmost point in the lake

The oldest traces of humans in the Canton of Uri are from around 2200 BC and include a quartz production site and flint arrowheads at Hospental-Rossplatten and Gotthardmätteli. There are Bronze Age graves at Bürglen and possibly also some at Jagdmatt that are from 1300–900 BC. The earliest traces of a settlement were discovered at Amsteg and date from the Middle Bronze Age (1450–1200 BC). This village was located in a protected valley along a route into the Reuss and was near quartz, copper and iron deposits. An Iron Age village was built in the same spot around 500–450 BC. Pottery from the Bronze and Iron Ages show that these villages traded with surrounding villages and even crossed the alpine passes to trade with Quinto in Ticino and the alpine Rhine valley. The large Celtic treasure trove at Erstfeld, now generally interpreted as a votive offering to a mountain deity, indicates that there was a large, prosperous population in central alps during the 4th century BC.

== Early history ==
During the Roman era, Uri remained mostly isolated from the Roman Empire. An analysis of the place names along the shores of Lake Lucerne show a Gallo-Roman influence, while in the mountain valleys Raetian names are more common. When the Roman Empire withdrew from the Alps, the lake side villages looked north to the towns along the lake for support, while the alpine villages in the valley called Urseren banded together.

During the 7th century, Alemannic German speaking settlers from the Kingdom of the Franks began to move into the narrow plains around the southern end of Lake Lucerne. In a process that took about three centuries they spread into the alpine valleys. The number of place names with either German or Latin roots next to each other indicates that this migration was generally peaceful. The Alemanni grave at the church of St. Martin in Altdorf (660–680) shows the political and religious leadership roll that the Alemanni had in the upper Reuss valley.

Uri is first mentioned in 732 as the place of banishment of Eto, the abbot of Reichenau, by the duke of Alamannia. In 853 it was given to the nunnery at Zürich by Louis the German, which he had founded for his daughter Hildegard. It is unclear whether the gift included the entire Reuss valley or just certain settlements. The abbess appointed a vogt to manage the lands, but ruled the lands with a light hand. Many of the surrounding villages became tenants of the abbey or obtained similar privileges. Under the abbess, the villages of the valley began to develop a sort of local government.

In contrast, the Urseren remained more isolated, though they had some connections to the Leventina valley. Some of the villages in the Urseren were settled by Disentis Abbey and were part of the Diocese of Chur. By the 10th century, there were settlements of Romansh speakers from Disentis in the high valleys.

Between approximately 920 and 976 the Duke of Swabia was the vogt under the abbess in Zurich. They were followed by the Lenzburgs from 976 to 1173 and then the Zähringens. In 1218, the Zähringens died out, and the bailiwick was given to the Habsburgs. According to Aegidius Tschudi's history, in 1231 King Henry of Germany, the son of Emperor Frederick II, bought Uri from the Habsburgs and granted it imperial immediacy. During the 13th century, the St. Gotthard Pass opened, which brought ever increasing trade and wealth to Uri. With the growing wealth, the towns and villages along the Gotthard route became increasing independent. As early as 1243 Uri had a district seal, and in 1274, Rudolph of Habsburg, who was now the Holy Roman Emperor, confirmed its historic privileges.

In Urseren, Disentis Abbey appointed a vogt, though in 1239–40 Emperor Frederick II changed the vogt's office into a secular, imperial office. He appointed Count Rudolf of Rapperswil as his vogt. When the Rapperswil male line died out in 1283 the vogt office in Urseren also fell to the Habsburgs.

== Old Swiss Confederacy ==
=== Formation of the Confederacy ===
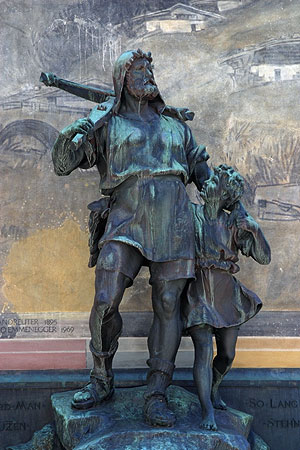
Tell Monument in Altdorf

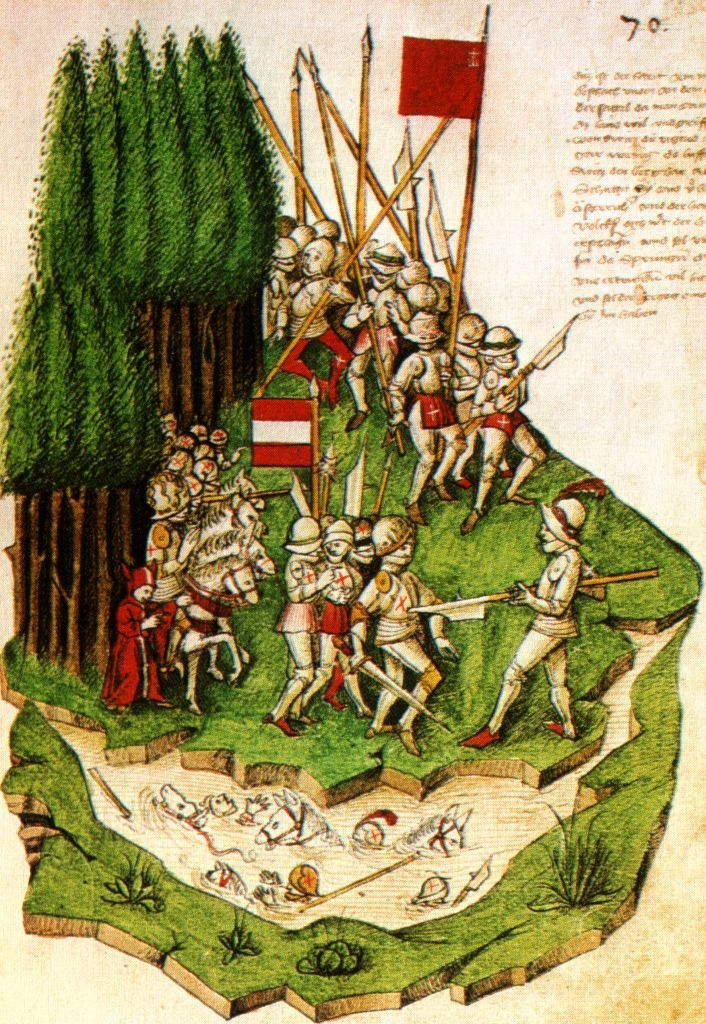
Battle of Morgarten

A treaty of mutual recognition and assistance with Schwyz, possibly concluded in 1291 and certainly by 1309, would come to be regarded as the foundational act of the Old Swiss Confederacy or Eidgenossenschaft. The Battle of Morgarten in 1315, while of limited strategic importance, was the first instance of the Confererates defeating the Habsburgs in the field. A few months after the victory at Morgarten, the three Forest Cantons met at Brunnen to reaffirm their alliance in the Pact of Brunnen. Over the following decades, the Confederacy expanded into the Acht Orte, now representing a regional power with the potential to challenge Habsburg hegemony. The Confederacy decisively defeated Habsburg in the Battle of Sempach 1386, opening the way to further territorial expansion.

In the traditional history of the Eternal Alliance, the Habsburgs had appointed a tyrannical vogt named Albrecht Gessler to rule over Uri from his castle in Altdorf. According to Tschudi's version of the events (recorded in the 16th century) Gessler raised a pole in the village's central square, hung his hat on top of it, and demanded that all the townsfolk bow before the hat. On 18 November 1307, William Tell visited Altdorf with his young son and passed by Gessler's hat, publicly refusing to bow to it, and so was arrested. Gessler – intrigued by Tell's famed marksmanship, yet resentful of his defiance – devised a cruel punishment: Tell and his son would be executed, but he could redeem his life by shooting an apple off the head of his son, Walter, in a single attempt. Tell split the apple with a bolt from his crossbow. However, Gessler noticed that Tell had drawn two bolts and discovered that Tell had planned to kill him if the first bolt had killed Tell's son. Gessler took Tell captive, but Tell was able to escape. Tell then ran cross-country to Küssnacht where he assassinated Gessler with the second crossbow bolt. Tell's assassination sparked a rebellion, which led to the Rütlischwur, a further alliance between Uri, Schwyz and Unterwalden.

While the historicity of William Tell and specific events are questioned by modern historians, the cantons around Lake Lucerne and other nearby lakes had a long history of alliances. For example, in 1291, Uri, Schwyz and Zürich entered into a three-year defensive alliance. In 1309, Emperor Henry VII combined Uri, Schwyz and Unterwalden into the Waldstätte or Forest Cantons.

In 1314, Duke Louis IV of Bavaria (who would become Louis IV, Holy Roman Emperor) and Frederick the Handsome, a Habsburg prince, each claimed the crown of the Holy Roman Emperor. The Confederates supported Louis IV because they feared the Habsburgs would annex their countries as Habsburg property — as they already had tried to do in the late 13th century.

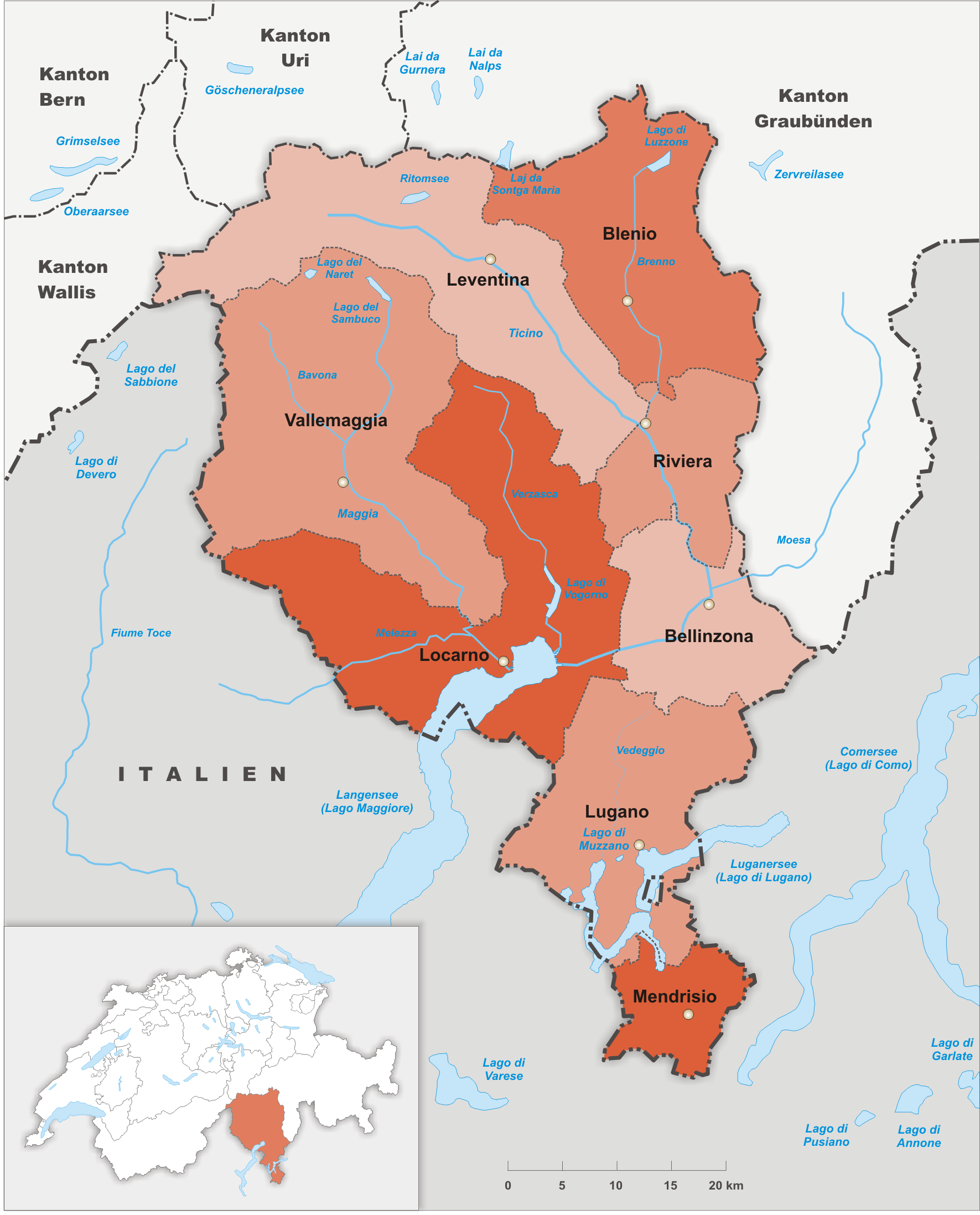
Districts of Ticino, showing the Leventina, Blenio, Bellinzona and Riviera districts

War broke out over a dispute between the Confederates of Schwyz and the Habsburg-protected monastery of Einsiedeln regarding some pastures, and eventually the Confederates of Schwyz conducted a raid on the monastery. The Habsburg response to the raid, led to the Battle of Morgarten in 1315 where the Confederate army, including some troops from Uri, destroyed the Habsburg army. A few months after the victory at Morgarten, the three Forest Cantons met at Brunnen to reaffirm their alliance in the Pact of Brunnen. In the following forty years, the alliance expanded as other cantons (Lucerne in 1332 and Zürich in 1351, Glarus and Zug in 1352 and Bern in 1353) joined the alliance.

In 1386 Uri participated in the victory over the Austrians at the Battle of Sempach. Following the victory at Sempach, Uri began a program of territorial expansion to allow them to control the entire Gotthard route. As a first step, Uri annexed the lands of Urseren in 1410. The Urseren was allowed to retain its own mayor and assembly, and its own courts under those of Uri. It was not fully incorporated till 1888. In 1403, with the help of Obwalden, it won the Leventina valley from the duke of Milan, but lost it in 1422. Though in 1440 Uri alone reconquered it and kept it until 1798. Between 1410 and 1418, Uri occupied the Val d' Ossola in Italy. In 1419, with Obwalden, Uri conquered Bellinzona, but lost it at the Battle of Arbedo in 1422. In 1478, Uri marched into the Leventina valley, south of the Gotthard pass. The citizens of the valley welcomed Uri's troops as liberators from the Duke of Milan. They then attempted to besiege Bellinzona, but gave up after 14 days, when the Duke sent 10,000 troops to drive them out. About 600 men of the Confederate rear guard defeated the Milanese army at the Battle of Giornico and drove Milan out of the Leventina valley but did not take Bellinzona. In 1500, with Schwyz and Nidwalden, it captured Bellinzona again and held it until 1798. By 1503, Uri, Nidwalden and Schwyz jointly controlled the bailiwicks of Blenio, Bellinzona and Riviera. In 1512 Uri shared in the conquest of Lugano with the rest of the Confederation. Together with the rest of the Confederation, Uri shared in the conquest and rule over a number of subject territories under the administration of several cantons including; 1415–1712 Baden, 1460–1798 Thurgau, 1482–1798 Sargans, 1491–1798 Rheintal, 1512–1798 Locarno, the Maggia valley, Lugano and Mendrisio and 1532–1712 the Freiamt including the Upper Freiamt between 1712–98.

=== Reformation and early modern era ===
The second battle of Kappel allowed Uri to choose to remain Roman Catholic, but allowed religious freedom in Switzerland

The region resisted the Protestant Reformation and remained Roman Catholic. In 1524–25 the Landammann Beroldingen of Josue asked the cantonal scribe Valentin Compar to write a polemic against the reformer Huldrych Zwingli, which was read to the cantonal congress and approved. As the Reformation spread through the Swiss Confederation, the five central, catholic cantons felt increasingly isolated and they began to search for allies. After two months of negotiations, the Five Cantons formed die Christliche Vereinigung (the Christian Alliance) with Ferdinand of Austria on 22 April 1529. Tensions continued to rise between the Protestant and Catholic cantons. After numerous minor incidents and provocations from both sides, a Catholic priest was executed in the Thurgau in May 1528, and the Protestant pastor J. Keyser was burned at the stake in Schwyz in 1529. The last straw was the installation of a Catholic reeve at Baden, and Zürich declared war on 8 June, occupied the Thurgau and the territories of the Abbey of St. Gall and marched to Kappel at the border to Zug.

By mediation of the Federal Tagsatzung, bloodshed in what was known as the First War of Kappel was barely avoided. The peace agreement (Erster Landfriede) was not exactly favourable for the Catholic party, who had to dissolve its alliance with the Austrian Habsburgs. The Protestant cantons also demanded that the catholic cantons allow Protestant preachers into them, and imposed a trade embargo to try to force them to agree. In late September 1531, about 8,000 soldiers from the Five Cantons (including Uri) marched against Zurich and Zwingli to lift this embargo. When they met Zwingli's forces on 11 October 1531 at the Second War of Kappel, the catholic forces were victorious and Zwingli was killed. The peace treaty after the Second War of Kappel established that each canton could choose which religion to follow, and Uri remained Catholic.

During the early modern era, the population of Uri increased slowly. The limited arable land in mountain valleys, disease and crop failures all reduced population growth. The plague broke out in the canton in 1348–49, 1517–18, 1574–75 and 1629. In 1742–43 and again 1770–71, crop failures combined with cattle diseases led to starvation and mass emigration. The consequences for the population were severe, in 1743 Uri had 9,828 inhabitants, but by the end of the 18th Century there were only 9,464 people.

== Modern history ==
=== Napoleonic period ===
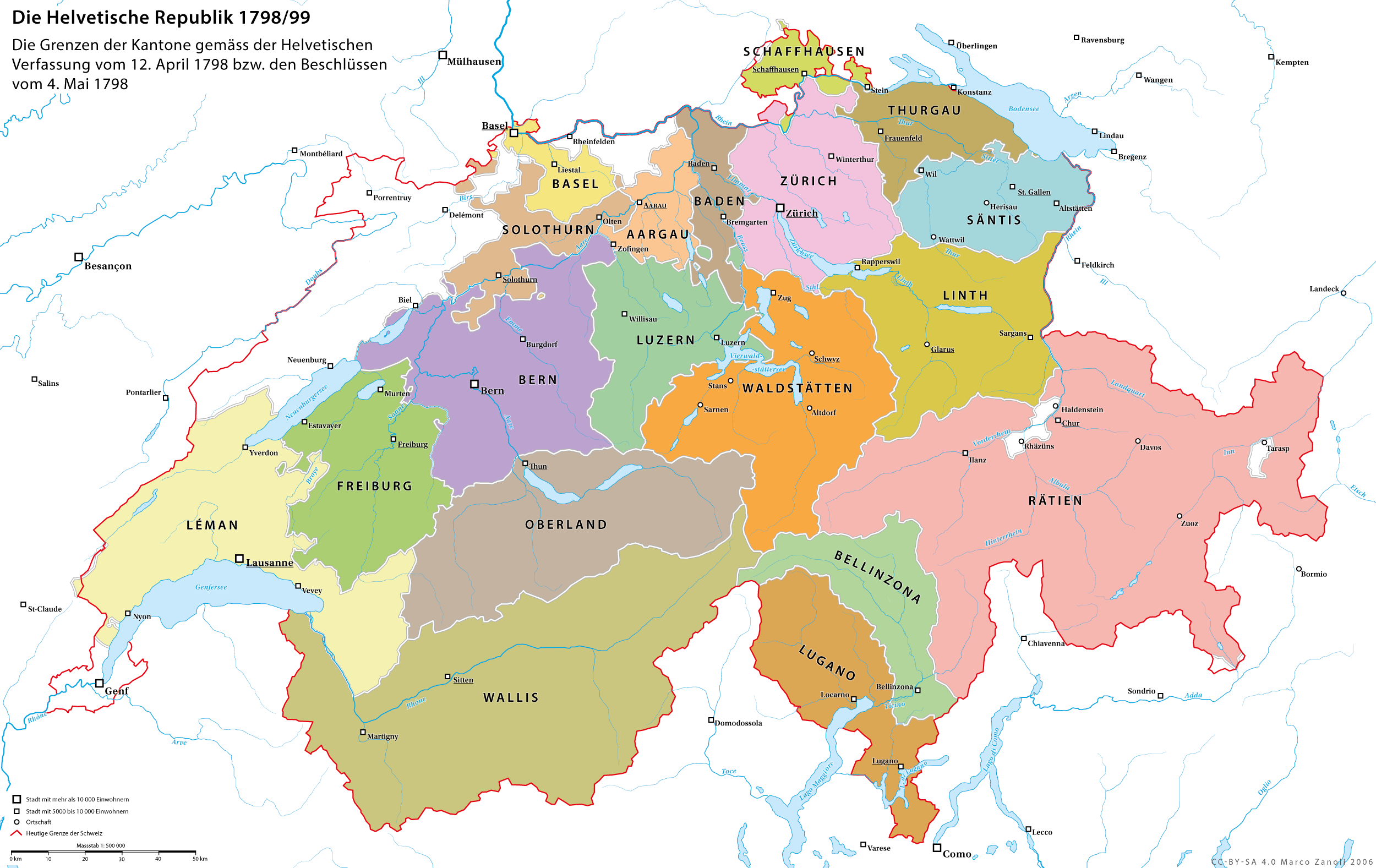
Map of the Helvetic Republic

The government of Uri spoke out against the ideals of the French Revolution and opposed any attempt to institute changes in Switzerland. In 1797, pro-revolutionary propaganda from France was intercepted and burned in Uri. In January 1798, French revolutionary forces invaded Switzerland. On 28 January 1798, Uri sent troops to support Bern against the invaders. However, in early March it advised the Bernese authorities to make concessions to the French government. Then on 4 and 5 March, Uri's troops refused to join the battle and instead withdrew. At the conference in Brunnen on 11 March Uri, Schwyz, Nidwalden, Glarus and Zug decided to negotiate a separate peace with General Guillaume Brune. In preparation for these talks the council dissolved their protectorate over the Leventina valley on 14 March. In the following days, the negotiations fell through because the French insisted on creating an indivisible Swiss republic. On 11 April the victorious French announced the creation of the Helvetic Republic and gave the cantons twelve days to accept the new constitution. On 20 April, the council voted to defend the traditional constitution and to join the rebellious cantons of Schwyz, Nidwalden, Glarus and Zug. The uprising was quickly suppressed and on 5 May Uri agreed to accept the Helvetic Republic. The cantonal army was disarmed in September and the canton was occupied by French troops in October.

During the Helvetic Republic, Uri was part of the Canton of Waldstätten, along with Zug, Obwalden, Nidwalden and the inner portions of Schwyz. The Leventina valley was given to the Canton of Ticino, which stripped Uri of its lands south of the Gotthard pass. Uri was divided into two districts, Andermatt and Altdorf. The government of Andermatt district supported the new, liberal constitution, while the government and people of Altdorf district opposed it. In April and May 1799, Franz Vincenz Schmid led an uprising against the occupying French army. This revolt, which gained support from the Leventina and Valais valleys, failed because they were unable to coordinate simultaneous uprisings in the other alpine cantons. After the uprising was put down, the victorious General Nicolas Jean-de-Dieu Soult granted the people of Uri clemency for the rebellion.

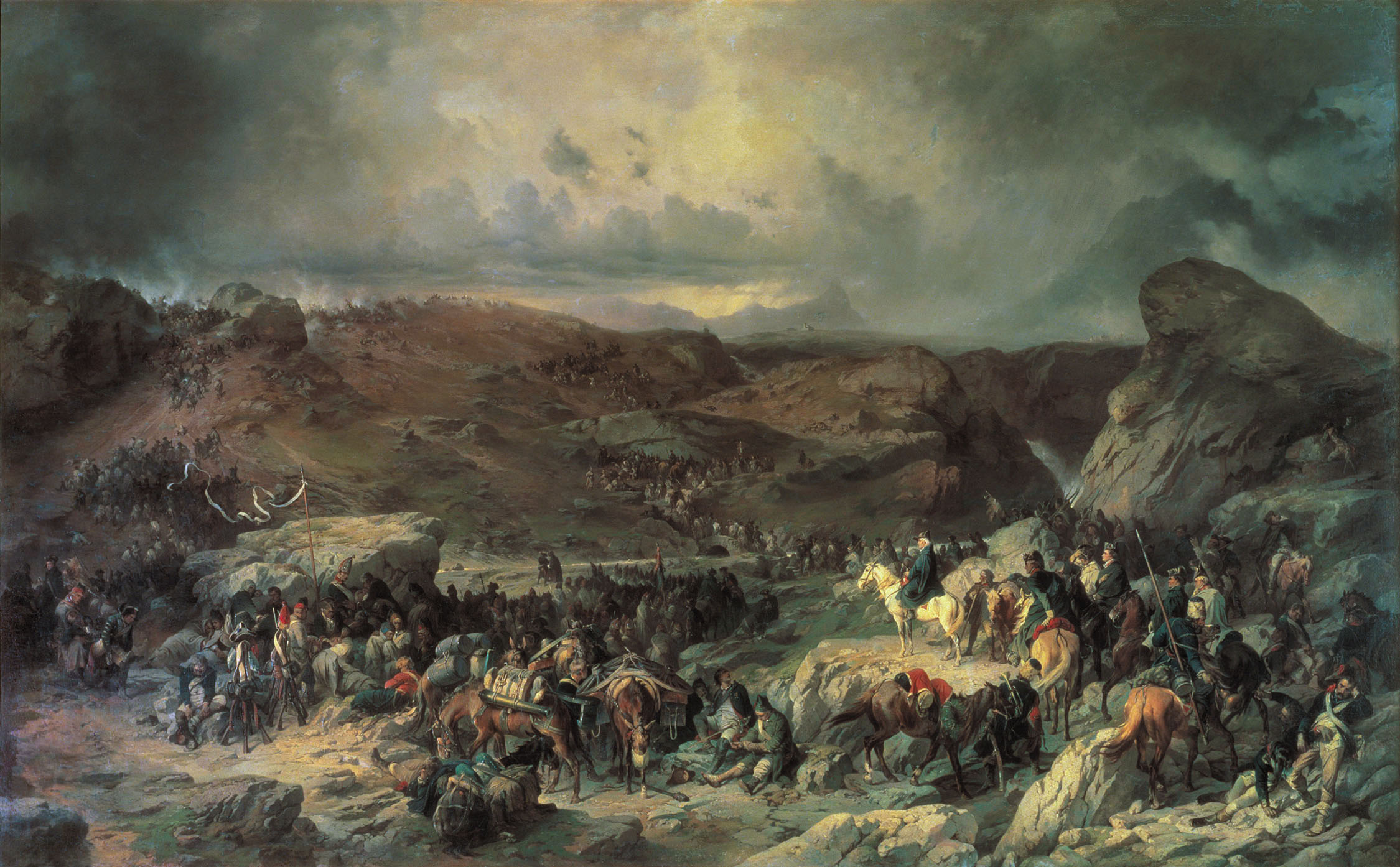
Suvorov Crossing the St. Gotthard Pass, an Alexander Kotzebue painting

From June until the end of September 1799, troops of the Second Coalition fought the French in Uri. In connection with the uprising, Austrian troops invaded the Urseren and Reuss Valleys in late May and early June. The Austrians, together with a Capuchin friar named Paul Styger, attempted to restore the old cantonal government. However, in August the French position in the war began to improve. With the defeat of the Russian general Alexander Korsakov at the Second Battle of Zurich, the only other Coalition army, under Alexander Suvorov, was forced to retreat out of Switzerland though the alps in winter, a feat unheard of since the time of Hannibal. While he is considered a folk hero in Switzerland, his army stripped the villages of Uri bare of food and cattle. The damage from fighting, Suvorov's retreat and other disasters (including a fire that destroyed much of Altdorf in 1799) caused a famine in Uri. Although the government commissioner, Heinrich Zschokke, organized a relief effort to prevent starvation, it took years for Uri to repair the damage to the villages and towns.

In October 1801, a new government came to power in the Helvetic Republic and in early November the Canton of Waldstätten was dissolved and Uri became a canton again. The governor, Josef Anton von Beroldingen, attempted unsuccessfully to bring the Leventina valley back into Uri. Half a year later, on 17 April 1802, the Unitarian party took power back in the Republic and revised the constitution once again. In early June, Uri rejected the newest constitution while at the same time French troops withdrew from Switzerland. Without the French army to suppress them, Uri and other rural populations successfully rebelled against the government in the Stecklikrieg. In response to the collapse of the Helvetic Republic, Napoleon issued the Act of Mediation in 1803. As part of the Act of Mediation, Uri regained its independence and all attempts towards religious or constitutional reform were resisted.

=== Toward the federal state ===
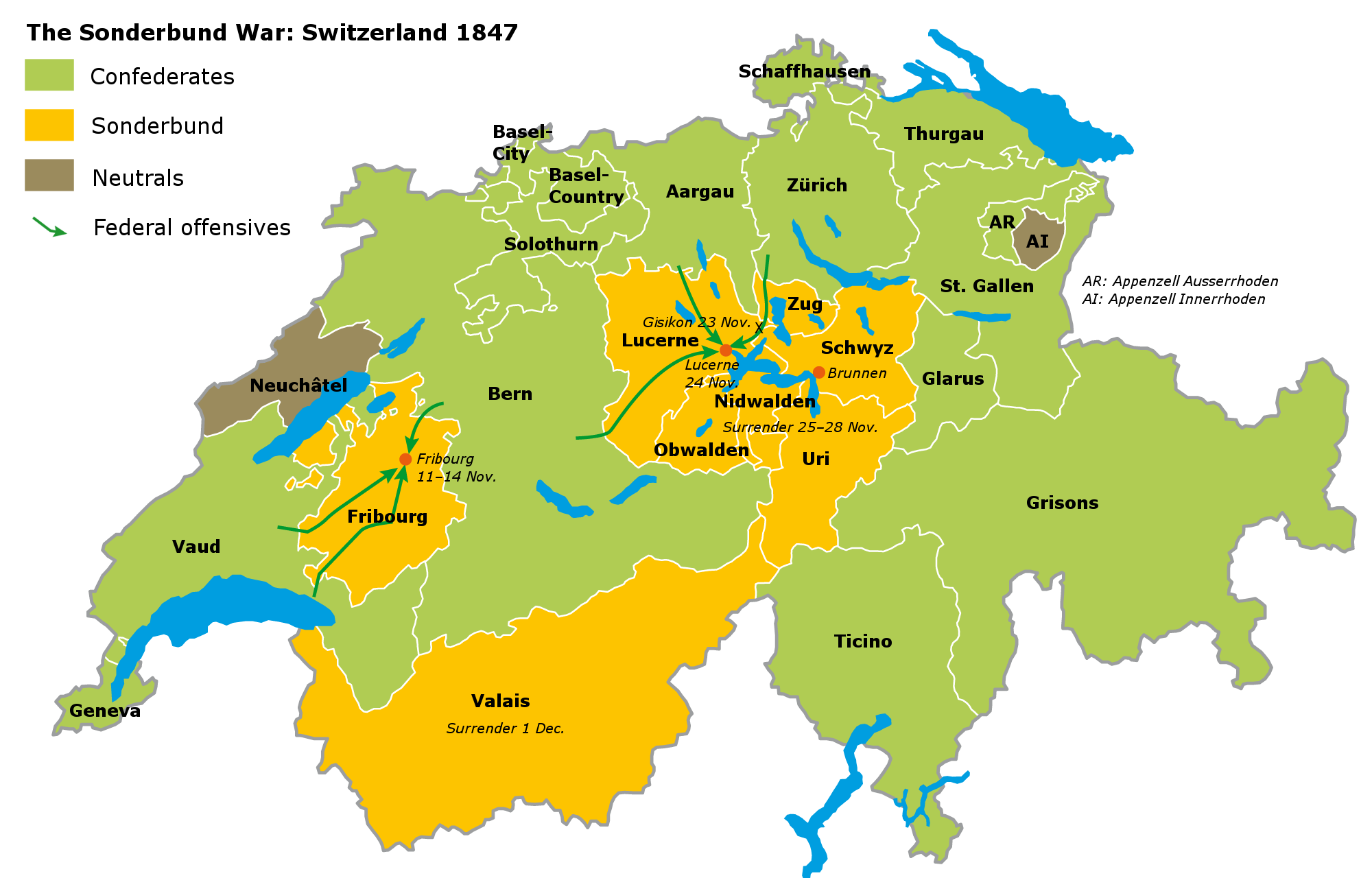
The Sonderbund War, Yellow – Sonderbund, Green – Confederates, Grey – Neutral

After the invasion of the Sixth Coalition into Switzerland on 29 December 1813, the Act of Mediation lost its power. While the neighbouring cantons of Schwyz and Nidwalden wanted to return to the organization of the Old Swiss Confederation, Uri was part of the Zurich-led party, which sought to reorganize the 19 cantons created by the Act. Uri also attempted, unsuccessful, to reincorporate the Leventina valley, but was only able to receive the rights to one-half of the taxes on all trade over Monte Piottino into the Leventina. On 5 May 1815 the Landsgemeinde approved the federal constitution. Uri then mediated between the Tagsatzung and Nidwalden, which had refused to recognize the treaty.

Uri remained without an official constitution until 1820. The document included only six principles that were based on traditional practice and existing state laws. The government remained deeply conservative during the Restoration period. Discontent with the cantonal government collected until 1834 when a reform party demanded a number of liberal constitutional changes. The Landsgemeinde, however, rejected these calls for reform. In the 1840s, urban, Protestant liberals gained the majority in the Tagsatzung and proposed a new constitution. To protect their traditional religion and power structure, the seven conservative, catholic cantons formed a separate alliance or Sonderbund in 1843. In 1847, the Sonderbund broke with the Federal Government and the Sonderbund War broke out. During the conflict, Uri sent troops to participate in the fighting along the Reuss-Emme defensive line as well as on the foray over the Gotthard into Ticino. After the defeat of the Sonderbund troops in Gisikon on 23 November 1847 Uri withdrew from the alliance and surrendered on 28 November 1847. Two days later federal troops moved into Uri.

=== Within modern Switzerland ===
After the defeat of the Sonderbund, Uri supported the new Swiss Federal Constitution. They established a cantonal constitution that included some liberal changes including; the abolition of lifetime alderman positions, eliminating the privy council and secret council meetings and the establishment of a provisional executive council. The Landsgemeinde was the supreme sovereign power. The Cantonal Council, which included the presiding government councils and the Cantonal Court President, and the eleven-member Executive Council formed the legislative and executive branches. Ecclesiastical and school matters were under the Diocesan and Education Committees. The Catholic Church continued to enjoy privileges, but freedom of worship was now available for other faiths. The overall structure of the state remained cumbersome, because of the numerous commissions and the poor separation of powers.

The new Federal Constitution of 1874, which was rejected by the voters of Uri, led to a total revision of the cantonal constitution in 1888. The new constitution streamlined the government and addressed many of the issues of the 1848 cantonal constitution. The Landsgemeinde continued to meet on a local level until the last one was held in Bötzlingen in the municipality of Schattdorf on 6 May 1928. The Christian Democratic Party (CVP) and the Free Democratic Party (FDP) have dominated politics in Uri during the 20th Century.
