= List of cultural property of national significance in Switzerland: Schwyz =

This list contains all cultural property of national significance (class A) in the canton of Schwyz from the 2009 Swiss Inventory of Cultural Property of National and Regional Significance. It is sorted by municipality and contains 49 individual buildings, 8 collections, 10 archaeological finds and 1 other, special site or object.

The geographic coordinates provided are in the Swiss coordinate system as given in the Inventory.

== Altendorf ==
KGS No.^{?}	Picture	Name	Street Address	CH1903 X coordinate	CH1903 Y coordinate	Location
10482		Alt Rapperswil, Castle Site		706.300	226.950	47.184953°N 8.841181°E
4763	St. Johann Chapel and Sigristen House	St. Johann Chapel and Sigristen House	Burgweg 28	706.300	226.950	47.184953°N 8.841181°E
Unknown		ISOS Weiler: Seestatt				

== Arth ==
KGS No.^{?}	Picture	Name	Street Address	CH1903 X coordinate	CH1903 Y coordinate	Location
11625	Alte Post Haus	Alte Post Haus	Gotthardstrasse 29	683.280	212.238	47.055932°N 8.534784°E
10175	High Platform of the Rigibahn	High Platform of the Rigibahn	Bahnhofstrasse	684.278	211.499	47.049159°N 8.54778°E
11626	Reding Chapel	Reding Chapel	Gotthardstrasse 25	683.224	212.313	47.056614°N 8.53406°E
9673	Medieval Letzinen	Medieval Letzinen		683.260	212.280	47.056312°N 8.534528°E
4766	Parish Church of St. Georg and Zeno	Parish Church of St. Georg and Zeno		682.380	213.080	47.063618°N 8.523092°E
Unknown		ISOS Dorf: Arth				

== Einsiedeln ==
KGS No.^{?}	Picture	Name	Street Address	CH1903 X coordinate	CH1903 Y coordinate	Location
9309	Library of the Werner Oechslin Foundation	Library of the Werner Oechslin Foundation	Luegetenstrasse 11	699.321	220.179	47.125142°N 8.747626°E
8913, 8520/extendedHtmlPopup 4774, 8913, 8520	Einsiedeln Abbey	Einsiedeln Abbey		699.700	220.370	47.126803°N 8.752663°E
9400	Zur Ilge House	Zur Ilge House	Schwanenstrasse 44	699.488	220.303	47.126232°N 8.749854°E
4778	Meinrads Chapel and St. Meinrad Pilgrims' House	Meinrads Chapel and St. Meinrad Pilgrims' House		701.101	225.55	47.173177°N 8.772284°E
4777	Teufelsbrücke am Etzel	Teufelsbrücke am Etzel		700.730	224.900	47.167388°N 8.767246°E
Unknown		ISOS Kleinstadt / Flecken: Einsiedeln				
Unknown		ISOS ISOS Spezialfall: Etzelpass, St. Meinrad				

== Freienbach ==
KGS No.^{?}	Picture	Name	Street Address	CH1903 X coordinate	CH1903 Y coordinate	Location
9669	Hurden / Seedamm, Prehistoric & Historic Bridge	Hurden / Seedamm, Prehistoric & Historic Bridge		703.750	230.680	47.218903°N 8.808402°E
4787	Parish church of St. Peter and Paul and Martinskapelle	Parish church of St. Peter and Paul and Martinskapelle	Ufnau	701.500	230.540	47.217993°N 8.77867°E
8514	Seedamm Cultural Center - Pfäffikon	Seedamm Cultural Center - Pfäffikon	Gwattstrasse 15 / Talstrasse	702.710	228.641	47.200728°N 8.794209°E
4788	Stiftsstatthalterei with Castle Tower and moat	Stiftsstatthalterei with Castle Tower and moat	Unterdorfstrasse	701.236	229.051	47.204642°N 8.774851°E
9670	Ufnau, Prehistoric Lake Shore Settlement / Roman era temple / Medieval settlement	Ufnau, Prehistoric Lake Shore Settlement / Roman era temple / Medieval settlement		701.500	230.540	47.217993°N 8.77867°E
Unknown		ISOS Spezialfall: Pfäffikon Unterdorf				
Unknown		ISOS Spezialfall: Insel Ufnau				

== Galgenen ==
KGS No.^{?}	Picture	Name	Street Address	CH1903 X coordinate	CH1903 Y coordinate	Location
4795	St. Jost Chapel	St. Jost Chapel		708.791	226.265	47.178387°N 8.873876°E
4794	Catholic Parish Church of St. Martin	Catholic Parish Church of St. Martin		708.820	226.700	47.182294°N 8.874363°E
Unknown		ISOS Verstädtertes Dorf: Siebnen Galgenen				

== Gersau ==
KGS No.^{?}	Picture	Name	Street Address	CH1903 X coordinate	CH1903 Y coordinate	Location
4799	Parish Church of St. Marzellus	Parish Church of St. Marzellus	Grandstrasse	682.960	205.040	46.991232°N 8.529256°E
Unknown		ISOS Dorf: Gersau				

== Ingenbohl ==
KGS No.^{?}	Picture	Name	Street Address	CH1903 X coordinate	CH1903 Y coordinate	Location
Unknown		ISOS Verstädtertes Dorf: Brunnen				

== Küssnacht ==
KGS No.^{?}	Picture	Name	Street Address	CH1903 X coordinate	CH1903 Y coordinate	Location
4813	Ruins of the Gesslerburg Castle	Ruins of the Gesslerburg Castle	Seebodenstrasse	676.700	215.050	47.082018°N 8.448663°E
4815	Hohle Gasse with Tell Chapel	Hohle Gasse with Tell Chapel	Hohle Gasse	677.027	216.231	47.092602°N 8.453169°E
Unknown		ISOS Kleinstadt / Flecken: Küssnacht am Rigi				
Unknown		ISOS Weiler: Merlischachen				

== Lachen ==
KGS No.^{?}	Picture	Name	Street Address	CH1903 X coordinate	CH1903 Y coordinate	Location
4823	Catholic Parish Church of Heilig-Kreuz	Catholic Parish Church of Heilig-Kreuz	Kirchplatz	707.020	227.790	47.192391°N 8.850879°E
Unknown		ISOS Kleinstadt / Flecken: Lachen				

== Morschach ==
KGS No.^{?}	Picture	Name	Street Address	CH1903 X coordinate	CH1903 Y coordinate	Location
11627	Silbergasse House	Silbergasse House		690.063	204.213	46.982868°N 8.622457°E
11628	Tannen House	Tannen House		689.871	201.875	46.961866°N 8.619471°E
11629	Tannen (Sträbismattli) House	Tannen (Sträbismattli) House		689.944	201.854	46.961667°N 8.620426°E

== Muotathal ==
KGS No.^{?}	Picture	Name	Street Address	CH1903 X coordinate	CH1903 Y coordinate	Location
4833	Catholic Parish Church of St. Sigismund and Walpurga	Catholic Parish Church of St. Sigismund and Walpurga	Wil	700.540	203.770	46.97738°N 8.760048°E
Unknown		ISOS Dorf: Muotathal				

== Rothenthurm ==
KGS No.^{?}	Picture	Name	Street Address	CH1903 X coordinate	CH1903 Y coordinate	Location
9672	Medieval Letzinen, A Watchtower	Medieval Letzinen, A Watchtower		693.460	217.800	47.104599°N 8.669903°E
11652	Roter Turm und Tor (Red Tower and Gate)	Roter Turm und Tor (Red Tower and Gate)		693.932	217.970	47.106061°N 8.676155°E
Unknown		ISOS Weiler: Biberegg				

== Sattel ==
KGS No.^{?}	Picture	Name	Street Address	CH1903 X coordinate	CH1903 Y coordinate	Location
9674/extendedHtmlPopup 10210, 9674	Letziturm and Medieval Letzinen (Fortifications)	Letziturm and Medieval Letzinen (Fortifications)		690.800	216.290	47.091388°N 8.634562°E
4842	Battle of Morgarten Memorial and Chapel	Battle of Morgarten Memorial and Chapel	Ägeristrasse	690.727	216.151	47.090148°N 8.633572°E
Unknown		ISOS Weiler: Ecce Homo				

== Schübelbach ==
KGS No.^{?}	Picture	Name	Street Address	CH1903 X coordinate	CH1903 Y coordinate	Location
4848	Siebnen Powerplant	Siebnen Powerplant	Kraftwerk Wägital	710.790	225.550	47.171625°N 8.900066°E
Unknown		ISOS Verstädtertes Dorf: Siebnen (Galgenen				

== Schwyz ==
KGS No.^{?}	Picture	Name	Street Address	CH1903 X coordinate	CH1903 Y coordinate	Location
4850	Bundesbriefmuseum (Federal Charter Museum)	Bundesbriefmuseum (Federal Charter Museum)	Bahnhofstrasse 20	691.965	208.613	47.022181°N 8.648345°E
4858	Dominican Nuns Convent of St. Peter am Bach	Dominican Nuns Convent of St. Peter am Bach	Strehlgasse 18	692.584	208.374	47.019945°N 8.656437°E
9675	Village, Medieval / Early Modern Settlement	Village, Medieval / Early Modern Settlement		692.500	208.450	47.020641°N 8.655348°E
11689	Hermitage with Chapel, 14 Emergency Helpers and a Brothers' House	Hermitage with Chapel, 14 Emergency Helpers and a Brothers' House	Bergstrasse, Tschütschi, Rickenbach	693.750	208.380	47.019836°N 8.671773°E
11789	Forum der Schweizer Geschichte (Forum of Swiss History)	Forum der Schweizer Geschichte (Forum of Swiss History)	Hofmatt, Zeughausstrasse 5	692.213	208.521	47.021319°N 8.651588°E
4861	Ab Yberg im Grund House with St. Sebastian Chapel	Ab Yberg im Grund House with St. Sebastian Chapel	Grundstrasse 82	692.674	207.559	47.012603°N 8.657454°E
9750	Bethlehem House	Bethlehem House	Reichsstrasse 9	692.474	208.504	47.02113°N 8.655017°E
4862	Ceberg im Feldli House	Ceberg im Feldli House	Theodosiusweg 20	692.500	208.880	47.024508°N 8.655436°E
11630	House	House	Gotthardstrasse 99, Ibach	691.705	207.744	47.014401°N 8.64475°E
4860	Grosshus House	Grosshus House	Strehlgasse 12	692.488	208.383	47.02004°N 8.655176°E
11631	Immenfeld House	Immenfeld House		692.995	207.620	47.013106°N 8.661688°E
11632	House	House	Langfeldweg 14, Kaltbach	691.634	209.895	47.033757°N 8.644251°E
11633	House	House	Oberschönenbuch 79, Ibach	691.911	205.844	46.997284°N 8.647074°E
4879	Herrenhaus Waldegg	Herrenhaus Waldegg	Waldeggstrasse	693.030	207.839	47.015071°N 8.662193°E
4866	Hettlingerhäuser	Hettlingerhäuser	Rickenbachstrasse 31, 35	692.625	208.615	47.022107°N 8.657026°E
4852	Hofstatt Ital Reding	Hofstatt Ital Reding	Rickenbachstrasse 24	692.539	208.564	47.02166°N 8.655884°E
4853/extendedHtmlPopup 9749, 4853	Catholic Parish Church of St. Martin with Kerchel and Heiligkreuz Chapel	Catholic Parish Church of St. Martin with Kerchel and Heiligkreuz Chapel	Hauptplatz / Schulgasse	692.360	208.518	47.021272°N 8.653521°E
4873	Maihof	Maihof	Palais Nideröst, Schlagstrasse	691.751	209.265	47.028075°N 8.645662°E
4854	Palais Büeler (formerly Palais von Weber)	Palais Büeler (formerly Palais von Weber)	Herrengasse 42	691.992	208.748	47.023391°N 8.648727°E
4855	Rathaus (Town council house)	Rathaus (Town council house)	Hauptplatz 1	692.387	208.458	47.020728°N 8.653863°E
4876	Reding House	Reding House	Schmiedgasse 6	692.256	208.422	47.020423°N 8.652133°E
8802	State Archives of Schwyz	State Archives of Schwyz	Kollegiumstrasse 30	692.423	208.873	47.024456°N 8.654421°E
9757	House (Köplihaus)	House (Köplihaus)	Engiberg 4, 8	690.555	210.280	47.037368°N 8.630133°E
Unknown		ISOS Kleinstadt / Flecken: Schwyz				

== Steinen ==
KGS No.^{?}	Picture	Name	Street Address	CH1903 X coordinate	CH1903 Y coordinate	Location
4884	Beinhaus	Beinhaus	Dorfplatz	689.265	211.680	47.050135°N 8.613438°E
11765	Former Cistercian Nuns Convent in of the Au	Former Cistercian Nuns Convent in of the Au		688.650	210.570	47.040234°N 8.605128°E
11766	House	House	Herrengasse 11	689.161	211.572	47.049177°N 8.612048°E
11767	House	House	Herrengasse 15	689.150	211.579	47.049242°N 8.611905°E
11768	House	House	Räbengasse 17 (Feld)	689.172	211.139	47.045281°N 8.612108°E
Unknown		ISOS Dorf: Steinen				

== Tuggen ==
KGS No.^{?}	Picture	Name	Street Address	CH1903 X coordinate	CH1903 Y coordinate	Location
Unknown	Grinau Tower	Grinau Tower		716.005	230.634	47.216452°N 8.970149°E
Unknown		ISOS Spezialfall: Grinau				

== Wangen ==
KGS No.^{?}	Picture	Name	Street Address	CH1903 X coordinate	CH1903 Y coordinate	Location
Unknown		ISOS Verstädtertes Dorf: Siebnen (Galgenen				
