= Waldstätten =

Waldstätten may refer to:

- Waldstätte, a term for a "rural canton" in the Old Swiss Confederacy
- Canton of Waldstätten of the Helvetic Republic

== See also ==
- Federal Charter of 1291, uniting three cantons of Switzerland
