= Landsgemeinde =

Form of direct democracy in Switzerland

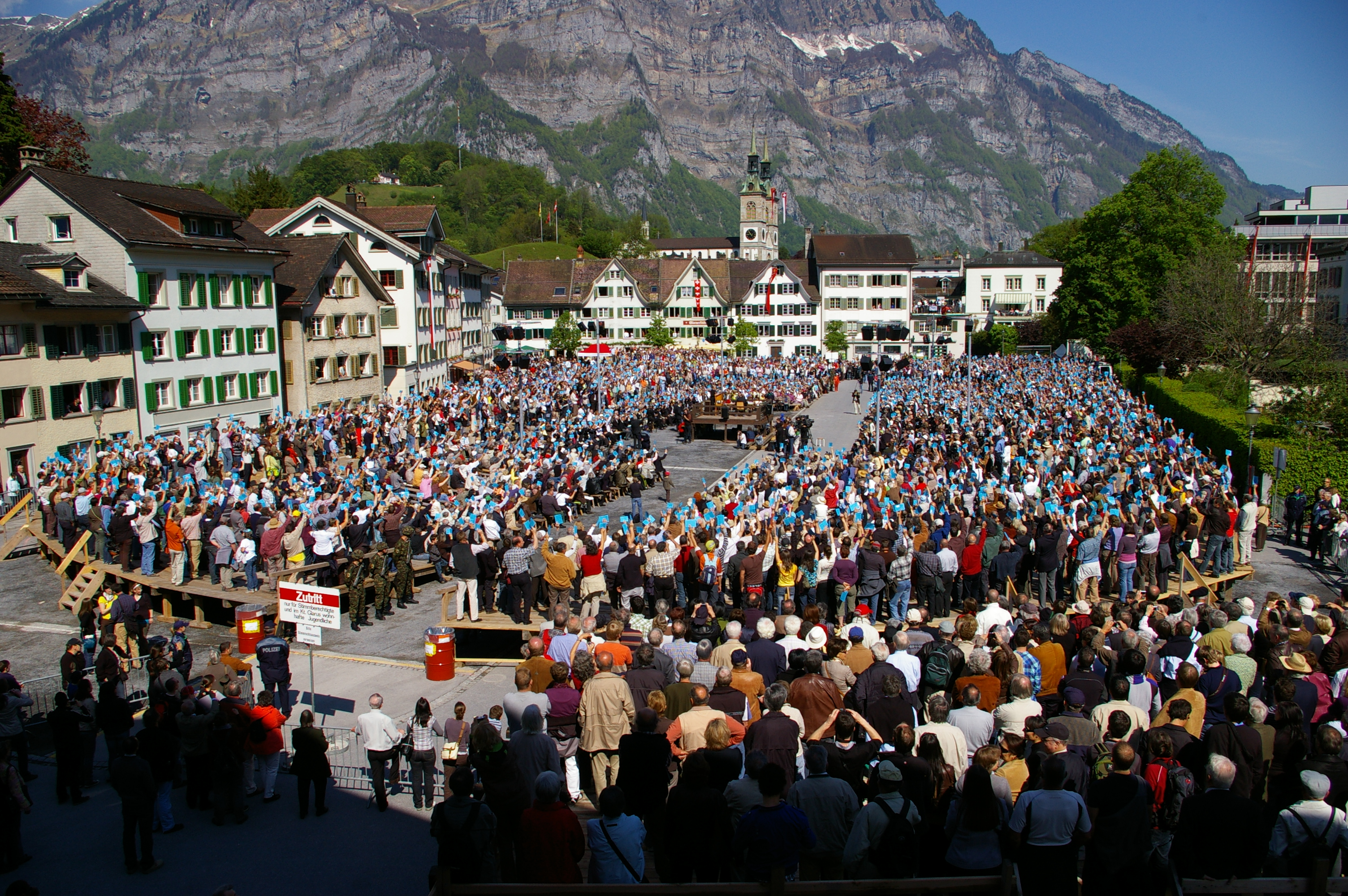
Landsgemeinde in Glarus, 2009

The Landsgemeinde ("cantonal assembly"; German: [ˈlantsɡəˌmaɪndə], plural Landsgemeinden) is a public, non-secret ballot voting system operating by majority rule. Still in use – in a few places – at the subnational political level in Switzerland, it was formerly practiced in eight cantons. For practical reasons, the Landsgemeinde has been abolished at the cantonal level in all but two cantons where it still holds the highest political authority: Appenzell Innerrhoden and Glarus. The Landsgemeinde is also convened in some districts of Appenzell Innerrhoden, Grisons and Schwyz to vote on local questions.

The German term Landsgemeinde itself is attested from at least the 16th century, in the 1561 dictionary of Pictorius. It is a compound from Land "land, canton; rural canton" and Gemeinde "community, commune".

Eligible citizens of the canton or district meet on a certain day in the open air to decide on specific issues. Voting is accomplished by raising one's hand in favor of a motion. Historically, the only proof of citizenship necessary for men to enter the voting area was to show their ceremonial sword or Swiss military sidearm (bayonet); this gave proof that they were a freeman allowed to bear arms and to vote. While voting cards have been introduced, in Appenzell presenting a sidearm is still a valid alternative to the voting card for men.

The Landsgemeinde has been the sovereign institution of the Swiss rural cantons since the late Middle Ages, while in the city-cantons such as Lucerne, Schaffhausen, or Bern, a general assembly of all citizens was never established.

Similar assemblies in dependent territories were known under terms such as Talgemeinde (for Talschaften, used in Ursern, Hasli, Obersimmental), Teding (Engelberg), Parlamento (Leventina), and Zendgemeinden (for the Zenden or districts of Valais), but also as Landsgemeinde in Toggenburg and in parts of Grisons.

== Definition ==
=== Structure ===
At the Landsgemeinde, citizens of a district or canton assemble annually in a public space under open sky to vote on a series of ballot questions. Depending on the canton, they raise their hand or voter identification card to either accept or reject the motion, which constitutes a non-secret ballot. Decision is taken by majority rule, and in case of incertitude, the Landammann estimates on which side the majority falls with the help of his colleagues from the communal council.

The duration of the Landsgemeinde varies significantly between the two cantons that still convene it. In Glarus, because of the high level of deliberation and possibility for citizens to propose an amendment of an existing law article or the introduction of a new one, the Landsgemeinde lasts between 2 and 4.5 hours on average. In Appenzell Innerrhoden on the other hand, deliberation is limited, thus the Landsgemeinden usually end after 1 to 2.5 hours.

=== Subject of the votes ===
Symptomatic of the federalist system of Switzerland, the Landsgemeinde differs in the scope of its usage from canton to canton. The legislative power is concerned both in Appenzell Innerrhoden and Glarus, where the Landsgemeinde can be used to implement laws or modify the cantonal constitution. In Appenzell Innerrhoden, the Landsgemeinde can also cover governmental issues, while in Glarus tax laws are regulated by Landsgemeinde decision and alternative legislative counterproposals ('constructive referendums') can be formulated by the citizens and voted on this occasion. In neither of the two cantons is the Landsgemeinde used to elect the parliament.

== History ==
=== Origin ===
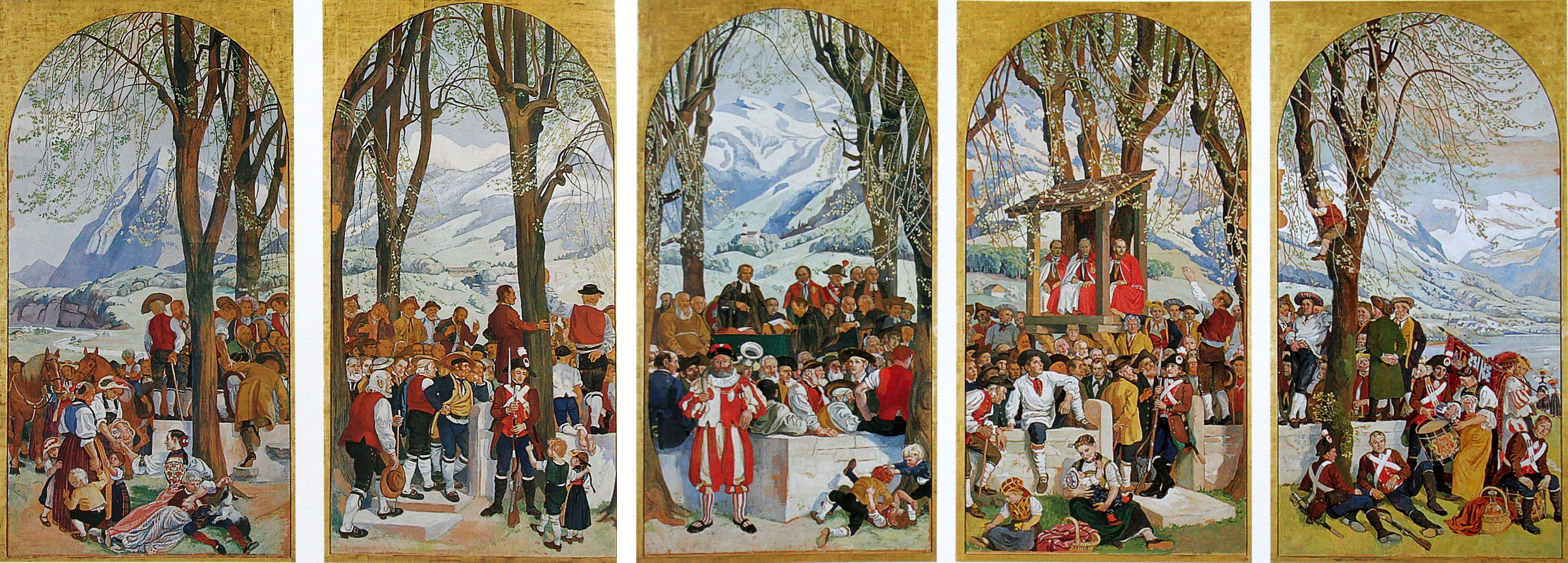
Die Landsgemeinde, fresco in the Federal Palace of Switzerland by Albert Welti and Wilhelm Balmer

The Landsgemeinde assembly is a tradition with continuity back to the later Middle Ages, first recorded in the context of the formation of the Old Swiss Confederacy. The tradition ultimately continues the Germanic thing, although not uninterruptedly, as the Alamanni had lost their independence to the Frankish Empire in the 8th century but re-emerging in territories with imperial immediacy since the 13th century.

The first Landsgemeinde proper is attested for Uri in 1231; however, these early assemblies grew seamlessly out of the older institution of blood courts (assemblies with the purpose of dispensing judgement on criminal offenses, see high justice). The Middle Latin texts when recording a Landsgemeinde usually express this by making universitas "the universality", or communitas hominum "the community of men" of a certain canton the subject of a sentence (see, for example, the Federal Charter of 1291), in order to emphasize that the decision was made by the community (direct democracy) rather than by a political elite.

In the Old Swiss Confederacy, the existence of a Landsgemeinde was the defining feature of the rural cantons (Länderorte, as opposed to the city-cantons). These Cantons were: Uri, Schwyz, Unterwalden (the forest-cantons), Glarus and Appenzell and Zug. Zug took an intermediate position, as it was a city-canton which due to the existence of a Landsgemeinde was also counted under the rural cantons.

With the formation of Switzerland as a federal state, the formerly sovereign cantonal assemblies became subject to federal law, and the Landsgemeinden came to be seen as anachronisms.

=== Evolution and current situation ===
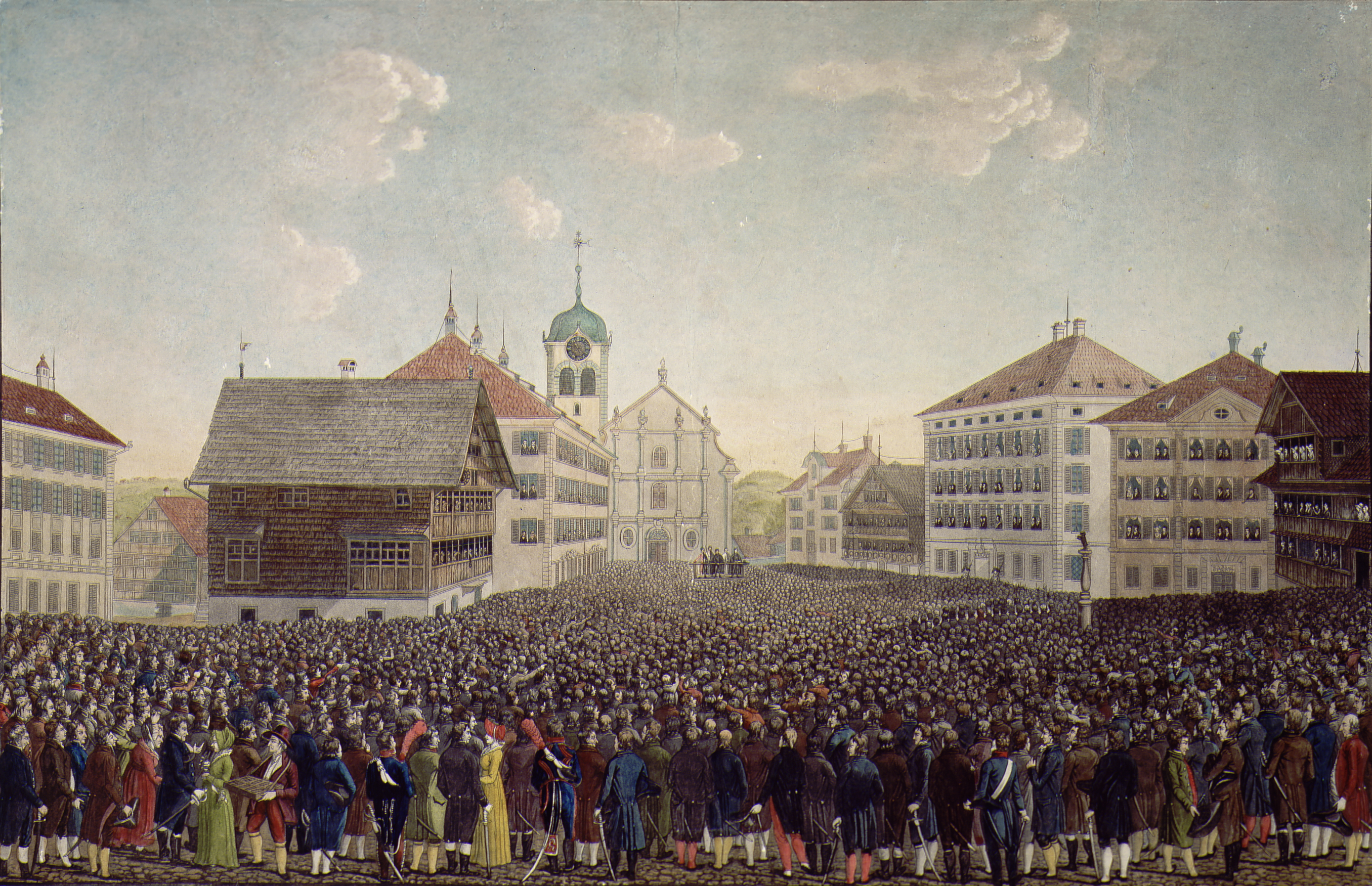
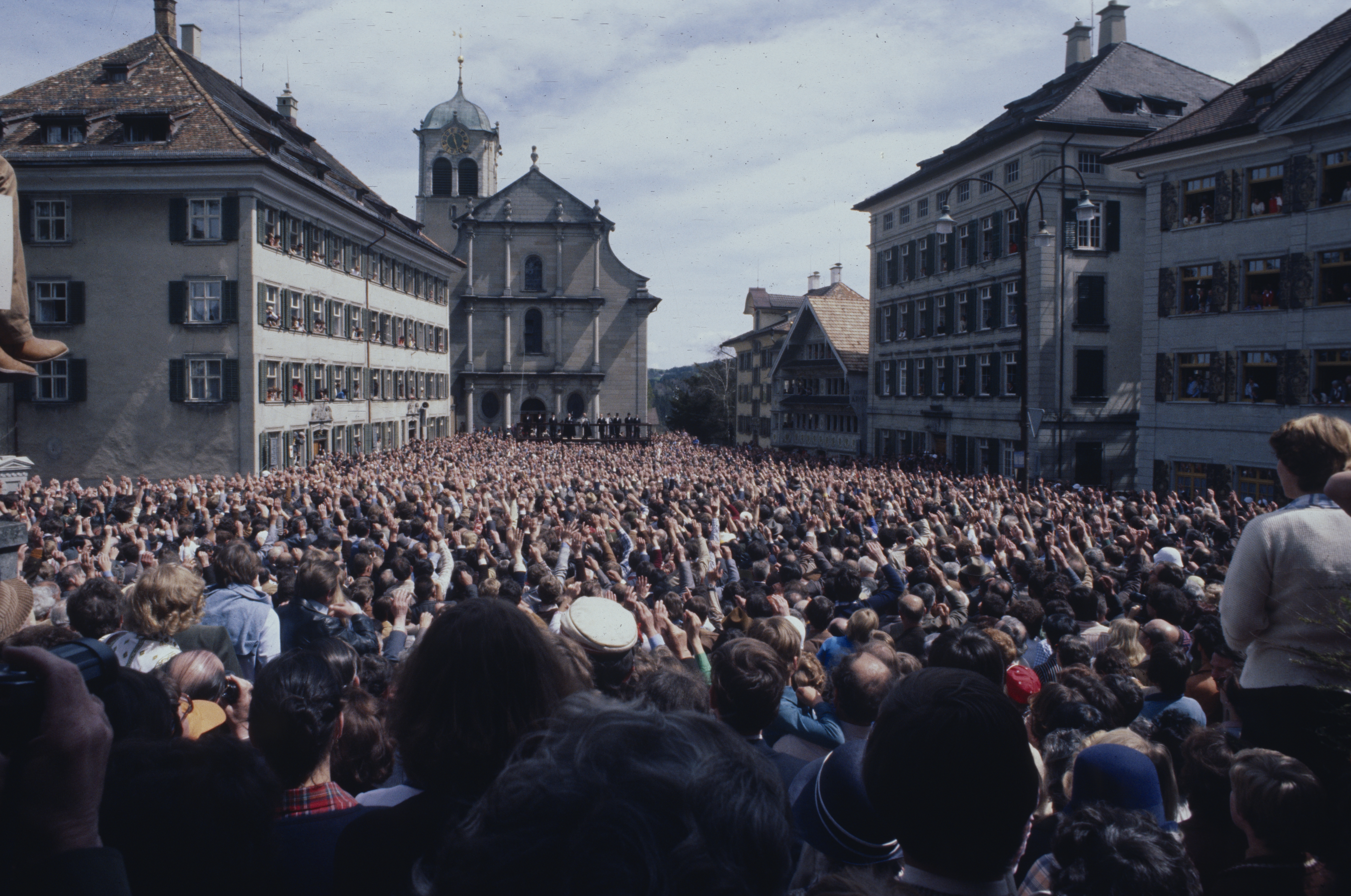
The 1814 and 1978 Landsgemeinden in Trogen, Appenzell Ausserrhoden

Silent movie of the Landsgemeinde in Altdorf, Uri in 1927

The usage of the Landsgemeinde was progressively abandoned at the cantonal level through the 19th and 20th century. Zug and Schwyz jettisoned it in 1848, followed by Uri in 1928.

Nidwalden in 1996, Appenzell Ausserrhoden in 1997 and Obwalden in 1998 abolished their cantonal Landsgemeinde by secret ballot votes.

Currently, Appenzell Innerrhoden, which rejected in 1991 by Landsgemeinde the abolition of this institution, and Glarus are the only remaining cantons to use this form of direct democracy. Beside the 1991 vote of Appenzell Innerrhoden, the usage of the Landsgemeinde has since then never been questioned in these two cantons, which suggests that citizens are attached to their institution. Moreover, turnout rates remained constant in the last 50 years both in Appenzell Innerrhoden and in Glarus. In the latter canton a participation record of 50% was even recorded in 2001.

Glarus recently introduced measures to encourage participation at the Landsgemeinde. In 2007, participation was extended to citizens aged 16 and older, which constitutes an exception in Switzerland. Likewise, each year on the day of the Landsgemeinde, participants can use all public transportation in the canton for free.

In Appenzell Innerrhoden and Glarus, the modernization of the institution, for example through the potential introduction of electronic vote-counting systems is debated, but no political party is opposed to the maintenance of the Landsgemeinden.

Besides the cantonal assemblies, the Swiss Confederation is supporting various projects inspired by the Landsgemeinden and built on the same ideas. For instance, the 4th Cyber-Landsgemeinde was organised on April 6, 2016 in Bern, with the aim to use democratic deliberation to foster reflections and find solutions related to the topic of cyber-security. Likewise, the urban municipality of Kloten implemented in 2012 a version of the Landsgemeinde to deliberate on the allocation of funds to local projects, which enabled for example the construction of a new Kindergarten.

== Related political paradigms and criticisms ==
=== Direct democracy ===
The Landsgemeinde forms one of the pillars of the direct democratic core of the Swiss political structure. Even if its use has sharply decreased in the past century, it is still considered as a characteristic institution of the Swiss democracy and is generally considered as a participative and inclusive democratic practice. However, while participation is according to the cantonal constitutions not only encouraged but also required as part of the civic duty of the concerned individuals, it is unclear if the Landsgemeinde offers better inclusivity and fosters a higher level of participation than the more traditional secret-ballot voting methods. Paul Lucardie (2014) notes for example that:

"Evidence suggests that attendance at assemblies in Appenzell and Glarus, as well as most town meetings in Vermont and possibly also in ancient Athens, has always been limited to roughly twenty per cent of the citizenry."

Moreover, the inclusion of women was until recently one of the main concerns for the inclusivity of the Landsgemeinde. Up to 1991, women were not allowed in the Landsgemeinde in the canton of Appenzell Innerrhoden, which was the last canton of Switzerland to grant women the right to vote, making it an exceptionally late introduction of women's suffrage for a European country.

Concerning the not accurate voting count, there is a tradition at the Landsgemeinde Glarus, that the Landammann will declare any unclear result as a vote against the government's proposal.

=== Ochlocracy ===
There have been suggestions placing the Landsgemeinde system in the vicinity of "ochlocracy" or "tyranny of the majority". Blum and Köhler (2006) suggested there might only be a "limited level of preliminary debate" possible leading to a failure to consider minority opinions.

The open ballot system ostensibly fails to assure the secrecy of the vote. Switzerland has explicitly introduced an exception to article 25 of its International Pact on Civil and Political Rights in order to protect the Landsgemeinde, avoiding complying with the letter of article 21.3 of the Universal Declaration of Human Rights protecting the secrecy of the vote. Switzerland has never ratified the first convention protocol of the European Convention on Human Rights for a similar reason.

Under such conditions, social control and other crowd manipulation processes might then prevent citizens from voting according to their own preferences and mislead rational decisions. On the other hand, according to the ancient Greek tradition of parrhesia, literally "saying everything", a public assembly could teach individuals to express their opinions with frankness and collective responsibility.

Studies of outcomes of the Landsgemeinde in various administrative divisions (Schaub 2012, Gerber & Mueller 2014) seem to suggest that proper preliminary deliberation can help reach better decisions defined by the "unforced force of the better argument" (Habermas, 1992).

== See also ==
- Voting in Switzerland
- Direct democracy
- Inclusive Democracy
- Participatory democracy

== Bibliography ==
- Marabello, Thomas Quinn (February 2023). "The Origins of Democracy in Switzerland," Swiss American Historical Society Review, Vol. 59: No. 1. Available at: https://scholarsarchive.byu.edu/sahs_review/vol59/iss1/4
- T. Favre-Bulle. (2015) The Urban Diffusion of Local Direct Democracy between Switzerland and the United States.
- H. Ryffel. (1903) Die schweizerische Landsgemeinde nach geltendem Rechte.
- W.-A. Liebeskind. (1971) L. et suffrage féminin, pp. 371–375.
- S. Duroy. (1987) «Les "Landsgemeinden suisses"», in Les procédés de la démocratie semi-directe dans l'administration locale en Suisse, pp. 1-94.
- Schaub, Hans-Peter. (2012) Maximising Direct Democracy – by Popular Assemblies or by Ballot Votes? Swiss Political Science Association.
- H.R. Stauffacher. (1989) Herrschaft und Landsgemeinde.
- P. Blickle. (1990) «Friede und Verfassung, Voraussetzungen und Folgen der Eidgenossenschaft von 1291», in Innerschweiz und frühe Eidgenossenschaft 1, pp. 15–202.
- U. Kälin. (1991) Die Urner Magistratenfamilien.
- L. Carlen. (1996) «Die Landsgemeinde», in Die Ursprünge der schweizerischen direkten Demokratie, ed. A. Auer, pp. 15–25 (with Bibl.).
- F. Brändle. (2005) Demokratie und Charisma.
- B. Adler. (2006) Die Entstehung der direkten Demokratie.
- B. Wickli. (2006) Politische Kultur und die "reine Demokratie".
