= Talschaft =

In Swiss politics, the body of voting population in a certain valley

In Swiss politics and the history of the Old Swiss Confederacy, a Talschaft is the body of voting population in a certain valley. The grouping of voters by valley rather than municipality is a tradition harking back to before the establishment of the current administrative divisions with the foundation of Switzerland as a federal state in 1848. A Talschaft will typically include voters of several municipalities. For example, the Talschaft of Lauterbrunnen Valley includes the voting population of the municipalities of Lauterbrunnen, Wengen, Mürren, Stechelberg, Gimmelwald and Isenfluh. Similarly, the Talschaft of Hasli consists of six municipalities, Gadmen, Guttannen, Hasliberg, Innertkirchen, Meiringen and Schattenhalb. In this case, the Talschaft is coterminous with the Bernese district of Oberhasli.

Historically, Leute der Talschaft is the traditional German translation of the Latin term homines vallis in the Federal Charter of 1291, literally 'the people of the valley'. Thus, the enumeration of the Confederates,

homines vallis Uranie universitasque vallis de Switz ac communitas hominum Intramontanorum Vallis Inferioris

is rendered as

"the people of the Talschaft Uri, the entirety of the valley of Schwyz and the community of people of the Talschaft of Unterwalden"

== See also ==
- Reichsvogt
- Waldstätte
- Landvogtei (Switzerland)
