= John of Winterthur =

John of Winterthur (c. 1300 – after 1348) was a Swiss historian who wrote a chronicle of history up to 1348.

== Background ==
Born in Winterthur, in what is now Canton Zurich, Switzerland, John attended school in his native village from 1309 to 1315 and then joined the Franciscans. As a member of the order, he lived at Baslein in 1328, at Villingen in 1336, and at Lindau from 1343 onwards.

His chronicle (Chronicon a Friderico II Imperatore ad annum 1348) began in 1340 and gives a history of events up to that year. His record of the later years consists more of notes or annals. Whether he updated his chronicle later is a matter of uncertainty.

== Assessment ==
The chronicle is a source of information on the first half of the fourteenth century, and gives an idea of the conflicts which arose between the cities and the nobles of Upper Swabia. It also provides a general view of events in the empire, especially of Louis the Bavarian's conduct toward the papacy and of the Franciscan Order's attitude toward the controversies.

John was a man of culture, well-versed in spiritual and in secular literature, but he frequently showed great credulity, and took delight in reporting the observations of others, which has made his work of such great value for medievalists.
