= Pact of Brunnen =

The Pact of Brunnen (Bund von Brunnen) is a historical treaty between the cantons of Uri, Schwyz, Unterwalden, concluded in Brunnen on 9 December 1315.

Representatives of the four territories (Unterwalden was composed of Obwalden and Nidwalden) met in Brunnen after the success of the Battle of Morgarten in the previous month to renew the promise of mutual military assistance. In 1318, Leopold I, Duke of Austria concluded a truce with the confederates. According to Aegidius Tschudi, the pact of Brunnen marks the decision to make what had been a pragmatic alliance a permanent, sworn confederacy, initiating the phase of growth of the Old Swiss Confederacy, with the accession to the pact by Lucerne in 1332 and Zürich in 1351, Glarus and Zug in 1352 and Bern in 1353.

While there are a number of earlier treaties of a similar nature, the treaty of Brunnen is particular because it was the first to be worded in German language rather than Latin. The treaty was long regarded as the foundational document of the Old Swiss Confederacy, until the Federal Charter of 1291 surpassed it in prominence during the first half of the 20th century.

== See also ==
- Communal movement in medieval Europe
- Historiography of Switzerland
- Rütlischwur
