= Gesslerburg Castle =

Ruins in Küssnacht, Schwyz, Switzerland

- Burg zu Küssnacht
- Küssnacht
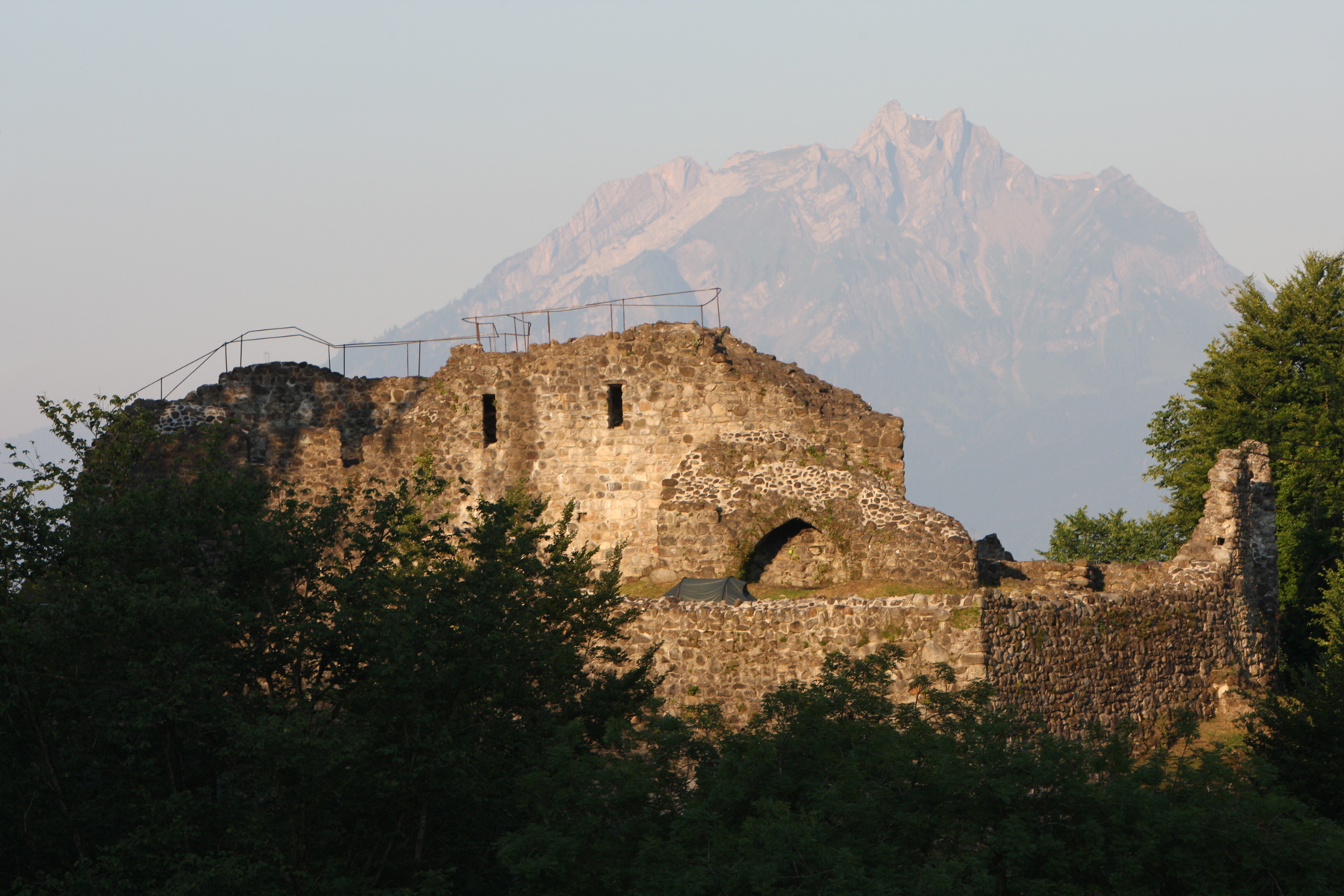
- The Gesslerburg with Mt. Pilatus in background

Site information
- Type: hill castle
- Code: CH-SZ
- Condition: ruin

Location
- Coordinates: 47°04′55″N 8°26′55″E

Site history
- Built: c. 9th century

Gesslerburg Castle is a castle in the municipality of Küssnacht of the Canton of Schwyz in Switzerland. It is a Swiss heritage site of national significance.

== See also ==
- List of castles in Switzerland
