= Pfäffikon Castle =

Castle in the canton of Schwyz in Switzerland

Pfäffikon Castle Complex
- Schlossturm Pfäffikon, Schloss Pfäffikon, Weissenburg
- Freienbach
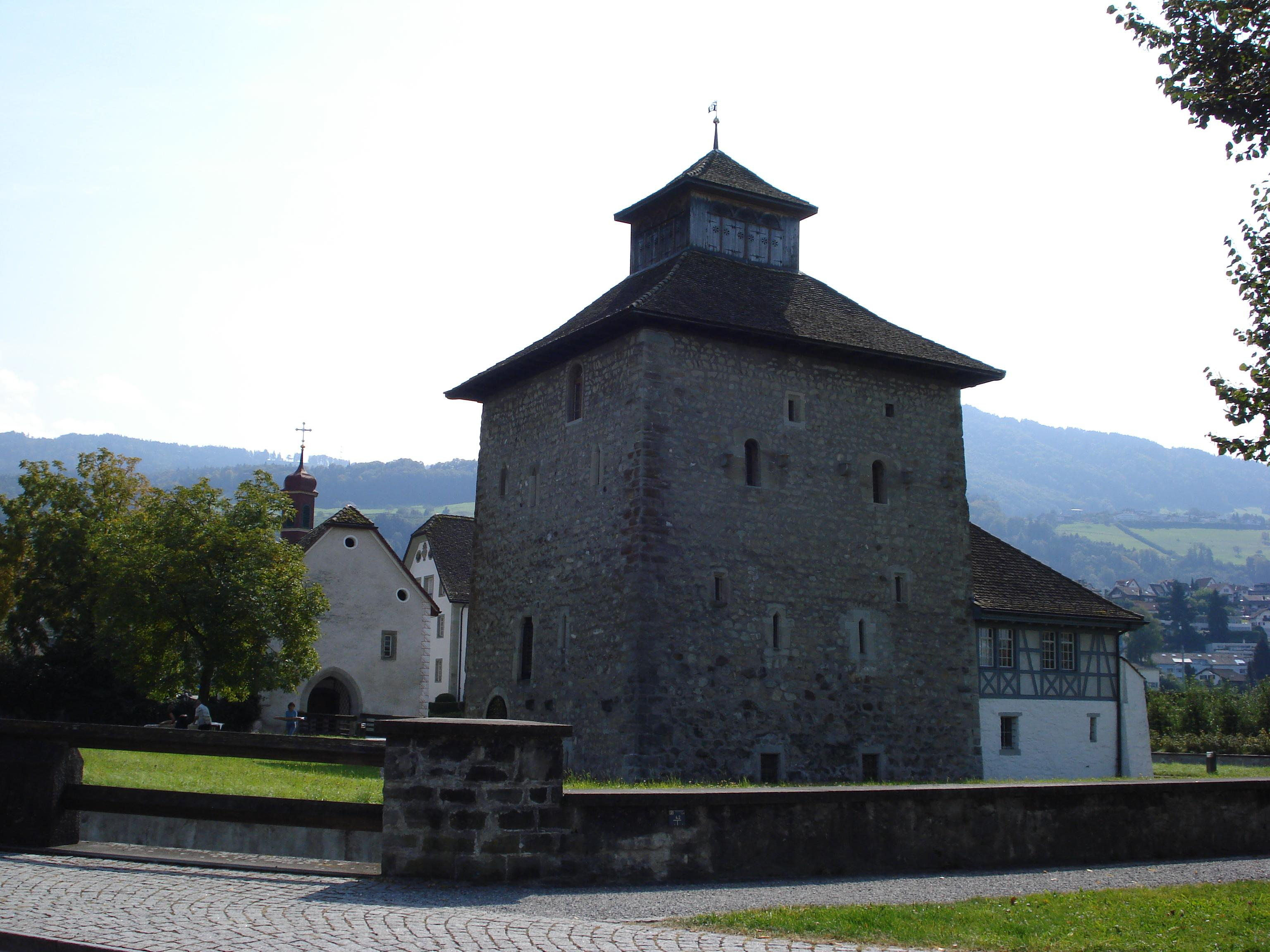
- Tower of Pfäffikon Castle

Site information
- Type: water castle
- Code: CH-SZ
- Condition: preserved

Location
- Location within Switzerland
- Coordinates: 47°12′17″N 8°46′29″E
- Height: 416 m above the sea

Site history
- Built: Mid 13th century

Garrison information
- Occupants: Clergy

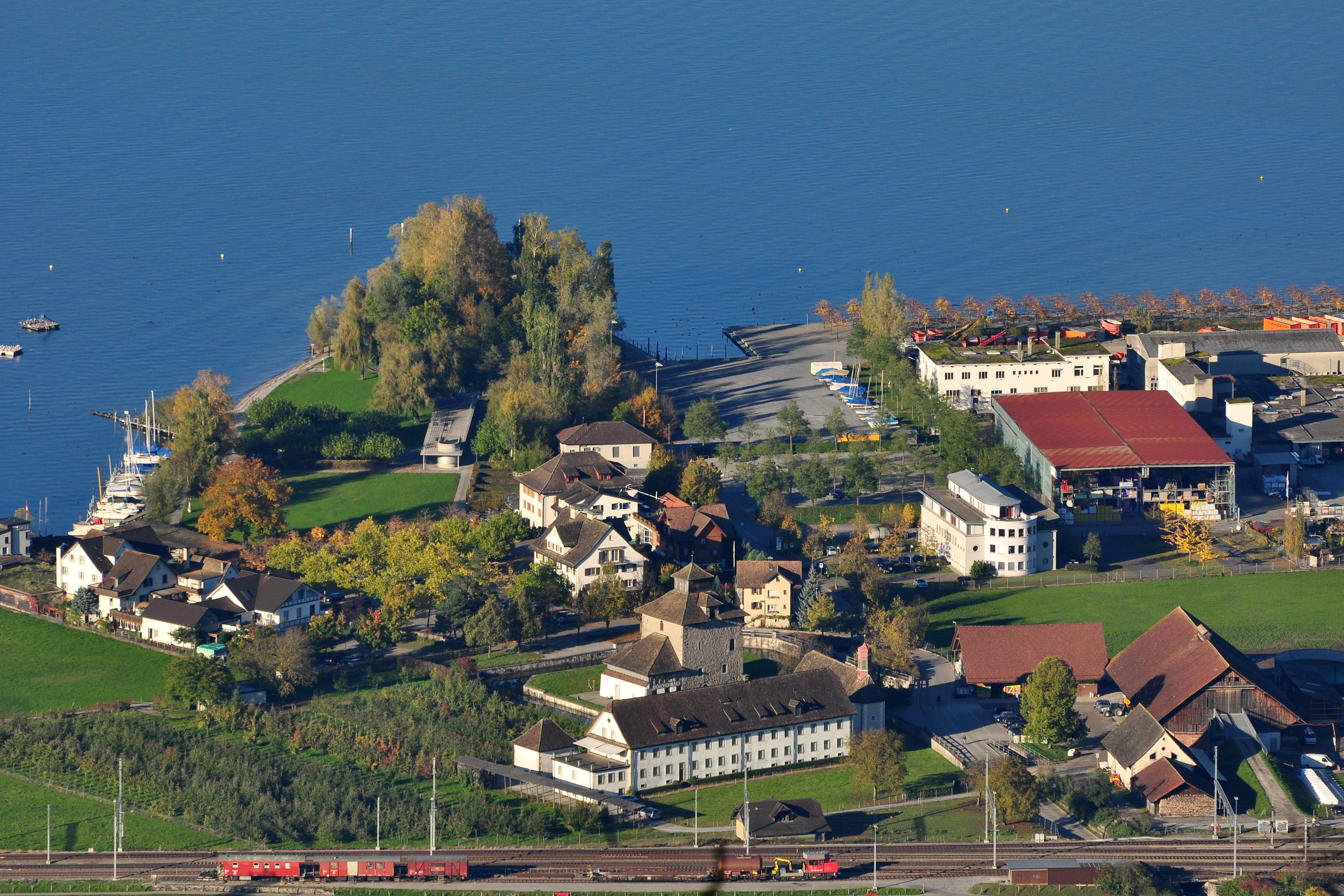
The castle (center) with surrounding buildings and Lake Zurich

Pfäffikon Castle is a castle in the municipality of Freienbach of the Canton of Schwyz in Switzerland. It is a Swiss heritage site of national significance.

== History ==
Einsiedeln Abbey was granted farms at Pfäffikon along with surrounding land along Lake Zurich by Emperor Otto I in 965. Soon thereafter the abbot built a large granary in Pfäffikon. Between 1233 and 1266 Abbot Anshelm von Schwanden replaced the old granary with stone tower which was designed as a watch tower, granary and residence. In 1299 the Prince-Abbot Johann von Schwanden added walls, ramparts and a moat to the tower during the Marchenstreit conflict between the Schwyz and the Abbey over grazing rights. On the night of Epiphany in 1314 a mob from Schwyz attacked the Abbey attempting to destroy the land and tax records. They hoped to destroy any records of the Abbey's counterclaims to the Schwyz grazing rights. However, the Abbot, perhaps anticipating the attack, had already moved himself and the important documents to Pfäffikon Castle.

By 1359 the castle was being used as the Abbot's summer residence as well as for its original purposes. In the 15th century Abbot Burkard von Weissenburg-Krenkingen (1418-1438) expanded the castle and changed its name to Weissenburg. He built a residential wing on one side of the tower and a chapel on the other. In 1480 the election of a new Abbot for the Abbey took place at Pfäffikon. In 1528 the castle was renovated and the walls and moat were repaired. Abbot Joachim Eichhorn (1544-1569) built a new Gothic chapel and expanded the granary in the castle. In 1577 a fire destroyed much of the Abbey and the village of Einsiedeln. The monks and villagers moved to the Castle for 7 months until the Abbey and their homes were repaired. Around 1760 Eichhorn's granary expansion was demolished and replaced with another residential wing. In 1785 the Gothic chapel was renovated in the Baroque style.

Following the 1798 French invasion and the creation of the Helvetic Republic Pfäffikon Castle was heavily damaged and declared the property of the Canton of Linth. Following the collapse of the Republic and the 1803 Act of Mediation the castle was returned to the Abbey and once again became religious property. In 1820 the remainder of the curtain wall was demolished while the tower, chapel and residential wings were rebuilt. In 1839 the rotten tower roof and overhand were replaced with the current roof. In 1928 the chapel was renovated and in 1986-88 the chapel, tower and moat were repaired and renovated. Today the castle and its restaurant are available for conferences, piano concerts, meetings and events, while the residential wings are used for municipal administration.

== Castle site ==
The main tower is a square 12.3 meters (40 ft) on each side and 13 m (43 ft) tall. The walls are made of massive stone blocks and are 2.3 m (7.5 ft) thick at the base, tapering to 1.4 m (4.6 ft) thick on the top floor. The main entrance is located on the west side of the first floor and was reached by a wooden staircase that could be pulled up if needed. The second story was built as a large living area and included large windows with built in seating that overlooked the lake. The third story was also probably used as living quarters. The tower was probably originally topped with a wooden structure that overhung the stone walls, before it was replaced with the current roof.

In the 15th century a two-story fortification was built near the tower and protected with a series of moats. In the 16th century, however, it was demolished and replaced with the current chapel. The moats were filled in and today only the main moat remains.

The chapel has a rectangular nave with a small polygonal choir. The portal is Gothic, while the interior was decorated in the Baroque style in 1780-85, which was partly replaced in 1893-95. The stucco is Neo-classical while the wall murals are from the late 19th century. The mahogany altars were built by Father Rudolf Blättler in 1892.

== See also ==
- List of castles in Switzerland
