= Canton of Waldstätten =

Canton of Waldstätten Kanton Waldstätten
- Canton of the Helvetic Republic
- 1798–1803
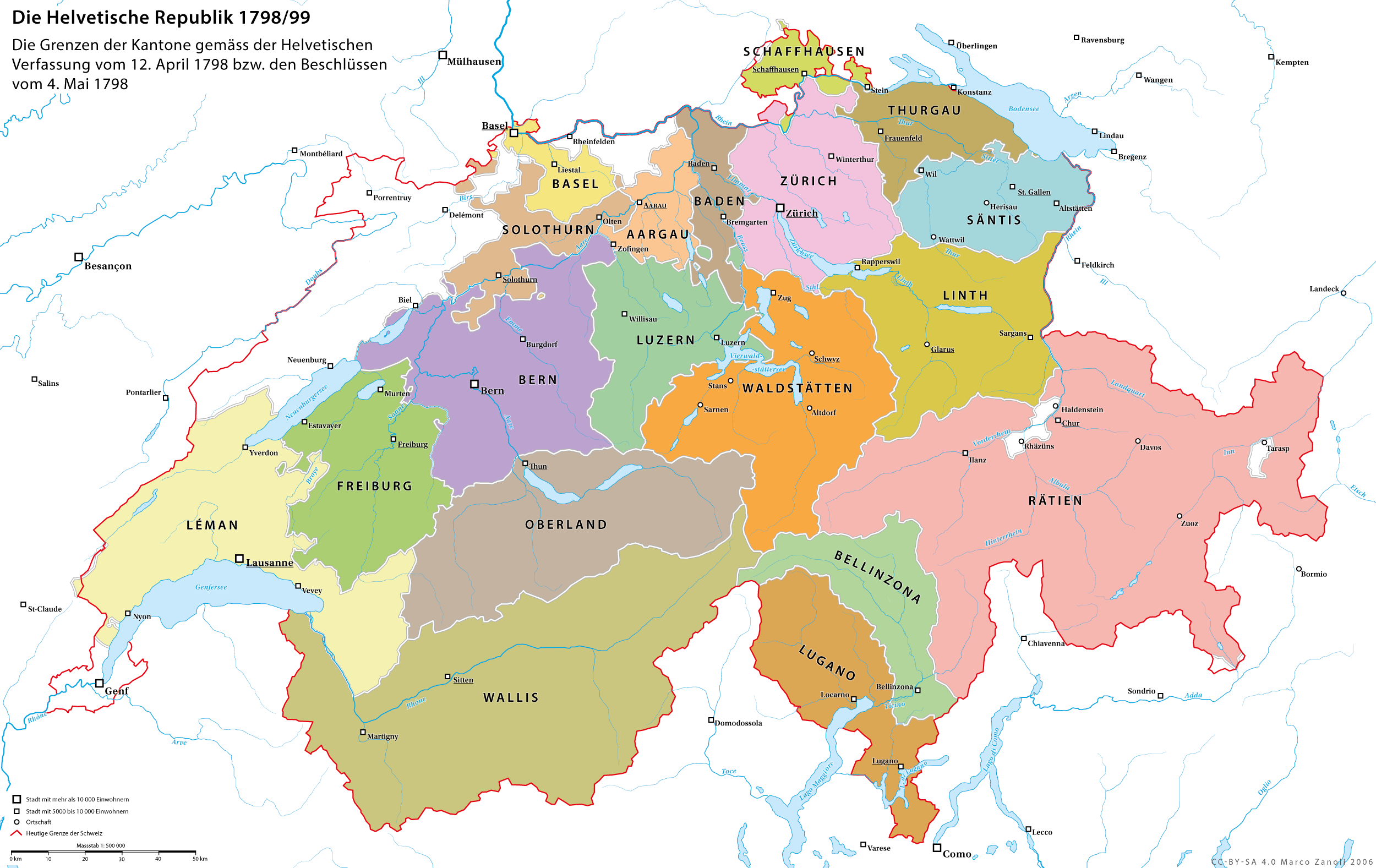
- The Helvetic Republic, as at the constitution of 12 April 1798, showing the canton of Waldstätten in orange, centre.
- Capital: Schwyz
- History
  - Helv. Rep. established: 1798
  - Helv. Rep. disestablished: 19 February 1803
Preceded by
Unterwalden	Unterwalden
Schwyz	Canton of Schwyz
Uri	Canton of Uri
Zug	Canton of Zug
Gersau	Republic of Gersau
Succeeded by
Unterwalden	Unterwalden
Canton of Schwyz	Schwyz
Canton of Uri	Uri
Canton of Zug	Zug

Waldstätten (German: Kanton Waldstätten) was a canton of the Helvetic Republic from 1798 to 1803, combining the territories of the founding cantons of the Old Swiss Confederacy, Uri (without the Leventina but with the Urseren), Schwyz (without March and Höfe) and both cantons of Unterwalden, which were collectively known as Waldstätten (German for forested settlements) since the 14th century, along with Zug, the Republic of Gersau, and Engelberg Abbey.

The rearrangement of the cantonal borders of the Helvetic Republic was not well received by the population of the inner forest cantons of Switzerland. The political influence of these cantons was also significantly reduced; instead of 16 seats in the Tagsatzung — for the cantons of Zug (with the Freie Ämter and Baden), Schwyz (without March but with Gersau), Unterwalden (Obwalden, Nidwalden and Engelberg) and Uri (without the Leventina but with the Urseren) — Waldstätten benefited from only four representatives.

Both the Malmaison Constitution and the Second Helvetic Constitution of 1802 proposed the repartition of Waldstätten, though this did not take effect until Napoleon's Act of Mediation in 1803.
