= Waldstätte =

Group of political units of the Old Swiss Confederacy

Waldstätte (German: [ˈvaltʃtɛtə], "forested sites/settlements;" Latin: civitates silvestres) is a term which has been used since the early thirteenth century to refer to the Stätte (singular: Statt, "site" "settlement"), or later Ort(schaft) (plural: Orte, "locality" "place" "lieu") or Stand (plural: Stände, "estate") of the early confederate allies of Uri, Schwyz and Unterwalden in today's Central Switzerland.

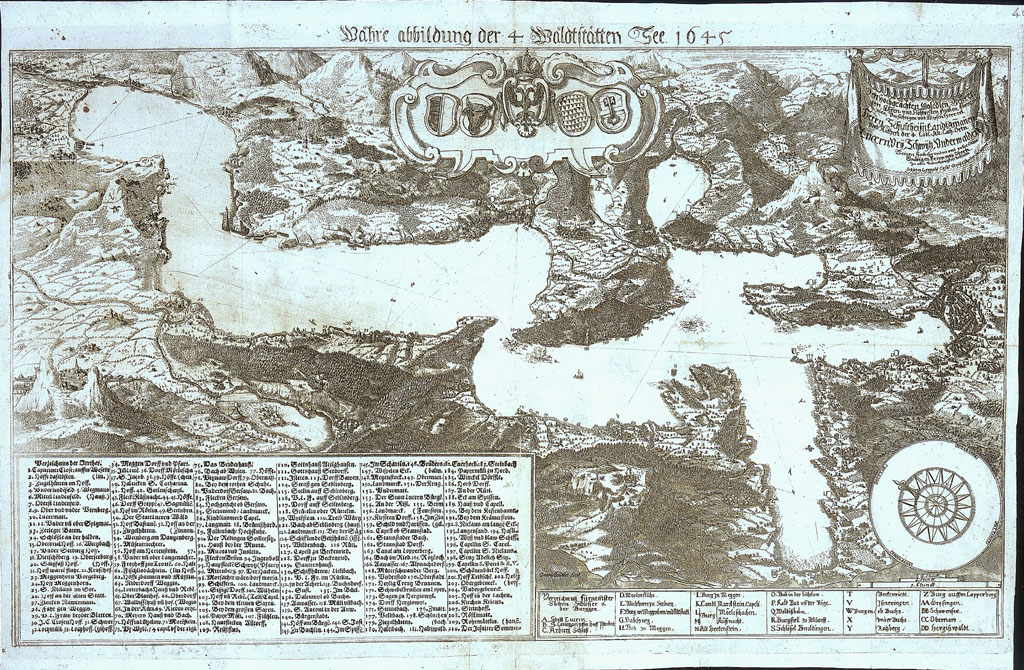
1645 map showing the Waldstätte: Uri, Schwyz, Unterwalden and Lucerne.

From the 13th to 19th centuries, the term Waldstätte also synoptically referred to the nucleus of the Swiss Confederacy of Uri, Schwyz and Unterwalden; later, the term was gradually replaced by the term Urschweiz.

The term Wald ("forest; woods") is to be understood in contrast to Forst, the former in Middle High German terminology referring to cultivated land of alternating pastures, fields and woods, while the latter referred to deep, uncultivated forests (silva invia et inculta).

== History ==
The Middle High German terms Waldstette or Stette (in the sense of "forested site/settlement") are also used alongside Stett (modern Stadt, or "town, city", in the sense of a powerful, possibly protected settlement with special rights) and Lender (modern Länder, in the sense of rural countrysides) in reference to the individual confederate allies into the first half of 15th century and became gradually replaced by the term Ort ("point; lieu") or Stand ("state"), which stayed prominent in German-speaking Switzerland until the Helvetic Republic; the term canton (in German: Kanton), in origin a Romance translation of German Ort, was unknown for the German-speaking allies until around 1650.

The first recorded use of the term specifically as referring to the wooded valleys of Central Switzerland is in a document dated 1289, mentioning ze Swiz in der waltstat (i.e. "in Schwyz, in the wooded site").

In 1323, Glarus was named a Waldstatt alongside Schwyz. The application to the allies of the early Swiss Confederacy dates to 1309. In 1310, Duke Frederick the Fair complains about the king impeding his rights to the civitatibus Silvanis.

With the establishment of the Confederacy in the 1310s, the term is adopted as an exonym, and in the pacts which expanded the Confederacy, with Lucerne in 1332 and with Berne in 1353.

The inclusion of Lucerne as a "fourth" Waldstätte is first mentioned in an addition dated to the 1450s in the Silver Book of Egloff Etterlin.

In the protocols of the Swiss Diet in the second half of the 15th century, under the presidency of Lucerne, the term vier waltstette sees frequent use. Albrecht von Bonstetten in his Superioris Germaniae Confoederationis descriptio (1479) suggests that the term vier Waldstett (Latinized quatuor Loca Silvarum) was in common use.

Lake Lucerne was given the new name of Vierwaldstättersee (aka Lake of Four Forested Sites) in the 16th century.

== See also ==
- Formation of the Old Swiss Confederacy
- Federal Charter of 1291
- Eidgenossenschaft
- Reichsvogt
- Talschaft
- Canton of Waldstätten
