= Unterwalden =

Historical canton of Switzerland

Coordinates: 46.87°N 8.31°E

Unterwalden Unterwalden
- c. 1300–1798; 1815–1999
- Flag Coat of arms

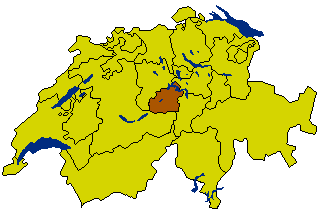
- Status: Canton of the Old Swiss Confederacy
- History
  - Established: c. 1300
  - Imperial immediacy: 1309
  - Pact of Brunnen: 1315
  - division of Obwalden and Nidwalden: before 1500
  - Disestablished modern canton: 1798; 1815–1999
Preceded by
Zürichgau (Swabia)
Aargau (Burgundy)
Canton of Waldstätten
Succeeded by
Canton of Waldstätten
Canton of Obwalden
Canton of Nidwalden

Unterwalden, translated from the Latin inter silvas ("between the forests"), is the old name of a forest-canton of the Old Swiss Confederacy in central Switzerland, south of Lake Lucerne, consisting of two valleys or Talschaften, now two separate Swiss cantons (or two half-cantons), Obwalden and Nidwalden.

The name Unterwalden is first recorded in 1304, as the translation of Latin inter silvas, which together with in intramontanis was the name for monastery possessions in the area. In 1291, Rudolf I of Germany purchased the estates at Stans, Alpnach and Giswil. From 1304, the local bailiffs used their own seal. In 1309, Henry VII confirmed the imperial immediacy of the territory of Unterwalden as part of the imperial bailiwick of Waldstätte (but not as a political entity in its own right). The Federal Charter, internally dated 1291, is thought to originate at this time. In the text, Unterwalden figures as communitas hominum Intramontanorum Vallis Inferioris "community of the men between the mountains of the Lower Valley"; this is usually rendered as "the community of the Lower Valley of Unterwalden" in modern translations, and interpreted as Nidwalden or "Unterwalden proper". Unterwalden was one of the three participants in the foundation of the Old Swiss Confederacy, named in the Pact of Brunnen of 1315 with Uri and Schwyz.

The division of Unterwalden into two separate territories, Obwalden and Nidwalden, in the early period is less than clear. Their status as two independent Talschaften appears to develop over the course of the 14th and 15th centuries, while they retain a single vote in the Confederacy.

The flag of Unterwalden in the 14th and 15th centuries was divided horizontally into equal parts red over white, identical with the flag of Solothurn. After the accession of Solothurn to the Confederacy in 1481, there were two cantons with identical flags, sometimes disambiguated by modifying the design of Solothurn's flag. By 1600, Nidwalden was known as Unterwalden proper or Subsylvania, while Obwalden was known as "Unterwalden ob dem Wald", strictly speaking an oxymoron, as it were Subsylvania super silva. From this time, there are also two separate coats of arms for the two half-cantons, the red-and-white flag for Unterwalden proper or Nidwalden, while Obwalden had a silver key in a red field.

By the 1640s, these two designs were re-combined in a white-and-red key on a red-and-white field (per fess gules and argent, a key paleways with double wards counterchanged) as the coat of arms of the united canton.

In Early Modern Switzerland, Unterwalden counted as a single state in "foreign relations" with the other member states of the Swiss Confederacy, but it consisted of two separate states internally, with separate governments, jurisdictions and separate flags.

Martin Zeiller in 1642 reports Unterwalden as divided in two separate Talschaften the inhabitants of which were derived from separate races, those of Obwalden from the "Romans", those in Nidwalden from the "Cimbri" (viz. Germans).

Unterwalden was restored in the Act of Mediation (1803) with a single constitution, but with two separate capitals, Sarnen and Stans, and two separate cantonal assemblies with equal sovereignty.

Unterwalden was a canton of the Restored Swiss Confederacy of 1815, and it was listed as a canton in the constitution of 1848, as Unterwalden (ob und nid dem Wald). The name of Unterwalden has been omitted in the 1999 constitution, with Obwalden und Nidwalden named as two separate cantons.

== Gallery ==
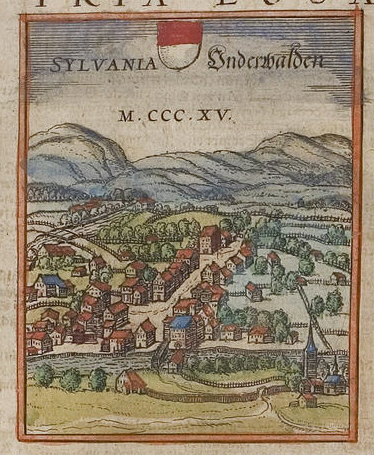
Unterwalden depicted as one of the thirteen cantons in 1572. Its name is Latinized as Sylvania, and its date of foundation is given as 1315, the date of the Pact of Brunnen, taken as the traditional founding date of the Swiss Confederacy until the 19th century. The old flag of Unterwalden is also shown, identical to the later Flag of Solothurn.

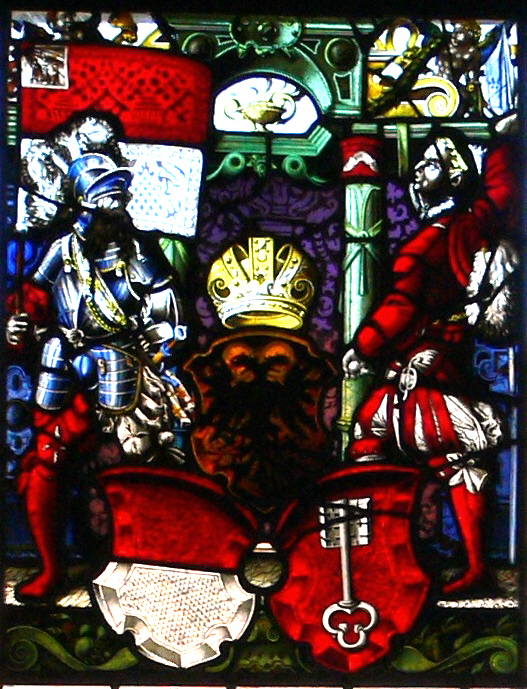
Standesscheibe of Unterwalden (16th century), showing the red-and-white design for Obwalden and the double-key design for Nidwalden.

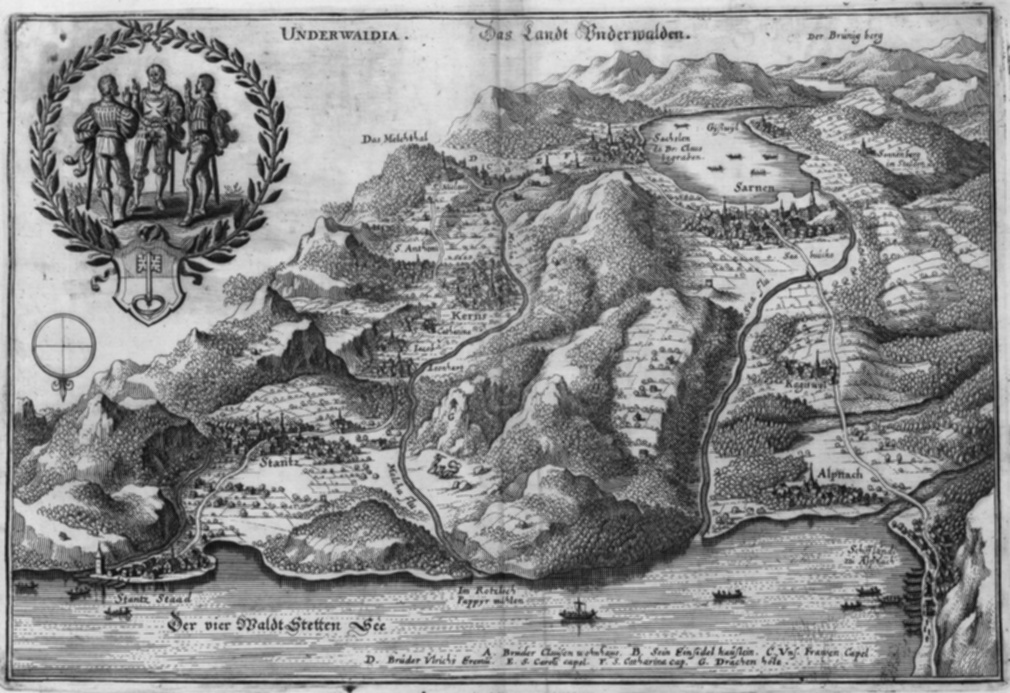
1642 map of Underwalden (Matthäus Merian)
