= Federal Charter of 1291 =

Constitutional document of Switzerland

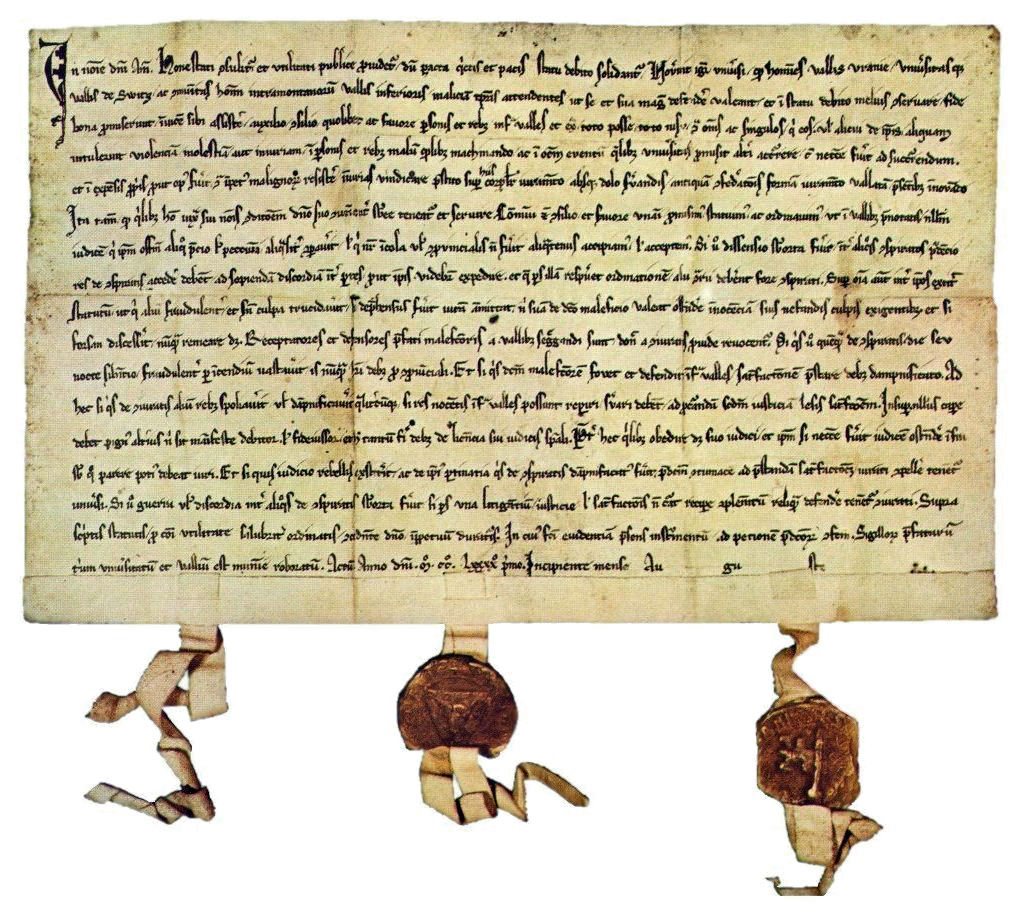
- Date effective: Early August 1291
- Purpose: Union of three cantons in what is now central Switzerland

Full text
- Federal Charter of 1291 at Wikisource

The Federal Charter or Letter of Alliance (German: Bundesbrief) is one of the earliest constitutional documents of Switzerland. A treaty of alliance from 1291 between the cantons of Uri, Schwyz and Unterwalden, the Charter is one of a series of alliances from which the Old Swiss Confederacy emerged. In the 19th and 20th century, after the establishment of the Swiss federal state, the Charter became the central founding document of Switzerland in the popular imagination.

The Charter documents the Eternal Alliance of the League of the Three Forest Cantons (German: Ewiger Bund der Drei Waldstätten), the union of three cantons in what is now central Switzerland. It is dated to early August 1291, which in the 20th century inspired the date of Swiss National Day, 1 August. Done in Latin, the Charter makes reference to a previous (lost or unwritten) pact. It is now exhibited at the Museum of the Swiss Charters of Confederation in Schwyz.

== Contents ==
The Alliance was concluded between the people of the alpine areas of Uri, Schwyz and Unterwalden (homines vallis Uranie universitasque vallis de Switz ac communitas hominum Intramontanorum Vallis Inferioris). The participants are referred to as conspirati and (synonymously) coniurati, traditionally translated in German as "Eidgenossen" (and in English as "Confederates").

The Charter was probably intended to ensure legal certainty after the death of Rudolf I of Habsburg on 15 July 1291. The first two paragraphs commit all three communities to the joint defence of the three valleys. The remainder of the Charter concerns judicial matters: It calls for arbitration in the case of conflicts, rejects foreign judges, establishes the death penalty for murderers and exile for arsonists, and commands obedience to judges and judicial verdicts.

== Date and context ==
The authenticity of the letter used to be disputed as a supposed modern forgery, but historians now agree that it is certainly a product of the 14th century. In 1991, the parchment was radiocarbon dated at ETH to between 1252 and 1312 (with a probability of 85%); alternatively, it could date to between 1352 and 1385 (with a probability of 15%).

The document is thus not a forgery, tied to the emergence of the modern federal state in 1848, but should rather be seen in the context of Chapter 15 of the Golden Bull of 1356 in which Charles IV outlawed any conjurationes, confederationes, and conspirationes, meaning in particular the city alliances (Städtebünde), but also other communal leagues that had sprung up through the communal movement in medieval Europe. It was then very common to produce documents only when needed. At the time, agreements were most often verbal, and any documentation drawn up later might have its contents or dates changed to suit current purposes.

The charter was part of a system of defensive pacts among the polities that later became the Swiss cantons. They include the following, also on display at the Museum of the Swiss Charters of Confederation:

- 1315: Federal Charter of Uri, Schwyz and Unterwalden 9 December 1315 (aka Pact of Brunnen)
- 1332: Charter of the City of Lucerne with Uri, Schwyz and Unterwalden
- 1352: Charter with Glarus
- 1352: Charter with Zug
- 1451: Contract with St. Gallen Abbey and Zürich, Lucerne and Schwyz and Glarus
- 1454: Eternal Contract for St. Gallen with Zürich, Bern, Lucerne and Schwyz, Zug and Glarus
- 1464: Contract of Rapperswil with the abovementioned
- 1481: Contract of Freiburg und Solothurn
- 1501: Contract with Basel of which the number of copies is known to be 11, corresponding to the 11 seals.
- 1501: Contract with Schaffhausen
- 1513: Contract with Appenzell

== Modern reception ==
The charter of 1291 became important in the historiography of Switzerland only in the late 19th century. Previously, the date of the foundation of the Confederacy had been traditionally given as 1307 (Aegidius Tschudi); this is the year inscribed for example on the Tell Monument, commissioned in 1895.

The idea of the charter of 1291 representing the founding document of the Confederacy was first suggested in a report by the Federal Department of Home Affairs of 21 November 1889, in the context of a proposed combined celebration of the 700th anniversary of the foundation of Bern and the 600th anniversary of the Confederacy in 1891. Celebration of a national holiday on 1 August based on the date on the document was first suggested in 1899 (although it was introduced officially only in 1994).

The idea to build a dedicated national monument housing the foundational documents of the Confederacy was first proposed in 1891 by federal councillors Emil Welti and Carl Schenk. This plan was revisited in 1915 during the preparation of the 600th anniversary celebration for the Battle of Morgarten, but its realisation was delayed due to World War I. After the war, the canton of Schwyz requested federal support for the project, which was granted in 1928. Designed by Joseph Beeler in 1933, the Bundesbriefarchiv (Federal Charter Archive) was opened in 1936. In 1979/80, the exhibition hall was renovated, and restoration work was carried out on the 21 banners and flags displayed in the museum. In 1998/99, the exhibition was re-arranged. In the meantime, the institution changed its name to Bundesbriefmuseum (Museum of the Swiss Charters of Confederation).

== See also ==
- Tagsatzung
- Rütlischwur
- Swiss National Day
- Historiography of Switzerland
- Cantons of Switzerland
