= List of cultural property of national significance in Switzerland: Uri =

This list contains all cultural property of national significance (class A) in the canton of Uri from the 2009 Swiss Inventory of Cultural Property of National and Regional Significance. It is sorted by municipality and contains 41 individual buildings, 3 collections and 2 archaeological finds.

The geographic coordinates provided are in the Swiss coordinate system as given in the Inventory.

== Altdorf ==
| KGS No.^{?} | Picture | Name | Street Address | CH1903 X coordinate | CH1903 Y coordinate | Location |
|---|---|---|---|---|---|---|
| 5772 | Ossuary Chapel of St. Anna | Ossuary Chapel of St. Anna | Kirchplatz 2 | 691.734 | 193.139 | 46.883038°N 8.642185°E |
| 8582 | Dätwyler-Stiftung | Dätwyler-Stiftung | Gotthardstrasse 31 | 692.097 | 192.566 | 46.877834°N 8.646831°E |
| 5786 | Federal Grain Silo | Federal Grain Silo | Eyschachen | 691.037 | 191.692 | 46.870119°N 8.632753°E |
| 9057 | Federal Magazine | Federal Magazine | Eyschachen | 691.010 | 191.775 | 46.870869°N 8.632415°E |
| 5775 | Fremdenspital with Chapel | Fremdenspital with Chapel | Gemeindehausplatz 2 | 691.677 | 193.134 | 46.883001°N 8.641436°E |
| 5789 | House im Eselmätteli | House im Eselmätteli | Herrengasse 1 | 691.576 | 193.094 | 46.882655°N 8.640103°E |
| 5776 | Jauch House or Suworow House | Jauch House or Suworow House | Hellgasse 9 | 692.062 | 192.877 | 46.880636°N 8.646435°E |
| 8579 | Historical Museum of Uri | Historical Museum of Uri | Gotthardstrasse 18 | 691.955 | 192.564 | 46.877835°N 8.644968°E |
| 5778 | Catholic Parish Church of St. Martin | Catholic Parish Church of St. Martin | Kirchplatz | 691.730 | 193.168 | 46.883299°N 8.642138°E |
| 8791 | State Archives of Uri | State Archives of Uri | Bahnhofstrasse 13 | 691.671 | 192.895 | 46.880852°N 8.641309°E |
| 5783 | Tell Monument and Türmli (Tower) | Tell Monument and Türmli (Tower) | Rathausplatz | 691.872 | 192.999 | 46.881759°N 8.643967°E |
| Unknown | | ISOS Stadt: Altdorf | | | | |

== Andermatt ==
| KGS No.^{?} | Picture | Name | Street Address | CH1903 X coordinate | CH1903 Y coordinate | Location |
|---|---|---|---|---|---|---|
| 5804 | Old and New Teufelsbrücke | Old and New Teufelsbrücke | Schöllenen | 688.165 | 166.885 | 46.64738°N 8.590311°E |
| 5807 | General-Suworow Monument | General-Suworow Monument | Schöllenen | 688.301 | 166.874 | 46.647263°N 8.592085°E |
| 9748 | House (Talmuseum) | House (Talmuseum) | Gotthardstrasse 113 | 688.564 | 165.263 | 46.632738°N 8.59521°E |
| Unknown | | ISOS Dorf: Andermatt | | | | |

== Attinghausen ==
| KGS No.^{?} | Picture | Name | Street Address | CH1903 X coordinate | CH1903 Y coordinate | Location |
|---|---|---|---|---|---|---|
| 5813 | Ruins of Attinghausen Castle | Ruins of Attinghausen Castle | Schulhausweg | 690.824 | 190.806 | 46.862179°N 8.629783°E |
| 5814 | Schweinsberg House | Schweinsberg House | Schweinsberggasse 6 | 690.551 | 191.025 | 46.864186°N 8.626247°E |

== Bauen ==
| KGS No.^{?} | Picture | Name | Street Address | CH1903 X coordinate | CH1903 Y coordinate | Location |
|---|---|---|---|---|---|---|
| Unknown | | ISOS Dorf: Bauen | | | | |

== Bürglen ==
| KGS No.^{?} | Picture | Name | Street Address | CH1903 X coordinate | CH1903 Y coordinate | Location |
|---|---|---|---|---|---|---|
| 5821 | In Der Spielmatt «Planzerhaus» House | In Der Spielmatt «Planzerhaus» House | Klausenstrasse 144 | 693.397 | 192.319 | 46.875431°N 8.663832°E |
| 5822 | Catholic Parish Church of St. Peter and Paul with Ossuary and Ölberg Chapel | Catholic Parish Church of St. Peter and Paul with Ossuary and Ölberg Chapel | Kirchplatz | 693.293 | 192.283 | 46.875122°N 8.662461°E |
| Unknown | | ISOS Dorf: Bürglen (UR) | | | | |

== Erstfeld ==
| KGS No.^{?} | Picture | Name | Street Address | CH1903 X coordinate | CH1903 Y coordinate | Location |
|---|---|---|---|---|---|---|
| 10309 | | Stallscheune | Hinterwiler, Wilerstrasse | 693.213 | 184.020 | 46.800813°N 8.659725°E |
| 5830 | | Pilgrimage Chapel of Jagdmatt | Kapellweg | 692.267 | 185.869 | 46.817576°N 8.647707°E |
| 10310 | | House | Talweg 14 | 691.929 | 186.110 | 46.81979°N 8.643327°E |
| Unknown | | ISOS Verstädtertes Dorf: Erstfeld | | | | |

== Flüelen ==
| KGS No.^{?} | Picture | Name | Street Address | CH1903 X coordinate | CH1903 Y coordinate | Location |
|---|---|---|---|---|---|---|
| 9063 | Flüelen railway station (SBB) | Flüelen railway station (SBB) | Bahnhofstrasse 1 | 690.335 | 195.187 | 46.901649°N 8.624239°E |
| 5834 | Ziegelhütte | Ziegelhütte | Seemattstrasse 4 | 690.221 | 195.149 | 46.901323°N 8.622735°E |
| Unknown | | ISOS Verstädtertes Dorf: Flüelen | | | | |

== Göschenen ==
| KGS No.^{?} | Picture | Name | Street Address | CH1903 X coordinate | CH1903 Y coordinate | Location |
|---|---|---|---|---|---|---|
| Unknown | | ISOS Verstädtertes Dorf: Göschenen | | | | |

== Gurtnellen ==
| KGS No.^{?} | Picture | Name | Street Address | CH1903 X coordinate | CH1903 Y coordinate | Location |
|---|---|---|---|---|---|---|
| Unknown | | ISOS Spezialfall: Gurtnellen-Wiler | | | | |

== Hospental ==
| KGS No.^{?} | Picture | Name | Street Address | CH1903 X coordinate | CH1903 Y coordinate | Location |
|---|---|---|---|---|---|---|
| 10245 | Galgen | Galgen | | 687.120 | 164.165 | 46.623052°N 8.576148°E |
| 5844 | Langobarden Tower | Langobarden Tower | Turmmatte | 686.410 | 163.670 | 46.618691°N 8.566786°E |
| 10246 | | Ökonomiegebäude / Stallscheune | Steg | 687.185 | 164.360 | 46.624797°N 8.577033°E |
| Unknown | | ISOS Dorf: Hospental | | | | |

== Isenthal ==
| KGS No.^{?} | Picture | Name | Street Address | CH1903 X coordinate | CH1903 Y coordinate | Location |
|---|---|---|---|---|---|---|
| 10247 | House | House | Ringli | 686.160 | 196.159 | 46.910946°N 8.569636°E |

== Schattdorf ==
| KGS No.^{?} | Picture | Name | Street Address | CH1903 X coordinate | CH1903 Y coordinate | Location |
|---|---|---|---|---|---|---|
| 10248 | | Dance Hall | Kirchgasse | 692.790 | 191.075 | 46.864327°N 8.655618°E |

== Seedorf ==
| KGS No.^{?} | Picture | Name | Street Address | CH1903 X coordinate | CH1903 Y coordinate | Location |
|---|---|---|---|---|---|---|
| 5856 | Benedictine Nuns Convent of St. Lazarus | Benedictine Nuns Convent of St. Lazarus | Klosterweg 4 | 689.533 | 193.030 | 46.882357°N 8.613291°E |
| 5858 | Apro Castle | Apro Castle | A Pro-Strasse | 688.998 | 193.490 | 46.886566°N 8.606363°E |

== Seelisberg ==
| KGS No.^{?} | Picture | Name | Street Address | CH1903 X coordinate | CH1903 Y coordinate | Location |
|---|---|---|---|---|---|---|
| 5860 | Rütlihaus Auf Der Rütliwiese | Rütlihaus Auf Der Rütliwiese | Rütli | 687.801 | 202.576 | 46.968448°N 8.592412°E |
| 9746 | Schillerstein | Schillerstein | | 688.106 | 204.190 | 46.982924°N 8.596732°E |
| 5859 | Wirtshaus zur Treib | Wirtshaus zur Treib | Treib | 687.291 | 204.653 | 46.987196°N 8.58611°E |
| 10249 | House at Buochholz | House at Buochholz | Ziegelmätteli 2 | 686.361 | 203.888 | 46.980437°N 8.573741°E |

== Silenen ==
| KGS No.^{?} | Picture | Name | Street Address | CH1903 X coordinate | CH1903 Y coordinate | Location |
|---|---|---|---|---|---|---|
| 10250 | Farm House | Farm House | Kirchstrasse 49 | 694.235 | 183.088 | 46.792287°N 8.672919°E |
| 10312 | Former Sust with Hotel | Former Sust with Hotel | Dörfli 15 | 694.231 | 181.582 | 46.778742°N 8.672556°E |
| 5869 | Iron Smelting Furnace | Iron Smelting Furnace | | 697.352 | 180.287 | 46.766646°N 8.713142°E |
| 5868 | SBB Powerplant | SBB Powerplant | Gotthardstrasse 115 | 694.123 | 180.345 | 46.767631°N 8.670888°E |
| 10449 | Meier Tower | Meier Tower | Sustenweg | 694.206 | 181.629 | 46.779168°N 8.672238°E |
| 10313 | House at Dörfli 1 | House at Dörfli 1 | Burghofstatt | 694.183 | 181.670 | 46.77954°N 8.671946°E |
| 5867 | Zwing Uri Castle Prehistoric and Medieval settlement / Castle | Zwing Uri Castle; Prehistoric and Medieval settlement / Castle | | 694.080 | 181.088 | 46.77432°N 8.670477°E |
| Unknown | | ISOS Hamlet: Dörfli | | 694.174 | 181.626 | 46.779146°N 8.671819°E |
| Unknown | | ISOS Significant Site: Amsteg | | 694.074 | 180.727 | 46.771074°N 8.670325°E |
| Unknown | ISOS Significant Site: Berghotel Maderanertal | ISOS Significant Site: Berghotel Maderanertal | | 701.831 | 182.063 | 46.78195°N 8.772164°E |

== Sisikon ==
| KGS No.^{?} | Picture | Name | Street Address | CH1903 X coordinate | CH1903 Y coordinate | Location |
|---|---|---|---|---|---|---|
| 5873 | Tell Chapel Bei Der Tellsplatte | Tell Chapel Bei Der Tellsplatte | | 689.340 | 198.617 | 46.932634°N 8.611855°E |

== Spiringen ==
| KGS No.^{?} | Picture | Name | Street Address | CH1903 X coordinate | CH1903 Y coordinate | Location |
|---|---|---|---|---|---|---|
| 10314 | | House | Oberdorf | 699.014 | 192.006 | 46.871803°N 8.737436°E |

== Unterschächen ==
| KGS No.^{?} | Picture | Name | Street Address | CH1903 X coordinate | CH1903 Y coordinate | Location |
|---|---|---|---|---|---|---|
| 5878 | | Sawmill | Bielen | 701.609 | 190.562 | 46.858425°N 8.771147°E |

== Wassen ==
| KGS No.^{?} | Picture | Name | Street Address | CH1903 X coordinate | CH1903 Y coordinate | Location |
|---|---|---|---|---|---|---|
| 5883 | Catholic Parish Church of St. Gallus | Catholic Parish Church of St. Gallus | Kirchgasse | 688.890 | 173.530 | 46.707052°N 8.601066°E |
