= Standseilbahn Amsteg–Bristen =

Funicular at hydro-power plant in Uri, Switzerland

Coordinates: 46.76552°N 8.67152°E

Standseilbahn Amsteg-Bristen
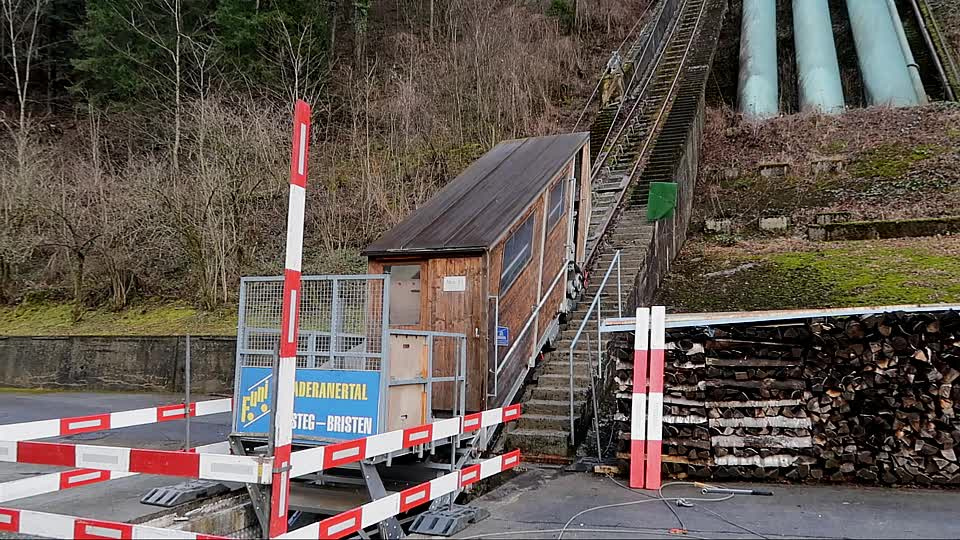
- lower station (March 2017)

Overview
- Other names: Standseilbahn Kraftwerk Amsteg SBB; Funi Maderanertal
- Owner: Swiss Federal Railways
- Locale: Canton of Uri, Switzerland
- Termini: Amsteg; Bristen
- Stations: 2

Service
- Type: funicular
- Rolling stock: 1 for 20 passengers

History
- Opened: 1920 (106 years ago)
- Opened to public: 2003 (during road closure)
- Opened to public: 2017 (during road closure)

Technical
- Line length: 400 m (1,300 ft)
- Number of tracks: 1
- Electrification: from opening
- Maximum incline: 92%

Standseilbahn Amsteg–Bristen (also Standseilbahn Kraftwerk Amsteg SBB) was built 1920 for the construction of the Amsteg power plant between Amsteg at ca. 530 m and Bristen at ca. 780 m in the Canton of Uri, Switzerland. The funicular line with a single car has a length of 400 m and a maximum incline of 92%.

In 2017, when Bristenstrasse, the only road from Amsteg to Bristen and Maderanertal, had been destroyed and had to be repaired, the funicular was revised, inspected and temporarily authorized for public transport within a week.

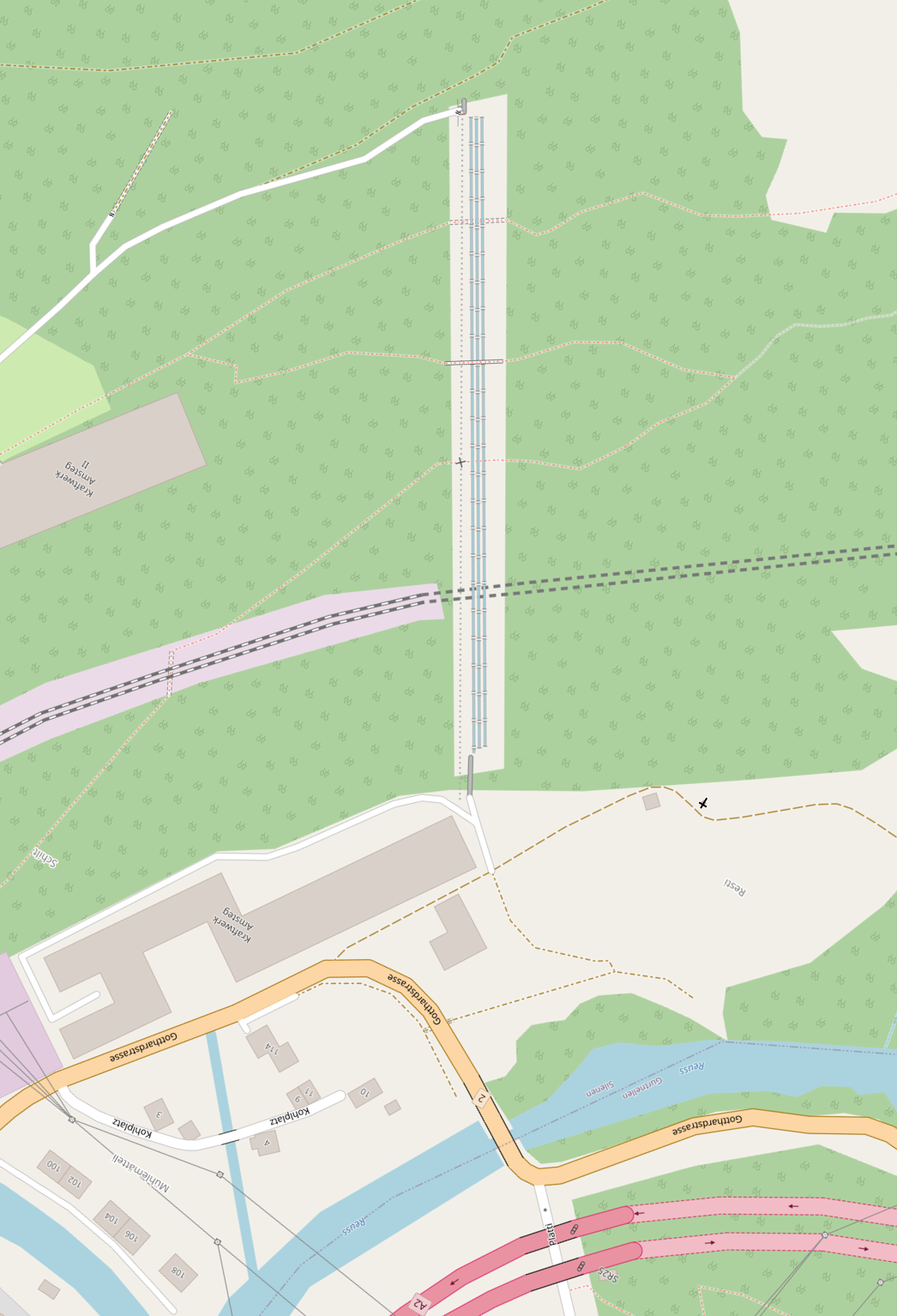
location in Amsteg

construction of the plant

Amsteg power plant with funicular and pipelines on the right (1923)
