= Berghotel Maderanertal =

Historic hotel in Switzerland

Coordinates: 46°46′55″N 8°46′20″E

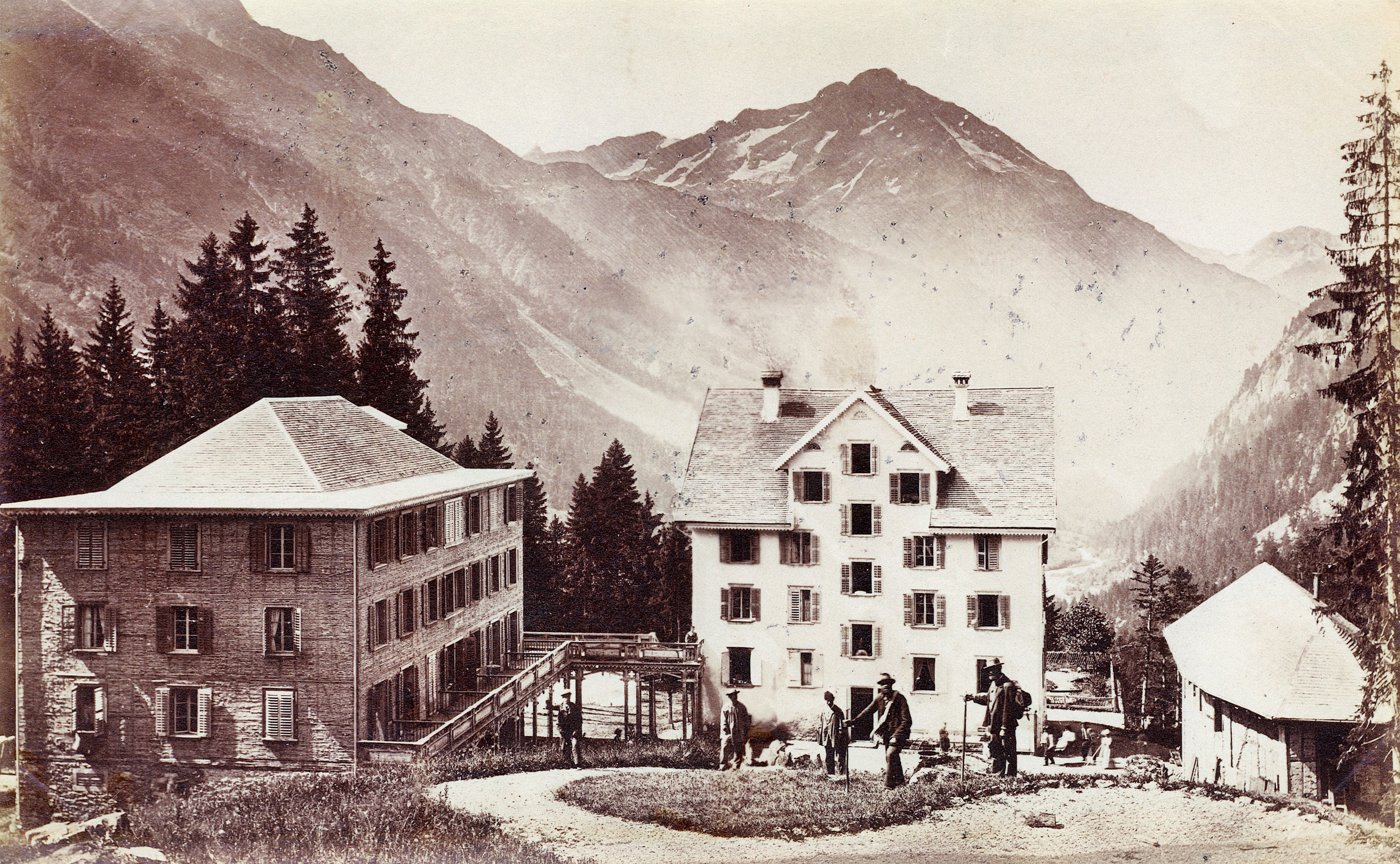
Hotel Maderanertal in the Maderanertal Valley, Switzerland, originally established in 1864 as "Zum Schweizerischen Alpenclub"

The Berghotel Maderanertal (since 1992 Hotel Maderanertal) is a historic mountain hotel in Silenen, Switzerland, from the "golden years of alpinism". The hotel was built in 1864 under the name Zum Schweizerischen Alpenclub ("At the Swiss Alpine Club") by Albin Indergand, hotelier and government councillor from Amsteg. The original name was suggested by co-founders of the Schweizer Alpen-Club (SAC), which was founded the previous year.

The hotel has 65 beds in nostalgic rooms, a restaurant and a garden terrace that holds 70 people as well as a hall for up to 75 people.

The ensemble of the Berghotel Maderanertal is an important witness to the history of tourism and as a site of national importance in the Inventar der schützenswerten Ortsbilder der Schweiz (ISOS).

== Location ==
The hotel is located on the Balmenegg rock plateau (1349 meters above sea level) at the back of the Maderanertal in the Glarus Alps in the Silenen municipality in the Swiss canton of Uri.

The local hiking trail 590 - Höhenweg Maderanertal - leads past it.

== History ==
Because of the growing number of mountain tourists from England and Switzerland, the Dépendance was built in 1869 to meet the demands. This was followed by another new building and the villa. The hotel complex on Balmenegg expanded more and more over the years, a bakery, bowling alley and post office were added. A small church was built on the hill above the buildings in 1888, where Catholic and Anglican services were held.

The building complex began to resemble a small village with its infrastructure additions. The hotel had artistically wallpapered rooms, as well as a dining and dance hall with large mirrors, a library, a reading room, a tourist lounge, a hair salon, and even a doctor's surgery. In a well maintained garden area there was a small lake with a row boat. Sometimes the mountain hotel even issued its own postage stamp.

After the first world war, electric lights were installed and pipes were laid for cold and hot water. The hotel was now run as a spa hotel, offering luxury and convenience to guests in the mountains.

Up until the 1950s, the house employed more than two dozen people from the surrounding area. As early as the 19th century, most of the guests stayed at the hotel for more than a week. Among them were famous statesmen, cardinals, musicians, philosophers and scientists, such as Friedrich Nietzsche (1870), the Alpine explorer Albert Heim, Bishop Johannes Vonderach and the English mineral collector Frederick Noel Ashcroft.

With the large increase in mountain tourism, the Hotel SAC and the Maderanertal became known internationally. The mountain guides from Bristen and the surrounding area undertook numerous first ascents with the guests. Several club huts were built within a day's walk from the hotel (Hüfihütte 1899, Windgällenhütte 1905, Etzlihütte 1911, Cavardirashütte 1928, Treschhütte 1947, Hinterbalmhütte, Blackihütte, Bristenseehütte).

The noble guests were carried by porters in litters from Amsteg or Bristen to the hotel. The road to the mountain village of Bristen was built between 1918 and 1922 together with the SBB power station in Amsteg.

After 100 years of ownership by the Indergand family, the mountain guide and innkeeper Hans Z'graggen from Bristen bought the hotel and had an extension built in 1968 to include a large dining room and a garden restaurant. After various changes of ownership, the hotel was temporarily shut down. The Pro Hotel Maderanertal association took on the renovation of the cultural monument. The hotel opened again in 1996.

== See also ==
- List of hotels in Switzerland
- Tourism in Switzerland
