= Meierturm =

Coordinates: 46°46′45″N 8°40′20″E

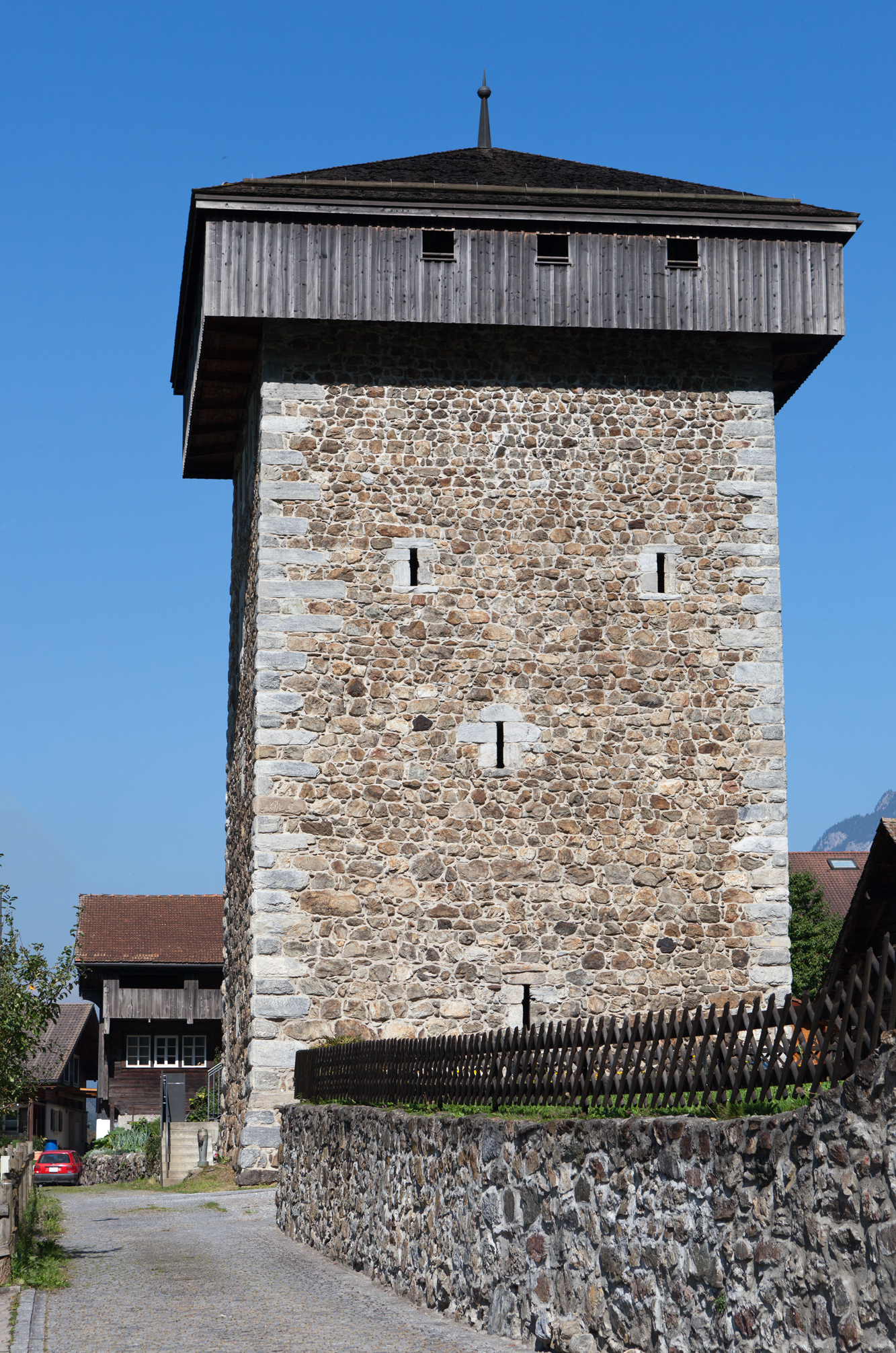
Meierturm

Meierturm is a medieval tower in the municipality of Silenen in the canton of Uri in Switzerland. It is a Swiss heritage site of national significance.

== See also ==
List of castles and fortresses in Switzerland
