= Zwing Uri Castle =

Ruined medieval castle in Switzerland

Coordinates: 46°46′28″N 8°40′14″E

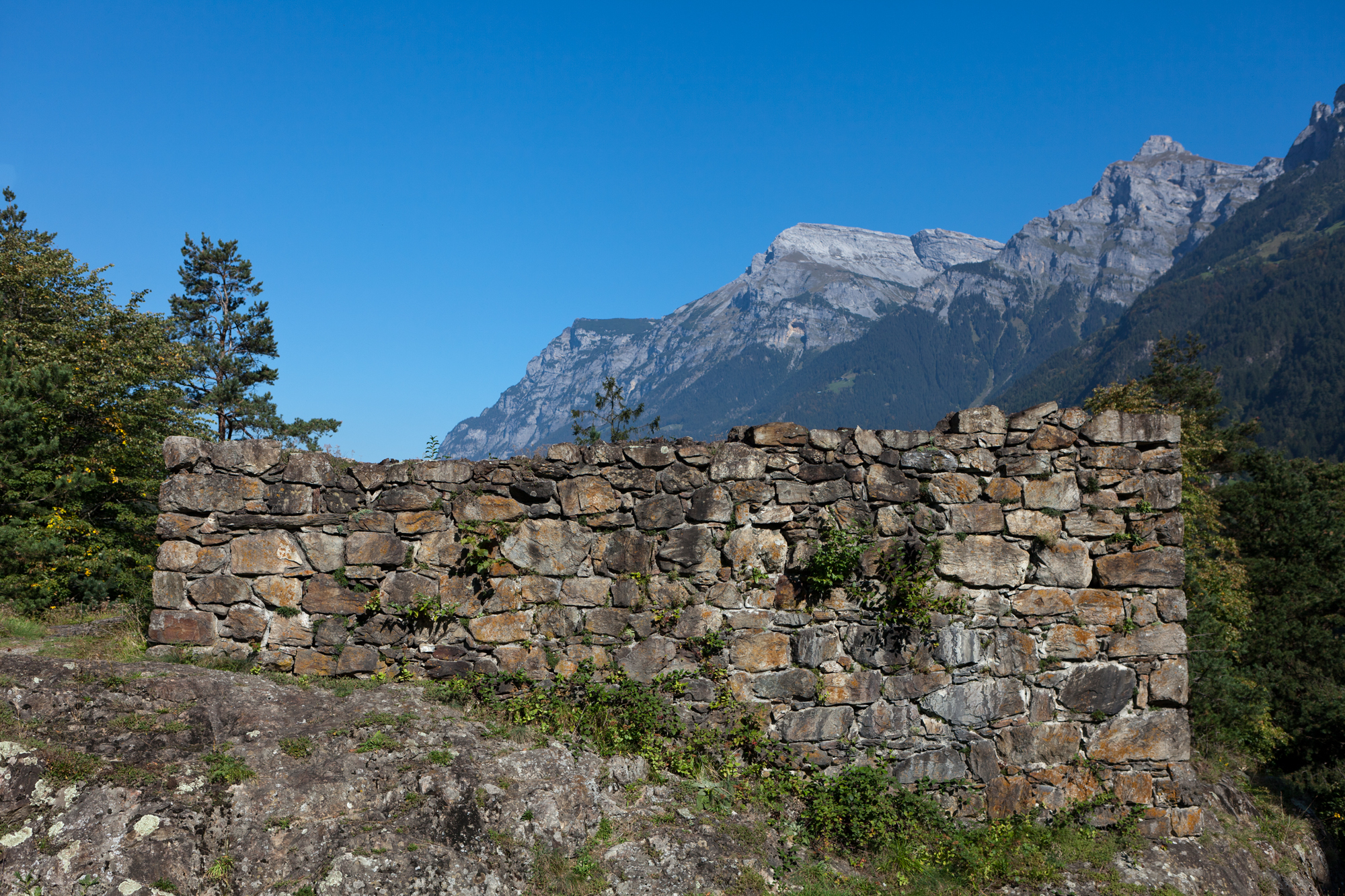
The ruins of Zwing-Uri

Zwing Uri is a ruined medieval castle north of Amsteg, today in the territory of the municipality of Silenen in the canton of Uri in Switzerland. It is a Swiss heritage site of national significance.

The castle is notable for its role in Swiss historiography as the first fortress destroyed in the Burgenbruch at the beginning of the Swiss Confederacy. The slighting of Zwing Uri (Twing Üren) is mentioned in the White Book of Sarnen, a Swiss chronicle of 1470. The event is placed in the year 1307 by the Chronicon Helveticum (1570).

The site had been occupied since the Bronze Age. By 1150, there had been a farmstead with three buildings. By the early 13th century, the dwelling was replaced by a defensive tower. During the period of 1310 to 1320, the tower was still standing, and there are traces of a planned expansion into a full castle with a ring wall and a moat. This expansion was interrupted at about six weeks into the construction work, and the castle was abandoned in ca. 1320, i.e. 13 years after the traditional date of the Burgenbruch.

The site remained unoccupied until 1868, when a restaurant was built, using stones from the ruin. The remains were secured in 1928, when the ruin was acquired by the Schweizerischer Burgenverein. Archaeological excavations of the ruin were performed in 1978.

== See also ==
- List of castles and fortresses in Switzerland
