= Gurtnellen =

- Municipality
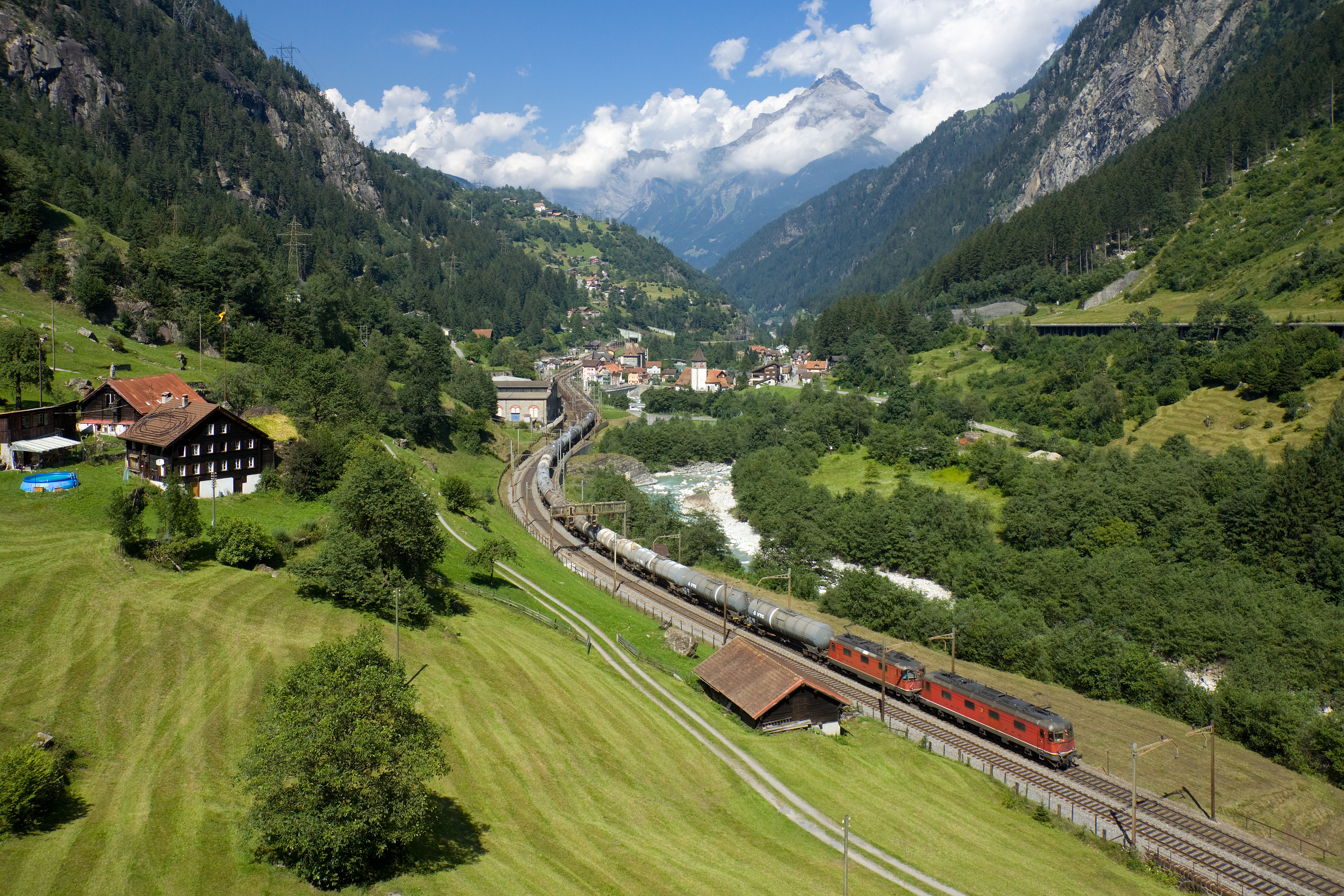

- Coat of arms
- Location of Gurtnellen
- Location within Switzerland Location within Canton of Uri
- Coordinates: 46°43′N 8°37′E
- Country: Switzerland
- Canton: Uri
- District: n.a.

Area
  - Total: 83.35 km^{2} (32.18 sq mi)
- Elevation: 928 m (3,045 ft)

Population (December 2020)
  - Total: 512
  - Density: 6.14/km^{2} (15.9/sq mi)
- Time zone: UTC+01:00 (CET)
  - Summer (DST): UTC+02:00 (CEST)
- Postal code: 6482
- SFOS number: 1209
- ISO 3166 code: CH-UR
- Surrounded by: Andermatt, Erstfeld, Göschenen, Silenen, Tujetsch (GR), Wassen
- Website: www.gurtnellen.ch

Gurtnellen is a village and municipality in the canton of Uri in Switzerland.

== History ==
Gurtnellen is first mentioned in 1257 as Chuno und die Gurteneller. In 1321 it was mentioned as Gruntellon, and in 1359 as Gurtenellen.

== Geography ==
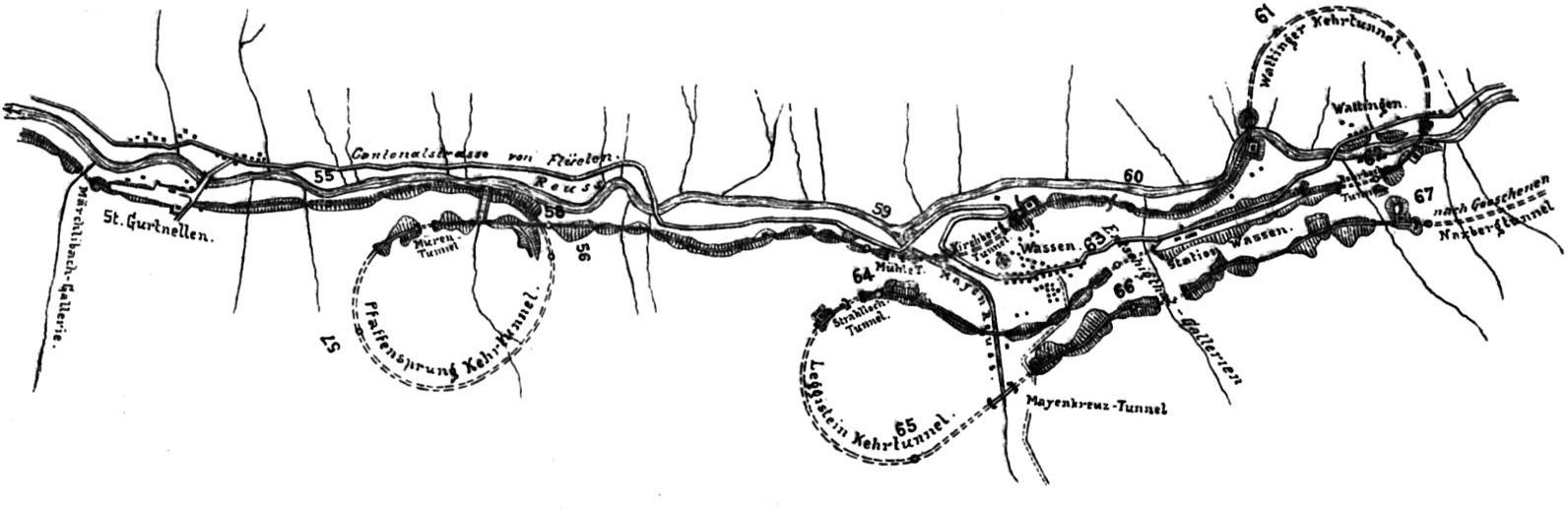
Map showing the Pfaffensprung spiral tunnel outside Gurtnellen

The Saint Joseph parish church and the Reuss river in Gurtnellen

Aerial view from 1600 m by Walter Mittelholzer (1931)

Gurtnellen has an area, as of 2006, of 83.4 km^{2} (32.2 sq mi). Of this area, 11.9% is used for agricultural purposes, while 25.1% is forested. Of the rest of the land, 1.3% is settled (buildings or roads) and the remainder (61.7%) is non-productive (rivers, glaciers or mountains). In the 1993/97 land survey, 16.9% of the total land area was heavily forested, while 5.2% is covered in small trees and shrubbery. Of the agricultural land, 0.0% is used for farming or pastures, while 2.9% is used for orchards or vine crops and 9.0% is used for alpine pastures. Of the settled areas, 0.2% is covered with buildings, 0.1% is industrial, 0.2% is classed as special developments, and 0.8% is transportation infrastructure. Of the unproductive areas, 0.1% is unproductive standing water (ponds or lakes), 0.9% is unproductive flowing water (rivers), 39.3% is too rocky for vegetation, and 21.4% is other unproductive land.

The municipality is located above the Reuss along the Gotthard rail line. It consists of the village sections of Dorf, Wiler, Intschi, Arni as well as part of the area on the left side of the Reuss near Amsteg and Silenen.

== Demographics ==
Gurtnellen has a population (as of 31 December 2020) of 512. As of 2007, 4.4% of the population was made up of foreign nationals. Over the last 10 years the population has decreased at a rate of -8.7%. Most of the population (as of 2000) speaks German (97.3%), with Portuguese being second most common ( 1.6%) and French being third ( 0.5%). As of 2007 the gender distribution of the population was 50.0% male and 50.0% female.

In the 2007 federal election the FDP party received 90.6% of the vote.

The entire Swiss population is generally well educated. In Gurtnellen about 43.9% of the population (between age 25–64) have completed either non-mandatory upper secondary education or additional higher education (either university or a Fachhochschule).

Gurtnellen has an unemployment rate of 0.65%. As of 2005, there were 82 people employed in the primary economic sector and about 38 businesses involved in this sector. 64 people are employed in the secondary sector and there are 3 businesses in this sector. 168 people are employed in the tertiary sector, with 21 businesses in this sector.

The historical population is given in the following table:

year	population
1837	615
1850	675
1880	1,541^{a}
1900	1,112
1920	1,631^{b}
1950	1,132
1970	1,048
1980	813
1990	688
2000	631
2005	640
2007	638

^a Population increase due to construction of the Gotthard rail tunnel.
^b Population increase due to bridge construction and electrification of the Gotthard rail tunnel.
