= Silenen =

- Municipality
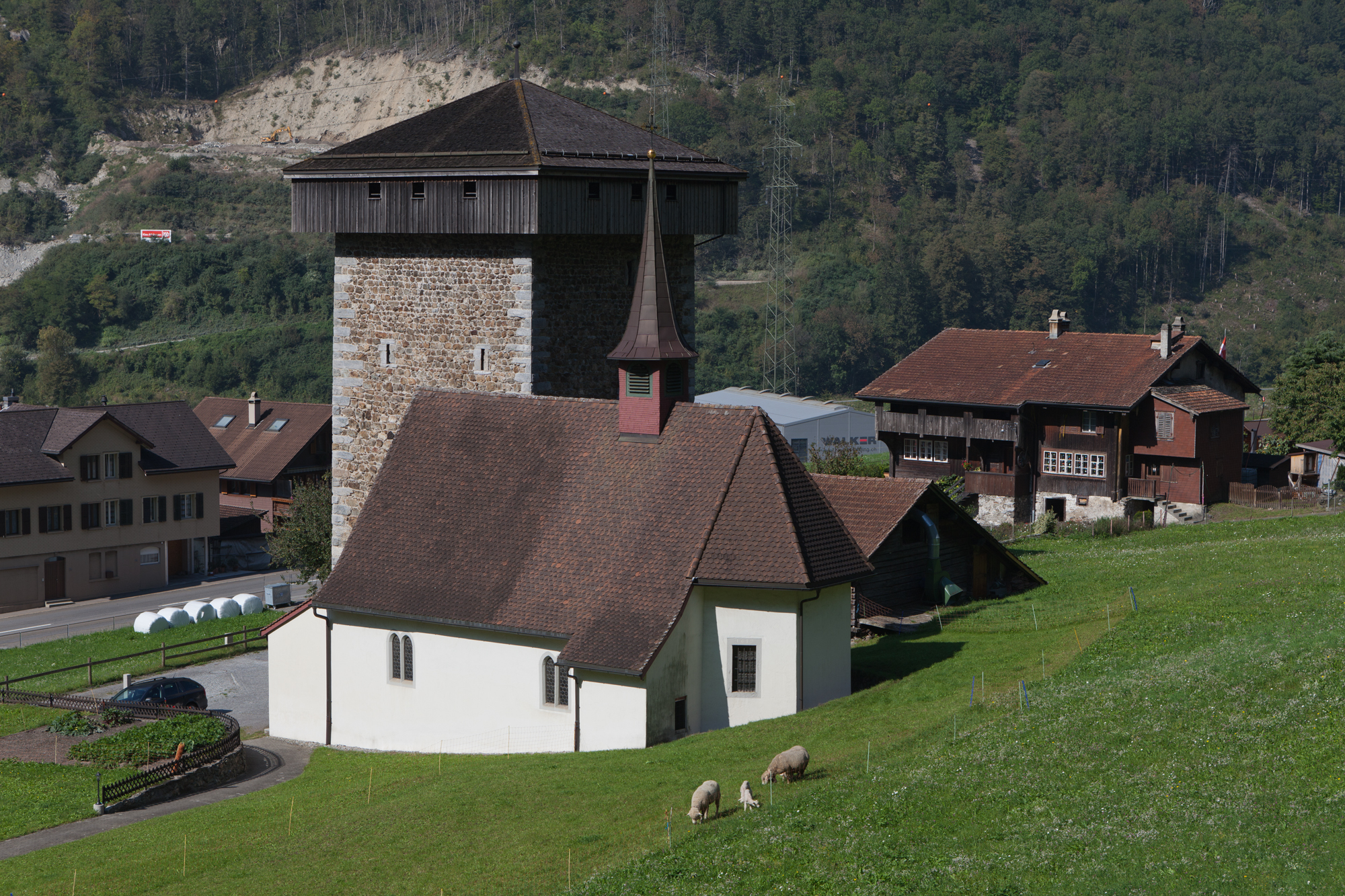

- Flag Coat of arms
- Location of Silenen
- Location within Switzerland Location within Canton of Uri
- Coordinates: 46°47′31″N 8°40′10″E
- Country: Switzerland
- Canton: Uri
- District: n.a.

Area
  - Total: 144.78 km^{2} (55.90 sq mi)
- Elevation: 510 m (1,670 ft)

Population (December 2020)
  - Total: 1,951
  - Density: 13.48/km^{2} (34.90/sq mi)
- Time zone: UTC+01:00 (CET)
  - Summer (DST): UTC+02:00 (CEST)
- Postal codes: 6473 Silenen; 6474 Amsteg; 6475 Bristen
- SFOS number: 1216
- ISO 3166 code: CH-UR
- Localities: Bristen, Amsteg
- Surrounded by: Disentis/Mustér (GR), Erstfeld, Gurtnellen, Linthal (GL), Schattdorf, Spiringen, Tujetsch (GR), Unterschächen
- Website: www.silenen.ch

Silenen is a municipality in the canton of Uri in Switzerland.

== Geography ==
Aerial view from 2000 m by Walter Mittelholzer (1932)

Silenen municipality comprises the villages of Silenen (divided into three parts, Dörfli, Russ, Rusli), Amsteg, and Acherli, besides numerous smaller hamlets or dispersed settlements, including Schützen, Buechholz, Öfibach, Dägerlohn, Frentschenberg, Ried (Vorderried, Hinterried), Maderanerthal valley (St. Anton = Vorderbristen, Bristen = Hinterbristen, Cholplatz, Hälteli, Steinmatte, Schattigmatt etc.), Hofstetten, Silblen, and the Golzeren plateau (Egg, Hüseren, Seewen, etc.)

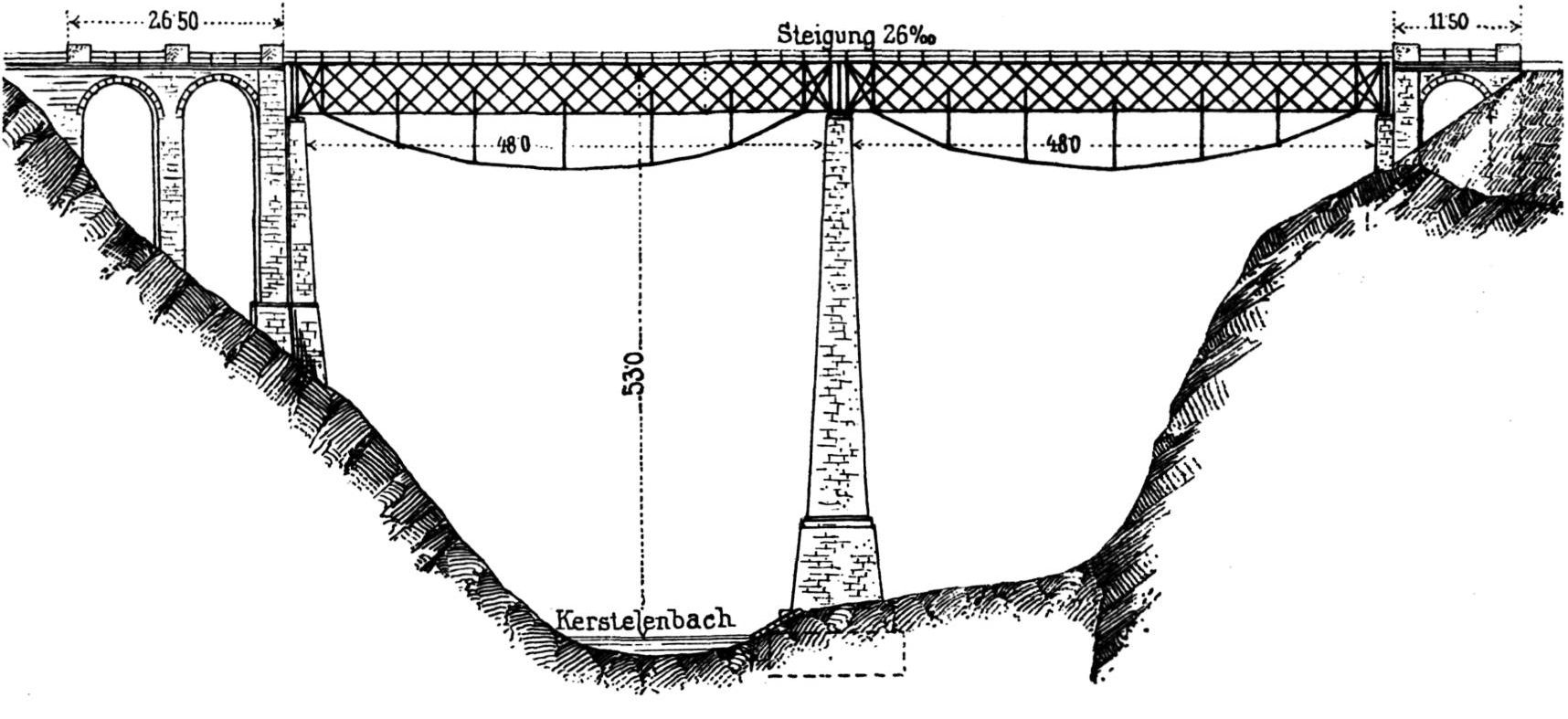
Chärstelenbach Bridge near Amsteg

Silenen has an area, as of 2006, of 144.8 km^{2} (55.9 sq mi). Of this area, 12.8% is used for agricultural purposes (mostly alpine pastures), while 18.3% is forested. Of the rest of the land, 0.7% is settled (buildings or roads) and the remainder (68.1%) is non-productive (mostly mountainous).

Arnisee can be reached by gondola lift from Amsteg.

The Zwing Uri Castle, overlooking Amsteg, has some importance in Swiss historiography as the first fortress destroyed in the Burgenbruch at the beginning of the Swiss Confederacy.

== Demographics ==
Silenen has a population (as of 31 December 2020) of 1,951. As of 2007, 11.7% of the population was made up of foreign nationals. Over the last 10 years the population has grown at a rate of 4.5%. Most of the population (as of 2000) speaks German (98.1%), with Italian being second most common ( 0.2%) and Serbo-Croatian being third ( 0.2%). As of 2007 the gender distribution of the population was 55.3% male and 44.7% female.

In the 2007 federal election the FDP party received 87.4% of the vote.

In Silenen about 52.8% of the population (between age 25-64) have completed either non-mandatory upper secondary education or additional higher education (either university or a Fachhochschule).

Silenen has an unemployment rate of 1.22%. As of 2005, there were 141 people employed in the primary economic sector and about 60 businesses involved in this sector. 117 people are employed in the secondary sector and there are 16 businesses in this sector. 241 people are employed in the tertiary sector, with 50 businesses in this sector.

The historical population is given in the following table:

year	population
1970	2,338
1980	2,115
1990	2,054
2000	2,068
2005	2,282
2007	2,232
