= William Tell (2024 film) =

Historical action film by Nick Hamm

- Theatrical release poster
- Directed by: Nick Hamm
- Screenplay by: Nick Hamm
- Based on: William Tell by Friedrich Schiller
- Produced by: Piers Tempest; Marie-Christine Jaeger-Firmenich; Nick Hamm
- Starring: Claes Bang; Connor Swindells; Golshifteh Farahani; Jonah Hauer-King; Ellie Bamber; Rafe Spall; Emily Beecham; Jonathan Pryce; Ben Kingsley
- Cinematography: Jamie D. Ramsay
- Edited by: Yan Miles
- Music by: Steven Price
- Production companies: Free Turn Films; Tempo Productions; Beta Cinema
- Distributed by: Altitude Film Distribution (United Kingdom); Eagle Pictures (Italy); SquareOne Entertainment (Switzerland)
- Release dates: September 5, 2024 (TIFF); January 10, 2025 (United Kingdom)
- Running time: 133 minutes
- Countries: United Kingdom; Italy; Switzerland
- Language: English
- Budget: $45 million
- Box office: $564,643

William Tell is a 2024 epic historical action film written and directed by Nick Hamm, based on the play of the same name by Friedrich Schiller. It stars Claes Bang as the titular character, as well as Connor Swindells, Golshifteh Farahani, Jonah Hauer-King, Tobias Jowett, Ellie Bamber, Rafe Spall, Emily Beecham, Jonathan Pryce, and Ben Kingsley.

The film had its world premiere at the Toronto International Film Festival on 5 September 2024, and was theatrically released in the United Kingdom on 10 January 2025. It received mixed reviews.

== Plot ==
In the year 1307, Switzerland is a province under the rule of the Austrian royal house of Habsburg. The Swiss people are resenting this foreign occupation, and rebellion is brewing, especially since the Habsburg soldiers brutalize the population at their whim. Some Swiss nobles, like Rudenz of Attinghausen and Werner Stauffacher, try to remain in good standing with the Habsburgs, either out of self-interest, fear of retribution, or - in Rudenz's case - his love for Bertha, the niece of Albert, Duke of Austria and King of Germany. Bertha is of Swiss blood, and she resents her uncle's tyranny over Switzerland.

In the canton of Unterwalden, an Austrian sheriff and tax collector known as "the Wolfshot" arrives at the home of farmer Konrad Baumgarten, and brutally rapes and murders his wife. Enraged by this, Baumgarten murders the Wolfshot, becoming a fugitive. When he attempts to cross a storm-tossed lake to escape his pursuers, he is aided by William Tell, a war-weary Crusade veteran renowned for his skill with the crossbow, now a local huntsman. As a result of the Wolfshot's assassination, King Albert installs Albrecht Gessler as a bailiff to maintain order in the canton of Schwyz. Gessler also pursues Bertha, and Albert encourages the relationship, to Bertha's annoyance.

Baumgarten and Tell seek temporary shelter with Werner Stauffacher, one of Tell's fellow Crusader, and his wife Gertrude. While searching for Baumgarten, Gessler and his enforcer Stussi enter the Stauffacher household. Not recognizing Baumgarten, Gessler and Stussi leave, but Gessler nevertheless suspects the Stauffachers.

Gertrude urges Tell to help the Swiss organize a rebellion against the Austrians, but Tell is reluctant to involve himself. He still agrees to help Baumgarten and Werner in contacting his friend Walter Fürst, a priest in Altdorf, to act as a spokesman in uniting the cantons. During the journey, the trio stumble across a village being pillaged by the Austrians and assist a young farmer, Arnold von Melchtal, in killing the soldiers and euthanizing his mortally wounded father. The four of them arrive in Altdorf to find that the Austrians have occupied it and are overworking the peasants, but they manage to make contact with Fürst that night, and the five of them begin plotting to unify the cantons against the Habsburgs.

To further humiliate the Swiss, Stussi has a post erected in the centre of Altdorf, and an Austrian helmet placed on its tip. The next morning, a public decree is passed, ordering the population to bow to the helmet when passing by the post, in reverence to the king's authority. Tell returns back to his farm, in the canton of Uri, where he reminisces on his time in the Crusades, where he met his wife and killed his commanding officer to save her from death.

King Albert requests that Gessler teach Bertha how to hunt. As Gessler and Bertha spend the morning together, surrounded by guards, he still does not appeal to her. Among the guards is Rudenz; as Stussi arrives to inform Gessler of the planned Swiss rebellion, Bertha privately urges Rudenz to choose his people over his love for her. She confesses that her uncle is using her to keep Rudenz loyal to Austria, but that her love for him is genuine.

Tell returns to Altdorf with his wife and son Walter. When Tell and Walter refuse to bow before the post, Stussi and his henchmen have cause to arrest him. As the people of Altdorf rise in protest, Gessler, Rudenz, Bertha, and the guards arrive. For his own cruel amusement and despite the outcry of all onlookers, Gessler challenges Tell to shoot an apple off his son's head in return for his freedom. Rudenz protests and even challenges Gessler's authority only to be detained. Baumgarten surrenders himself to Gessler in a bid to have Tell released, but Gessler kills him. To prevent any more needless death, Tell agrees to the challenge and succeeds in hitting the apple. In the aftermath, Tell confesses that he would have struck down Gessler if he had killed his son, so Gessler has Tell seized and locked away. Ordering Stussi to take Tell away by boat, Gessler then tries to force himself upon Bertha, and when she tries to stab him, he overwhelms her, and she is also placed in Stussi's charge. In the commotion, Melchtal helps Rudenz escape Altdorf and return to Attinghausen, just in time for Rudenz to speak briefly to his uncle shortly before his death. Rudenz now pledges himself to his people's cause, and that night, in a hidden cave near Rütli, the leaders of the cantons of Unterwalden, Schwyz, and Uri assemble and unify their forces.

Tell is transported across the same lake over which he carried Baumgarten to safety, tied to the ship's mast while Bertha is locked up in the hold. A storm strikes, grounding the vessel at the lake's shore. Bertha takes advantage of the storm to break free, free Tell, and escape into the nearby woods, learning from the local huntsmen that Gessler is on his way to Küssnacht.

After learning that Stussi lost both Tell and Bertha, Gessler allows him to redeem himself by taking command at Castle Sarnen and holding it as he travels to Küssnacht. Bertha guides Tell through the mountains, and he takes shots at Gessler's caravan in a ravine leading to the town, but only wounds him and is forced to flee. Before she parts with Tell to try and dissuade King Albert from helping Gessler, Bertha reminds Tell to pursue his goal with more caution instead of blind revenge. King Albert orders Gessler to take charge at Altdorf and await reinforcements, while Tell joins the resistance, who are encamped near the town. His wife tells him that an attack on Sarnen was betrayed by a turncoat, which had allowed Stussi's forces to ambush the Swiss and kill Gertrude Stauffacher. Tell assumes leadership of the resistance, reigniting their hopes for a free Switzerland, and helping them prepare for an assault on Altdorf.

At Castle Habsburg in the Aargau, King Albert is about to send his reinforcements to Gessler when Bertha interrupts. When she stands up to her uncle and his tyranny, she is arrested and sentenced to death, but she is freed by her cousin Leopold, allowing her to assassinate Albert in his bed. While Tell challenges Gessler at the town gates of Altdorf to draw his attention, several resistance fighters enter the town through a secret tunnel and open the city gates the next morning, allowing Tell's forces to storm the town. During the fighting, Gessler kills Rudenz and Werner Stauffacher, before capturing Walter and holding him and the town's people hostage. King Albert's army appears on the hills around the city, but retreats after learning of their king's death. As Gessler's soldiers surrender and Stussi abandons him, Walter fights free. Tell prepares to kill Gessler, but spares him upon Walter's insistence and walks away from him. Three days later, as Tell wearily attempts to return to his old life, Bertha reunites with him and reports that Albert's daughter Agnes has sworn vengeance on the Swiss people, including him, for her father's death, marking the start for another, bloodier conflict for Switzerland's freedom.

== Cast ==
- Claes Bang as William Tell, a fabled Crusader and Huntsman who led the Swiss in a rebellion against the Austrians
  - Éanna Hardwicke as Young Tell
- Connor Swindells as Albrecht Gessler, an Austrian nobleman who was made Bailiff for Altdorf
- Golshifteh Farahani as Suna Tell, Tell's wife whom he met in Palestine during the Crusades
- Tobias Jowett as Walter Tell, William and Suna's son
- Jonah Hauer-King as Rudenz, heir to the Swiss House of Attinghausen
- Ellie Bamber as Bertha, a half-Swiss Habsburg noblewoman, a niece of King Albert I and Rudenz's love interest
- Rafe Spall as Werner Stauffacher, a friend and former comrade to William Tell who helps upstart the rebellion
- Emily Beecham as Gertrude Stauffacher, Werner's wife
- Jonathan Pryce as Attinghausen, Rudenz's elderly uncle and nobleman who is the Patriarch of his household
- Ben Kingsley as King Albert of Austria
- Jess Douglas-Welsh as Queen Agnes, Albert's daughter, and Bertha's cousin, who later becomes the ruler of Austria
- David Moorst as Leopold, Bertha's cousin
- Theo Hamm as Duke John, Bertha's cousin
- Amar Chadha-Patel as Walter Furst, the priest of Altdorf
- Sam Keeley as Konrad Baumgarten, a Swiss farmer who became a fugitive after killing The Wolfshot
- Solly McLeod as Arnold von Melchtal, a young farmer who joined the rebellion after the Austrians pillaged his village
- Colin Bennett as Heinrich von Melchtal, Arnold's Father
- Billy Postlethwaite as The Wolfshot, a ruthless Austrian tax collector who was the local governor
- Jake Dunn as Stussi, Gessler's enforcer
- Aron von Andrian as Sergeant Heinrich, the commander of Gessler's personal guard
- Paul Bullion as Commander Armgard, the Austrian Commander in charge of the Habsburg forces in Switzerland
- Jolyon Coy as Reding, a landowner and rival to Stauffacher who joins the Swiss Rebellion
- Diarmaid Murtagh as a Master Builder from Altdorf

== Production ==
The production, which would be directed and adapted by Nick Hamm, received funding to shoot in South Tyrol in June 2023.

In October 2023, the production was fully announced, with Claes Bang set to star as the titular folk hero. Connor Swindells, Ellie Bamber, Golshifteh Farahani, Jonah Hauer-King, Rafe Spall, Emily Beecham, Jonathan Pryce and Ben Kingsley were also cast, with production entering its final week in Italy. Post-production was underway by May 2024. Almut Suerbaum, who teaches medieval language and culture at Oxford University, was the historical adviser to the production.

== Reception ==
=== Critical response ===
On the review aggregator website Rotten Tomatoes, 54% of 56 critics' reviews are positive, with an average rating of 5.6/10. The website's consensus reads: "William Tell finds a worthy embodiment of the folk hero in the capable Claes Bang, but this historical epic repeats too many familiar beats to stir up its own distinctive legend." Metacritic, which uses a weighted average, assigned the film a score of 52 out of 100, based on 12 critics, indicating "mixed or average" reviews.

Helen O'Hara of Empire gave the film three out of five stars and wrote, "This old-fashioned tale of folk heroism and hardy underdogs benefits from solid performances and spectacular vistas, but it loses points for a sequel-baiting ending."

=== Box office ===
As of 7 April 2025, the film grossed $264,637 worldwide.
