= Stauffacherin =

Swiss legendary figure

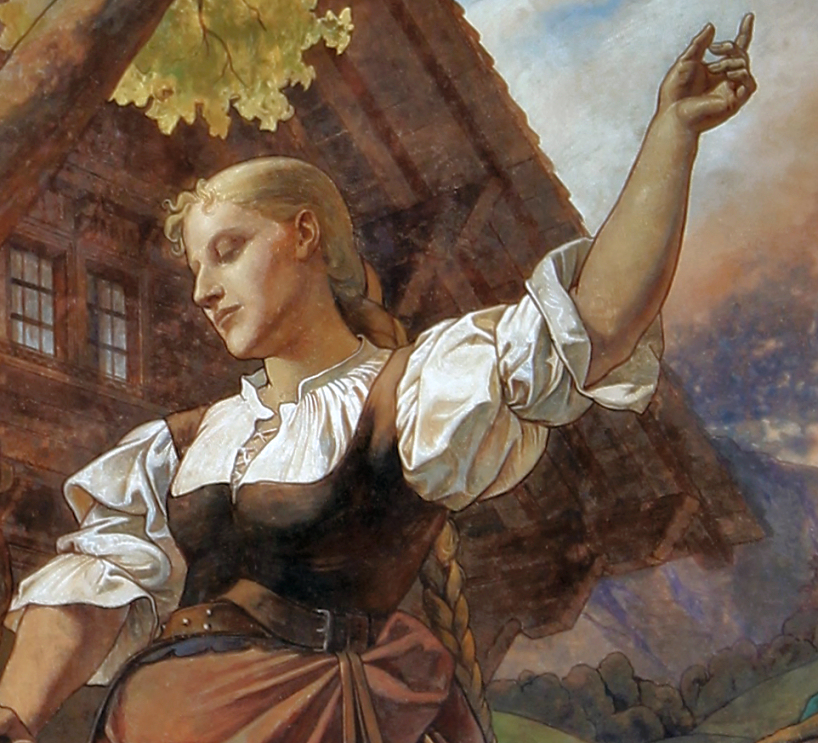
Painting by Ferdinand Wagner of the Stauffacherin at the Town Hall in Schwyz

The Stauffacherin (sometimes given the names Gertrud Stauffacher, Hedwig Stauffacher, or Hanna Stauffacher) is a Swiss legendary figure. According to Swiss folklore, she was the wife of Werner Stauffacher, the Landammann of the Canton of Schwyz and a founding father of the Old Swiss Confederacy. She was depicted in Friedrich Schiller's 1804 play William Tell as an advisor to her husband, advocating for Swiss independence from Habsburg rule. The image of the Stauffacherin, often viewed as the feminine counterpart to Wilhelm Tell, has become a symbol for Swiss national pride, spiritual national defence, democracy, and women's suffrage.

== Legend and portrayal ==
The Stauffacher family are identified with the town of Steinen bei Schwyz, with the name appearing in documents there around 1300. The Stauffacherin does not have her own given name in the original Swiss legend, but is identified as the wife of the Landammann of Schwyz, Werner Stauffacher. She is first mentioned around 1470 in the White Book of Sarnen as an unnamed advisor to her husband who encouraged him to assist in founding the Old Swiss Confederacy. In 1788 she appeared in the Historical Dictionary of Switzerland. The Stauffacherin first appears in the legend when the Austrian bailiff threatens her husband after he built a stone house, which peasants were not allowed to have. She defends her husbands work, and insists that God will look after them. Together with the mountain farmers of Uri and Unterwalden, the Stauffachers defended the valleys of Schwyz from Austrian forces and contributed towards Swiss independence. According to the legend, she inspires her husband to take part in the Rütlischwur.

In the 1804 play William Tell by Friedrich Schiller, she is given the name Gertrud Stauffacher. In the play, the Stauffacherin advises her husband, after his meeting with the Imperial Bailiff Albrecht Gessler, and advises him to take action towards independence from Habsburg rule. She makes a strong impression with her husband, stating that she is prepared to accept war, ruin, and even death for the cause, telling Stauffacher, "Look forward, Werner, and not behind you." In the 2013 historical drama television series Die Schweizer, she is given the name Hanna Stauffacher. She has also been referred to as Hedwig Stauffacher.

In Gottfried Keller's 1874 novella The Lost Laughter, the character Gertrud Glor von Schwanau is called "a Stauffacherin", as the name "denoted the ideal of a clever and strong Swiss woman, a star and ornament of the house and consolation of the Fatherland."

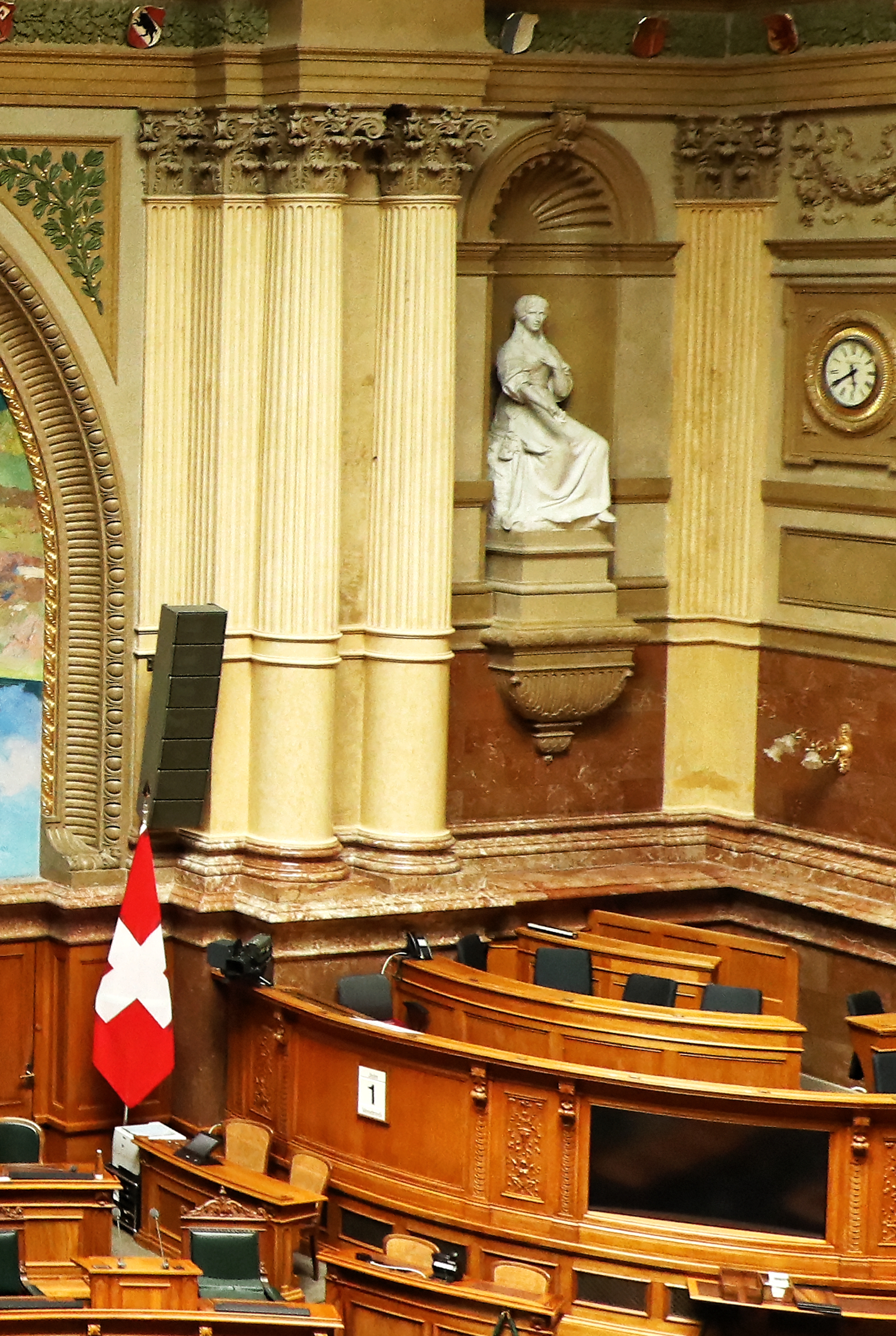
Statue of the Stauffacherin in the Federal Palace

In 1896 at the first Swiss Women's Congress, a women's committee in Bern was commissioned to create a stone memorial to the Stauffacherin. In 1898 the sculptor Max Leu submitted a design in the German journal Die Gartenlaube. In his representation of her, the Stauffacherin towers over her husband and bears the inscription Look forward, Werner. The design was never brought to fruition due to a lack of funds. In 1902 the a statue of Stauffacherin, designed by Antonio and Giuseppe Chiattone, was placed in the chamber of the National Council in the Federal Palace of Switzerland, honored as the "bearer of the idea" of independence, alongside Wilhelm Tell.

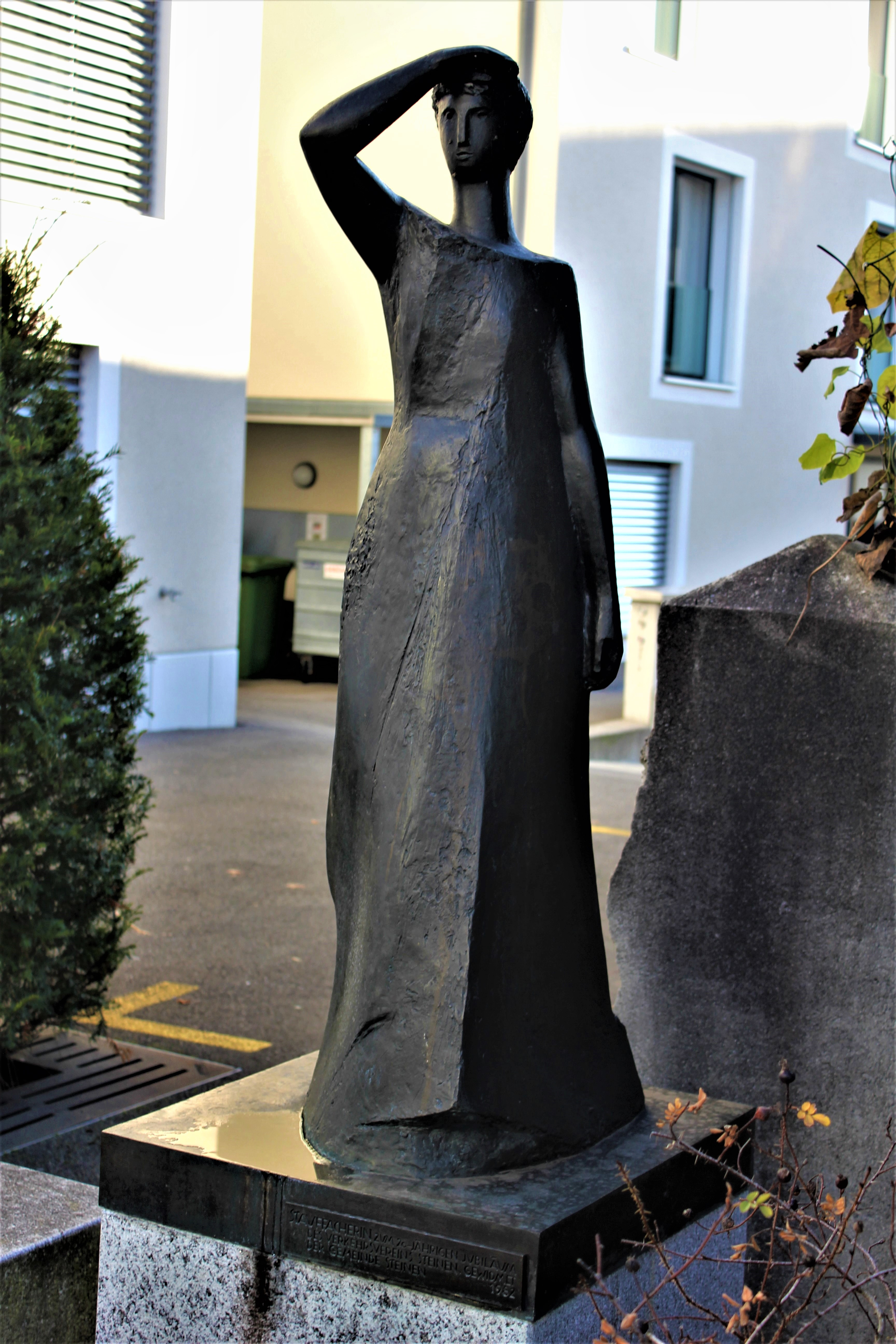
Josef Rickenbauer's 1976 statue Stauffacherin in Steinen

Since 1892 a sculpture of the Stauffacherin by Josef Rickenbauer has stood in Steinen.

In 1899 the Union of Young Stauffacherinnen was created in order to educate and provide opportunities to disadvantaged and impoverished young women. The union, funded by donations, provided educational courses in character and manners, ethics, religion, and art. In 1922, the Stauffacherinnenbund Thalwil was founded in Thalwil as a non-profit organization. In Zürich, near Stauffacherstrasse, there is an organization called the Haus zur Stauffacherin that opened in 1938 to help women.

In 1891, on the occasion of the first celebration of Swiss National Day, Ferdinand Wagner painted a depiction of the Stauffacherin, Werner Stauffacher, and the Bailiff Gessler on the façade of the Town Hall of Schwyz.

In the 1923 silent film William Tell, she is portrayed by Agnes Straub. She is played by Franziska Kinz in the 1934 film William Tell.

In 1934 the historian Maria Waser praised the Stauffacherin as "proud and indomintable" and for her "love of freedom".

In 2004 the historian Elisabeth Joris, a specialist in gender history, gave a lecture about the "unequal career" between Wilhelm Tell and Gertrud Stauffacher.

In the 2024 film William Tell, Gertrude Stauffacher is portrayed by Emily Beecham.
