= William Tell (1934 film) =

- Cover of the film's Illustrierter Film-Kurier number
- German: Wilhelm Tell
- Directed by: Heinz Paul
- Written by: Hans Curjel; Hanns Johst; Max Maxudian; Wilhelm Stöppler; Heinz Paul
- Based on: William Tell by Friedrich Schiller
- Produced by: Ralph Scotoni
- Starring: Hans Marr; Conrad Veidt; Emmy Göring; Olaf Bach
- Cinematography: Sepp Allgeier; Franz Josef Dahinden; Franz Weihmayr
- Edited by: Paul May; Lena Neumann
- Music by: Marceau Van Hoorebecke; Herbert Windt; Jean Yatove
- Production companies: Terra Film; Schweizer Film-Finanzierungs
- Distributed by: Terra Film
- Release date: 12 January 1934
- Running time: 99 minutes
- Countries: Germany; Switzerland
- Language: German

William Tell (German: Wilhelm Tell) is a 1934 historical drama film directed by Heinz Paul and starring Hans Marr, Conrad Veidt and Emmy Göring. It is based on the 1804 play William Tell by Friedrich Schiller about the Swiss folk hero William Tell. It was made in Germany by Terra Film, with a separate English-language version supervised by Manning Haynes also being released. It was shot at the Marienfelde Studios of Terra Film in Berlin with location shooting in Switzerland. Veidt, who had recently given sympathetic performances of Jews in Jew Suss (1934) and The Wandering Jew, was detained by the authorities while working on the film. It was only after pressure from the British Foreign Office that he was eventually released. The film is also known by the alternative title The Legend of William Tell.

== Cast ==
- Hans Marr as Guillaume Tell
- Conrad Veidt as Gessler
- Emmy Göring as Hedwig Tell (credited as Emmy Sonnemann)
- Olaf Bach as Arnold von Melchthal
- Eugen Klöpfer as Heinrich von Melchtal
- Maly Delschaft as Barbara von Melchthal
- Theodor Loos as Werner Stauffacher
- Franziska Kinz as Gertrud Stauffacher
- Carl de Vogt as Konrad Baumgarten
- Käthe Haack as gardener
- Fritz Hofbauer as Walter Fürst
- Detlef Willecke as Walter, Tell's son
- Wolfdieter Hollender as little Wilhelm, Tell's youngest son
- Werner Schott as Vogt Landenberg
- Friedrich Ettel as Advocatus in Wolfenschiessen
- Josef Peterhans as Father Rösselmann
- Herma Clement as Armgard
- Paul Bildt as Schultheiß of Lucerne
- Max Hochstetter as Imperial Hauptmann
- Willem Haardt as Imperial Hauptmann
- Heinrich Schroth as Imperial Hauptmann
- Georg H. Schnell as Imperial Stadtholder

== See also ==
- William Tell (1923), also with Hans Marr and Conrad Veidt

== Bibliography ==
- Hull, David Stewart (1969). Film in the Third Reich: A Study of the German Cinema, 1933–1945. Berkeley, CA: University of California Press. ISBN 0520014898.
- Wood, Linda. British Films, 1927–1939. British Film Institute, 1986.
