= William Tell (1923 film) =

1923 film

- Theatrical film poster
- German: Wilhelm Tell
- Directed by: Rudolf Dworsky; Rudolf Walther-Fein
- Written by: Willy Rath
- Starring: Hans Marr; Conrad Veidt; Erich Kaiser-Titz
- Cinematography: Guido Seeber
- Production company: Althoff-Ambos-Film
- Distributed by: Aafa-Film
- Release date: 23 August 1923
- Running time: 85 minutes
- Country: Weimar Republic
- Languages: Silent; German intertitles

William Tell (German: Wilhelm Tell) is a 1923 German silent adventure film directed by Rudolf Dworsky and Rudolf Walther-Fein and starring Hans Marr, Conrad Veidt, and Erich Kaiser-Titz. The film portrays the story of the legendary Swiss national hero William Tell. The sets were designed by Rudi Feld. It premiered at the Marmorhaus in Berlin.

== Cast ==
- Hans Marr as Wilhelm Tell
- Conrad Veidt as Hermann Gessler
- Erich Kaiser-Titz as Emperor Albrecht I
- Emil Rameau as Chancellor
- Fritz Kampers as Rudolf the Harra
- Hermann Vallentin as Wolffenschießen
- Josef Peterhans as Landenberger
- Erna Morena as Berta von Bruneck
- Käthe Haack as Agi, her partner
- Max Gülstorff as Attinghausen
- Johannes Riemann as Ulrich von Rudenz
- Xenia Desni as Hedwig Tell
- Otto Gebühr as Heinrich von Melchthal
- Theodor Becker as Konrad Baumgarten
- Carl Ebert as Arnold von Melchthal (as Karl Ebert)
- Grete Reinwald as Armgard Baumgarten, his wife
- Eduard von Winterstein as Stauffacher
- Robert Leffler as Rösselmann, Father
- Wilhelm Diegelmann as Uri's bull
- Agnes Straub as Stauffacherin
- Willi Müller as Walter, Tell's son
- Hans Peter Peterhans as Wilhelm, Tell's boy

== See also ==
- William Tell (1934 film), also with Hans Marr and Conrad Veidt
