= Rütli Oath =

Legendary oath taken at the foundation of the Old Swiss Confederacy

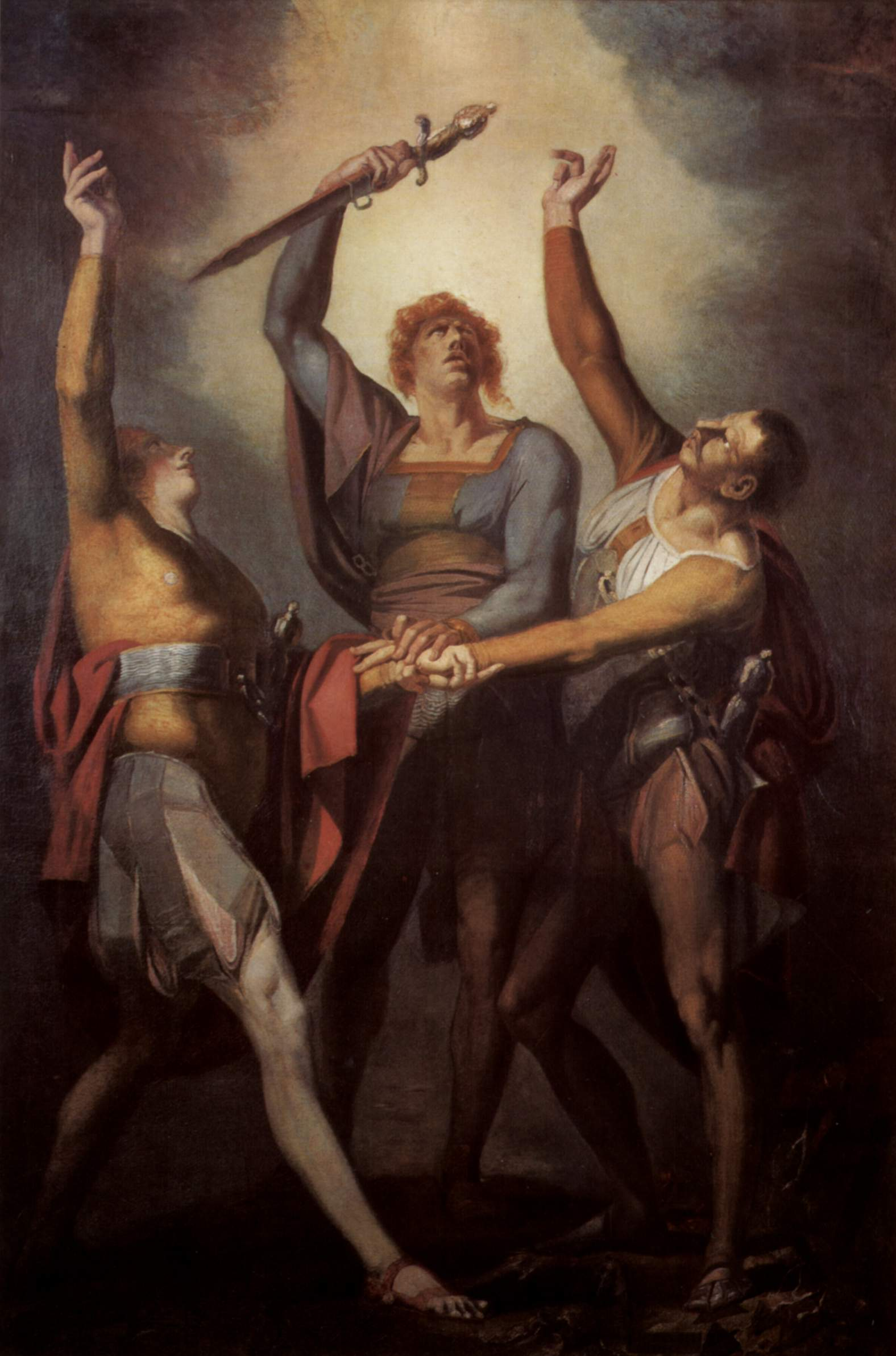
Oath on the Rütli, Henry Fuseli, 1780

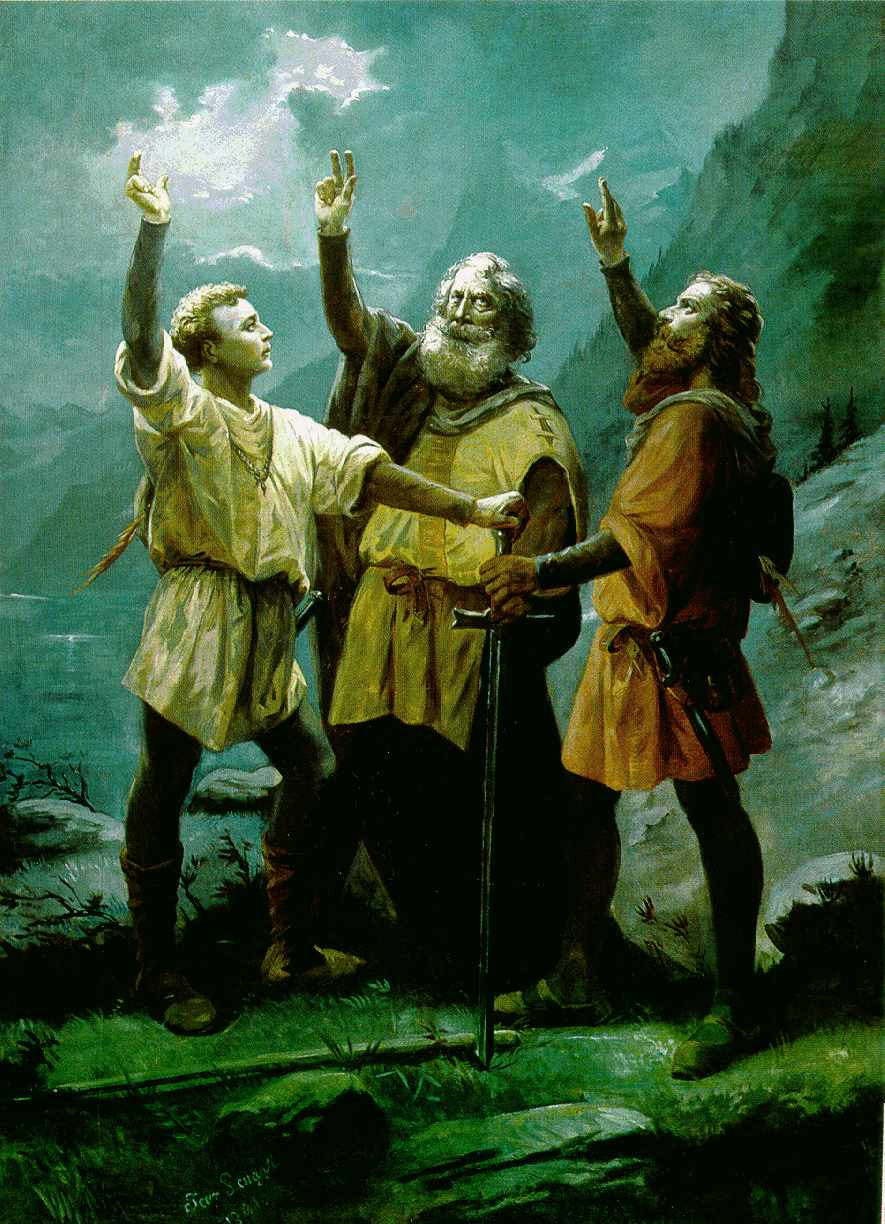
Jean Renggli (1891)

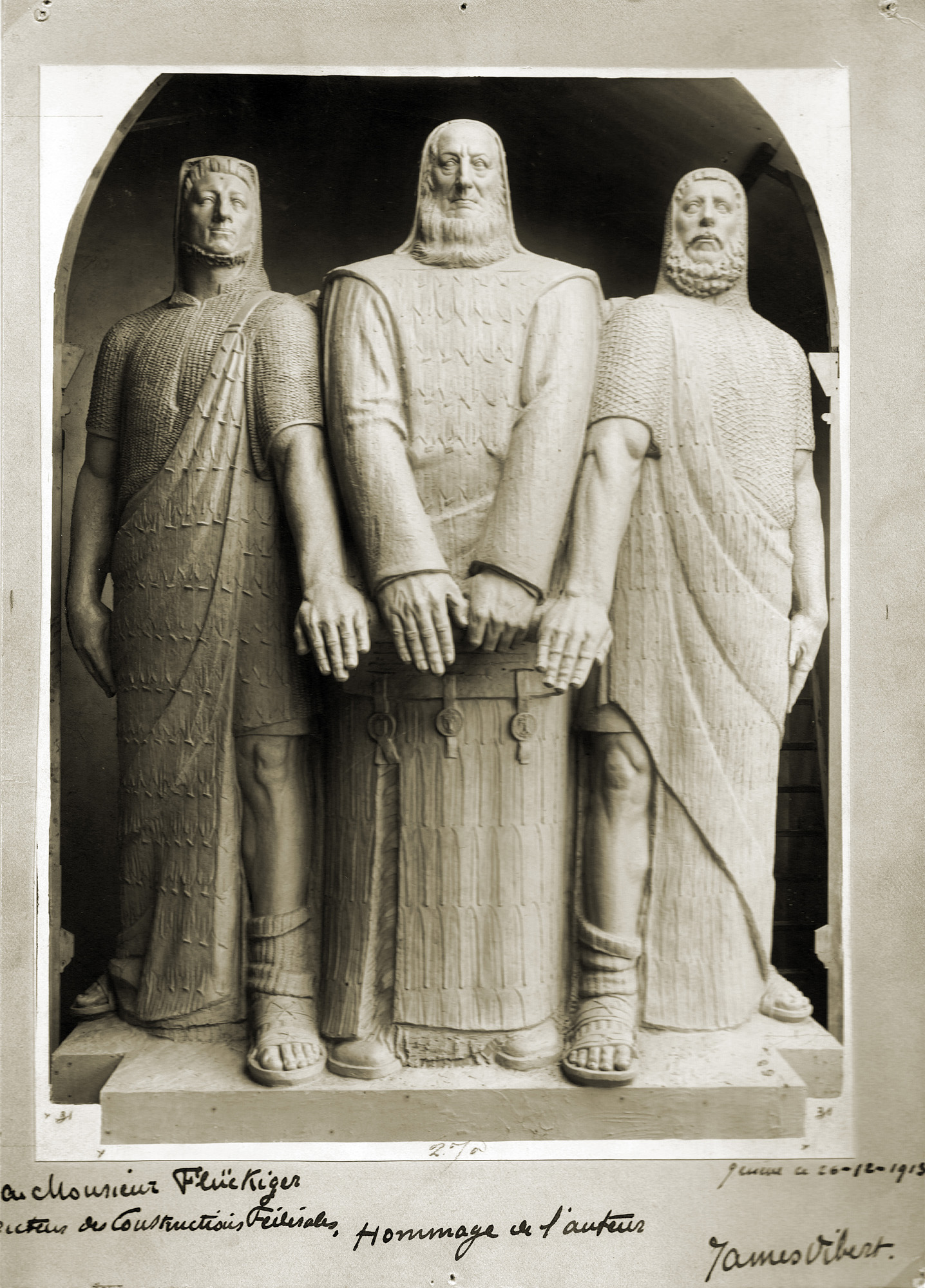
James Vibert (1913)

The Rütli Oath (German: Rütlischwur, Swiss Standard German pronunciation: [ˈryːtliˌʃvuːr]) is the legendary oath taken at the foundation of the Old Swiss Confederacy (traditionally dated to 1307) by the representatives of the three founding cantons, Uri, Schwyz, and Unterwalden. It is named after the site of the oath taking, the Rütli, a meadow above Lake Uri near Seelisberg. Recorded in Swiss historiography from the 15th century, the oath is notably featured in the 19th century play William Tell (Wilhelm Tell) by Friedrich Schiller.

== Early Swiss historiography ==
The Rütli Oath is first mentioned in the White Book of Sarnen (written 1470, based on a source dated c. 1420). The account in the White Book of Sarnen mentions how Beringer von Landenberg, the reeve of Unterwalden, ordered the confiscation of oxen from the farmer at Melchi (Sachseln). The farmer's son attacked the reeve's servants and escaped to Uri, and the father was blinded in retaliation. A little later, reeve Wolfenschiessen was slain by Konrad von Baumgarten of Altzellen for attempted rape of his wife. Werner Stauffacher of Schwyz was threatened by reeve Gessler because he had dared to build a stone house. Stauffacher also escaped to Uri, and, after deliberating with his wife Gertrud Stauffacher sought fellow campaigners against the reeves. This led to the famous oath between Walter and Arnold, and the group would grow quickly. This account is followed by the story of William Tell and the Burgenbruch, followed by the Rütli Oath itself, taken by Walter Fürst of Uri, Werner Stauffacher of Schwyz and Arnold von Melchtal of Unterwalden. The Tellenlied (c. 1477) names Wilhelm Tell as the "first oath-taker" (der erste Eydgnoss). The Tellenspiel of Uri (1512) replaces Fürst with Tell in the role of the oath-taker on behalf of Uri. Jacob Stampfer depicted the oath scene on his Bundestaler (c. 1546). The coin legend dates the event to 1296, and the three oath-takers are named as Wilhelm Tell von Ure, Stouffacher von Schwytz and Erni von Underwalden.

The report from Chronicon Helveticum by Aegidius Tschudi (c. 1570) became the canonical form in Swiss historiography. Tschudi retains the names of the three oath-takers (Eidgenossen) already mentioned in the White Book of Sarnen (1470), Werner Stauffacher for Schwyz, Walter Fürst for Uri and Arnold of Melchtal for Unterwalden.

The figures of the three oath takers or Eidgenossen during the 16th century merged with the legend of William Tell and became known as "the Three Tells". Impersonations of the Three Tells in historical costume played a role during the Swiss peasant war of 1653. Tschudi dates the event to 8 November 1307.

== Historical context ==
The historicity of the oath, and more specifically the Rütli as the site of the oath, is uncorroborated outside of the account in the White Book of Sarnen, dated to about a century after the purported event. The historicity of the event is thus unverifiable, but it is not implausible, as the 1307 date given by Tschudi falls within a period of similar treaties between the cantons, including the Federal Charter of 1291, the pact of Brunnen of 1315, and the pact of Uri and Urseren of 1317. The traditional date of 1307 for the first "conspiracy" between the three founding cantons is made plausible by the suggestion due to Roger Sablonier (2008) that the Federal Charter of "1291" may have been slightly pre-dated, and should be placed in the context of the inheritance of territories in Schwyz by Wernher von Homberg in 1309. Later pacts of similar nature, reflecting the early growth of the Old Swiss Confederacy, are those with Lucerne in 1332, and the Zürich guild revolution of 1336. The larger context is that of the communal movement in medieval Europe, which was countered by the imperial Golden Bull of 1356. This conflict escalated, in the Swiss case, in the Battle of Sempach of 1386.

== Modern reception ==
=== Schiller's Tell ===
In Friedrich Schiller's play William Tell, written in 1804, this oath of the mentioned three men takes place in Walter Fürst's house in Altdorf and basically consists of a promise to meet again on 1 August on the Rütli meadow and to bring with them leading and brave men of the three cantons to decide upon a common action plan. Most notably, among the representatives of Unterwalden was Konrad Baumgarten, a free and wealthy man who killed, in his own residence, the local Habsburg sheriff Wolfenschiessen with an axe in defence of his wife Itta Baumgarten against the sheriff's trespass and inappropriate attempts to approach her. On the other hand, William Tell refused the invitation to come to the Rütli as he was of the opinion that the strong shall act on his own and was skeptical about any common actions.

The most famous version of the oath is no doubt that found in the play:

German wording	Approximate English translation
Wir wollen sein ein einzig Volk von Brüdern, in keiner Not uns trennen und Gefahr. Wir wollen frei sein, wie die Väter waren, eher den Tod, als in der Knechtschaft leben. Wir wollen trauen auf den höchsten Gott und uns nicht fürchten vor der Macht der Menschen.	We want to be a single People of brethren, Never to part in danger nor distress. We want to be free, as our fathers were, And rather die than live in slavery. We want to trust in the one highest God; And never be afraid of human power.

The three Landamänner (canton chiefs) of Uri, Schwyz and Unterwalden represented in Schiller's Tell as taking the oath are those who have historically held office in 1291, Werner von Attinghausen for Uri, Konrad ab Yberg for Schwyz, and Konrad Baumgarten for Unterwalden.

=== Significance in Swiss national identity ===
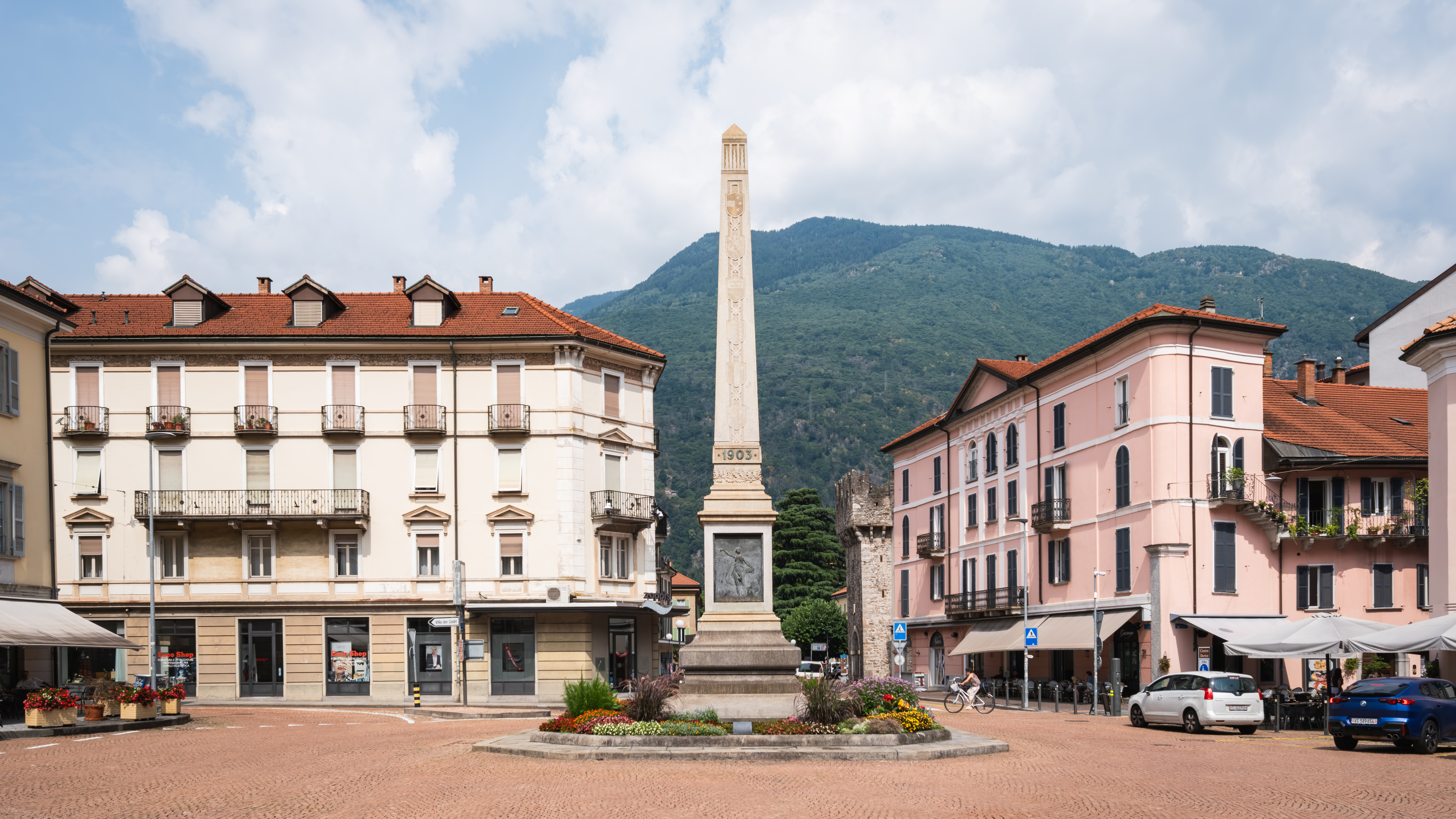
Commemorative obelisk of Bellinzona featuring the Rütli Oath

The building of Switzerland as a federal state in the first half of the 19th century (1803–1848) revived symbols of the period of growth of the Old Swiss Confederacy in the Late Middle Ages, including the legends of William Tell and Arnold Winkelried and the Rütli oath. Patriotic songs such as the Sempacherlied as well as Schiller's play had an important position, and shooting competitions or tirs became an important symbol of the common cause and military readiness of the Confederacy. After the establishment of the federal state, the Rütli oath became associated with the Swiss Federal Charter, a document dated to 1291. This choice was not straightforward, as it went against Tschudi's date of 1307, and historians could enumerate a total of 82 similar documents of the period of 1251 to 1386. The decision was motivated pragmatically, as the modern Swiss capital of Bern in 1891 was going to celebrate the 700th anniversary of the city's foundation and it was convenient to place the 600th anniversary of the Confederacy in the same year. Especially in Central Switzerland, the opportunistic re-dating of the event was resented, and the Rütli oath continued to be dated to 1307 well into the 20th century. Accordingly, the 600th anniversary of the Confederacy was celebrated again in 1907, this time in Altdorf.

It was only after the celebration of the 650th anniversary in 1941, seen as an important symbol of Swiss independence in times of war, that the date of 1291 became universally associated with the Rütli oath. The Swiss national holiday on 1 August marks the date of the Federal Charter (dated to "the beginning of August, 1291), and thus the Rütli oath. Following a public vote on 26 September 1993, 1 August has been an official national holiday since 1994.

The name of the Swiss Confederation, "Eidgenossenschaft", harks back to the legendary comrades of the oath.

== See also ==
- Schwurhand – oath gesture in traditional depictions of the Rütlischwur
