= Walter Fürst =

Swiss patriot (fl. 1303–1317)

Walter Fürst (fl. 1303–1317) was a legendary Swiss patriot from Uri, who contributed to establish the liberty and independence of Switzerland. According to Tschudi he represented Uri at the Rütlischwur.

== See also ==
- Werner Stauffacher
- Arnold von Melchtal
