= A feather in your cap =

English idiomatic phrase

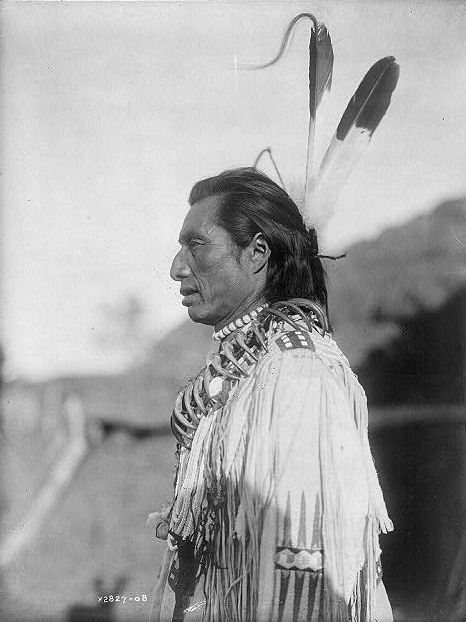
Crow's Heart; a Mandan medicine man

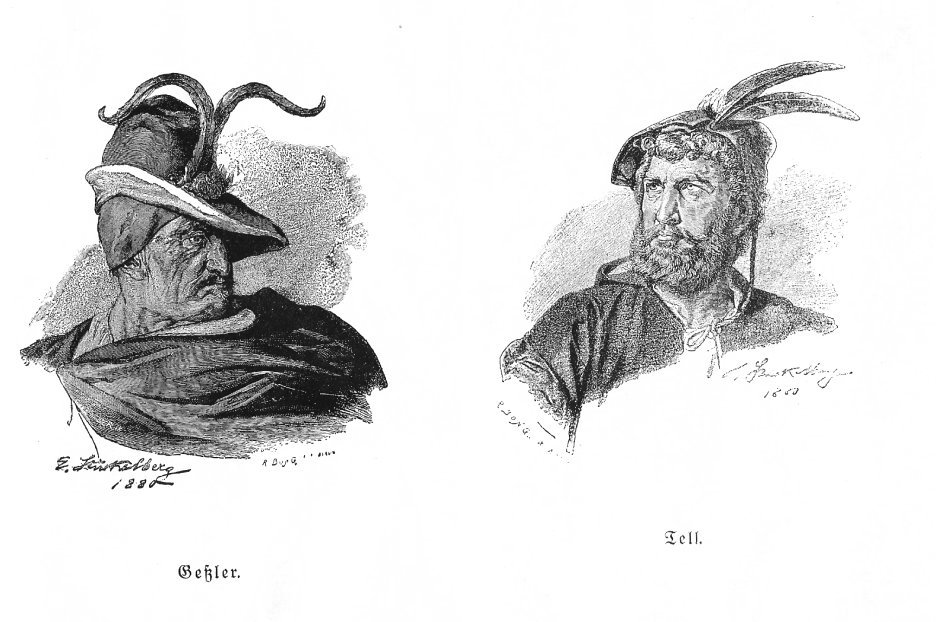
Gessler and Tell – complete with feathers in their caps

The term a feather in your cap is an English idiomatic phrase believed to have derived from the general custom in some cultures of a warrior adding a new feather to their headgear for every enemy slain. Or in other cases from the custom of establishing the success of a hunter as being the first to bag a game bird by plucking off the feathers of that prey and placing them in the hat band. The phrase today has altered to a more peaceful allusion, where it is used to refer to any laudable success or achievement by an individual that may help that person in the future.

== Traditions involving feathers in headdress ==
Examples of the use of feathers related to the killing of enemy combatants can be found in the traditional cultures of the Meunitarris of Alberta; and the Mandan people (present-day North and South Dakota), both of whom wore feathers in their headdress: and also the Caufirs of Cabul who are said to have stuck a feather in their turban for every enemy slain.

Similar customs are thought to have been practiced by the Mongols, Incas; Caciques; Abyssinians; Tur’comans; Hungarians; Dayak people; and the ancient Lycians.

Examples of the use of feathers related to hunting can be found in the cultures of highland peoples in Scotland and Wales where it is still customary for the hunter who kills the first woodcock to pluck out a feather and stick it in his cap. Other examples of feathers in caps which appear to be related to hunters and warriors can be found in mythological stories of historical figures such as the Austrian bailiff of Altdorf, Albrecht Gessler an aggressor who made Swiss national hero William Tell shoot an apple from the head of his son. Indeed, the Tyrolean hat of today, worn in the Austrian Alps has a cord wrapped around the base of the crown and a feather or brush on the side as trim.

Another theory for the modern term's origin ties into the expansion of the American frontier. At the time, the toughest man in each settlement would be referred to as the "town bully" (with noted examples including Ken McElroy and Jack Armstrong, the one-time wrestling opponent of Abraham Lincoln). Supposedly, town bullies would delineate themselves by wearing a red feather in their hat, acting as an invitation for challengers.

== See also ==
- Victory marking
- War bonnet
- White feather
- Teardrop tattoo
