= The Oath on the Grütli =

Painting by Henry Fuseli

The Oath on the Rütli
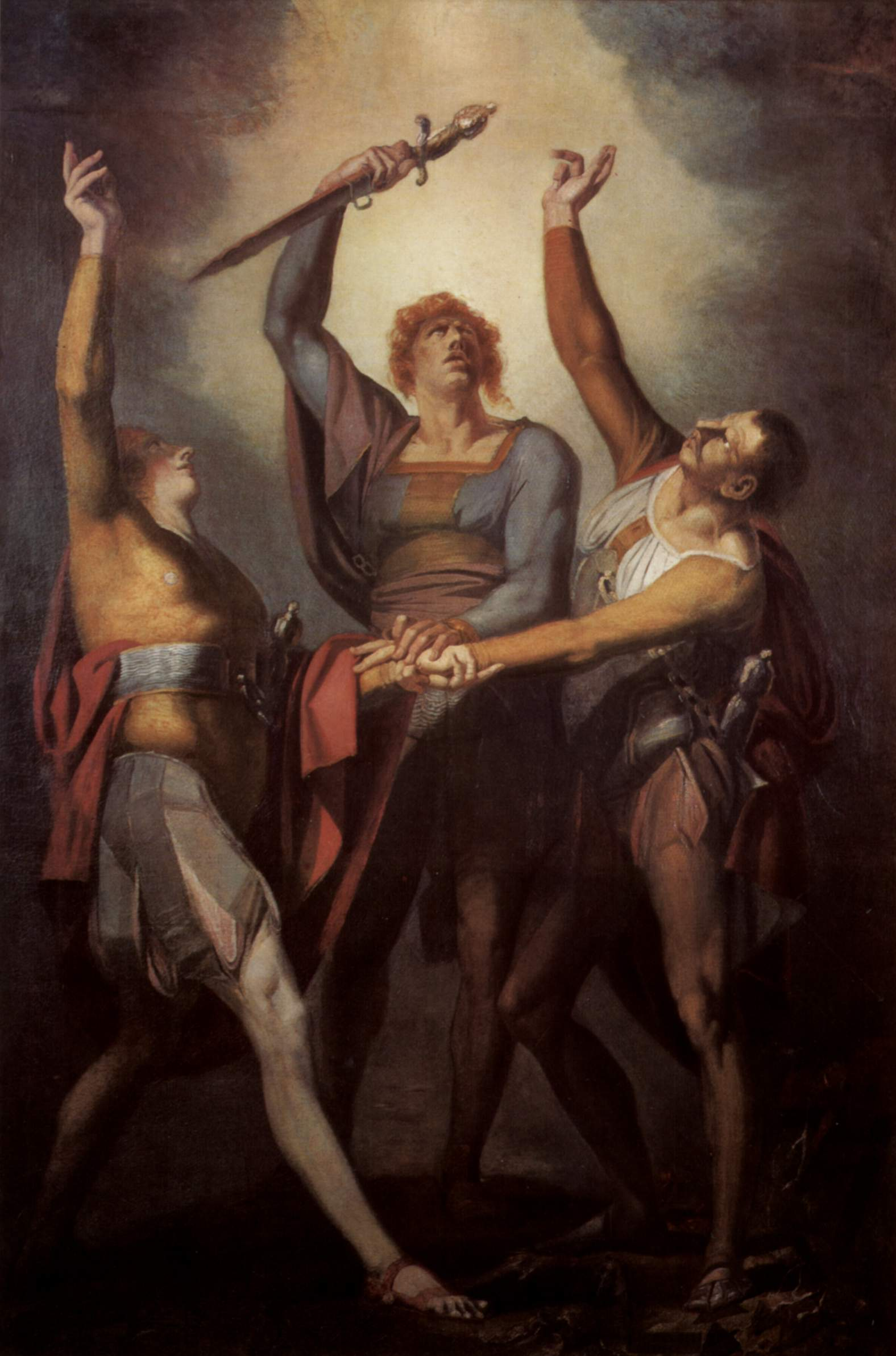
- Artist: Henry Fuseli
- Year: 1779–1781
- Medium: Oil on canvas
- Dimensions: 267 cm × 178 cm (105 in × 70 in)
- Location: Kunsthaus Zürich; Zürich

The Oath on the Rütli, also known as The Oath of the Three Confederates on the Rütli, is an oil on canvas painting by the Swiss artist Henry Fuseli, created in 1779–1781. It was commissioned by the city of Zürich, and is now held in the Kunsthaus Zürich. There are also several sketches and studies preserved in various museums around the world.

== Description ==
This canvas is a history painting that illustrates the moment of the Rütli oath, where the delegates of the Swiss cantons of Uri, Schwyz and Unterwalden swear to free themselves from the domination of the Habsburgs, on the Grütli or Rütli meadow, in 1307, creating the Old Swiss Confederacy. The three men are represented with their hands in the center, one above the other, while they look towards the sky raising the other arm. The three characters wear armor and the figure in the center is brandishing a sword. Behind them a ray of light illuminates the cloudy sky.

The figures are seen from below and appear elongated, while at the top in the center a supernatural light emerges from the clouds. Fuseli had made a trip to Italy in that period, where he was able to study the works of the mannerists, in particular the works of Parmigianino, Pontormo and Rosso Fiorentino. The work differs from the artistic canons of the late Baroque art, which were the basis for Neoclassical art, then nascent. Fuseli did not outline precise contours for the figures, he used brushstrokes wide and left the background fairly vague. The work is often compared with another famous work of that time, the Oath of the Horatii (1784), by French painter Jacques-Louis David, as both paintings depict an oath taken by three warriors. However, if the Davidian canvas belongs to the neoclassical style, the work of the Swiss artist is closer to a style that seeks the sublime.
