= Swiss National Day =

National holiday of Switzerland

- Flag of Switzerland
- Official name: German: Bundesfeiertag; French: Fête nationale Italian: Festa nazionale Romansh: Festa naziunala svizra
- Also called: First of August
- Observed by: Switzerland
- Significance: Anniversary of the Federal Charter of 1291
- Date: 1 August
- Next time: 1 August 2026
- Frequency: annual

Swiss National Day (German: Schweizer Bundesfeiertag; French: Fête nationale suisse; Italian: Festa nazionale svizzera; Romansh: Festa naziunala svizra) is the national holiday of Switzerland, set on 1 August. Although the founding of the Swiss Confederacy was first celebrated on this date in 1891 and annually since 1899, it has only been an official holiday since 1994.

== History ==
The date is inspired by the date of the Federal Charter of 1291, Pacte du Grütli, placed in "early August", when "three Alpine cantons swore the oath of confederation" (Schwyz, Uri and Unterwalden), an action which later came to be regarded as the founding of Switzerland." The document is one of several dozen pacts attested for the territory of Switzerland in the period of the mid-13th to mid-14th century. The foundation of the Old Swiss Confederacy had been mostly associated with the Bund of Brunnen of 1315, or with the Rütlischwur, dated to 1307 by Aegidius Tschudi. The Federal Charter of 1291 first assumed great importance in a report by the Federal Department of Home Affairs of 21 November 1889, suggesting a celebration in Bern in 1891 that would combine the city's 700th anniversary with the Confederacy's 600th anniversary. The date of the Federal Charter came to replace the formerly more prominent, traditional date of 8 November Rütlischwur, 1307 in popular consciousness in the 20th century, specifically after the 650th anniversary celebrations of 1941.

It has been an official holiday since 1994, following the acceptance of a federal popular initiative in its favour in 1993.

1 August is celebrated each year with paper lantern parades, bonfires, hanging strings of Swiss flags, and fireworks.

== Town-specific celebrations ==
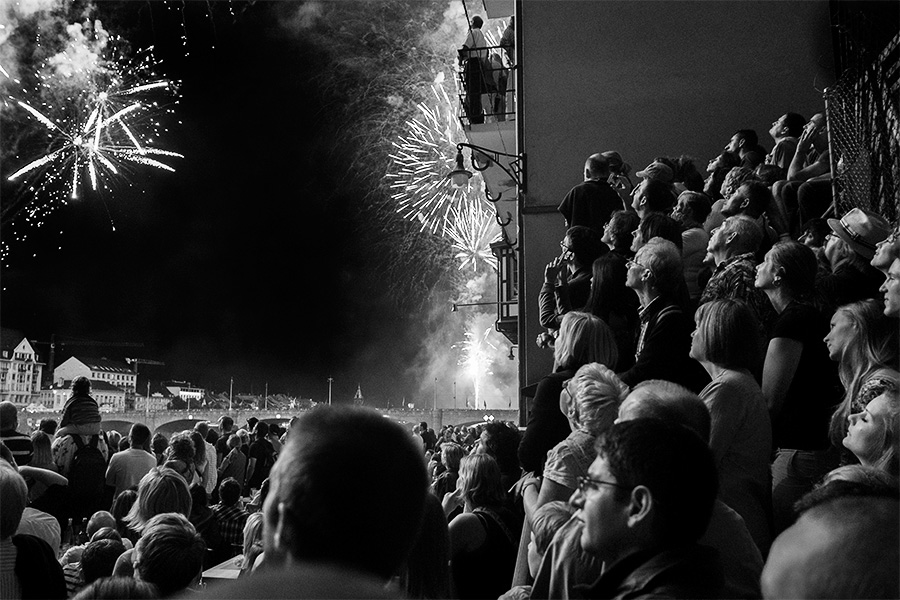
Fireworks in Basel

The day of independence is typically celebrated at a local municipality level, though certain events draw nationwide attention such as:

- In Schaffhausen, the 25-metre-high (82 ft) Rhine Falls waterfall has been regularly lit for the national holiday since 1920 and since 1966 is now lit only for this holiday.
- In Rütli Meadow above Lake Lucerne, a representational celebration is staged in the location where the legendary pledge of alliance, the Rütlischwur is said to have taken place.
- In Basel there are fireworks at the Rhine on the evening of 31 July.
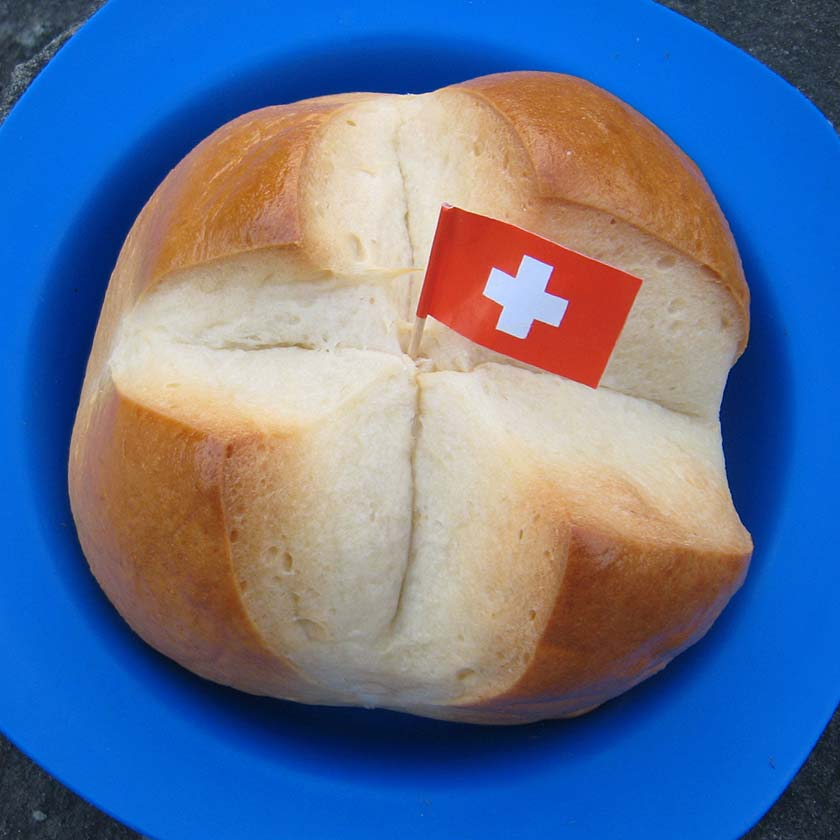
"1. Augustweggen", bread baked to celebrate Swiss National Day

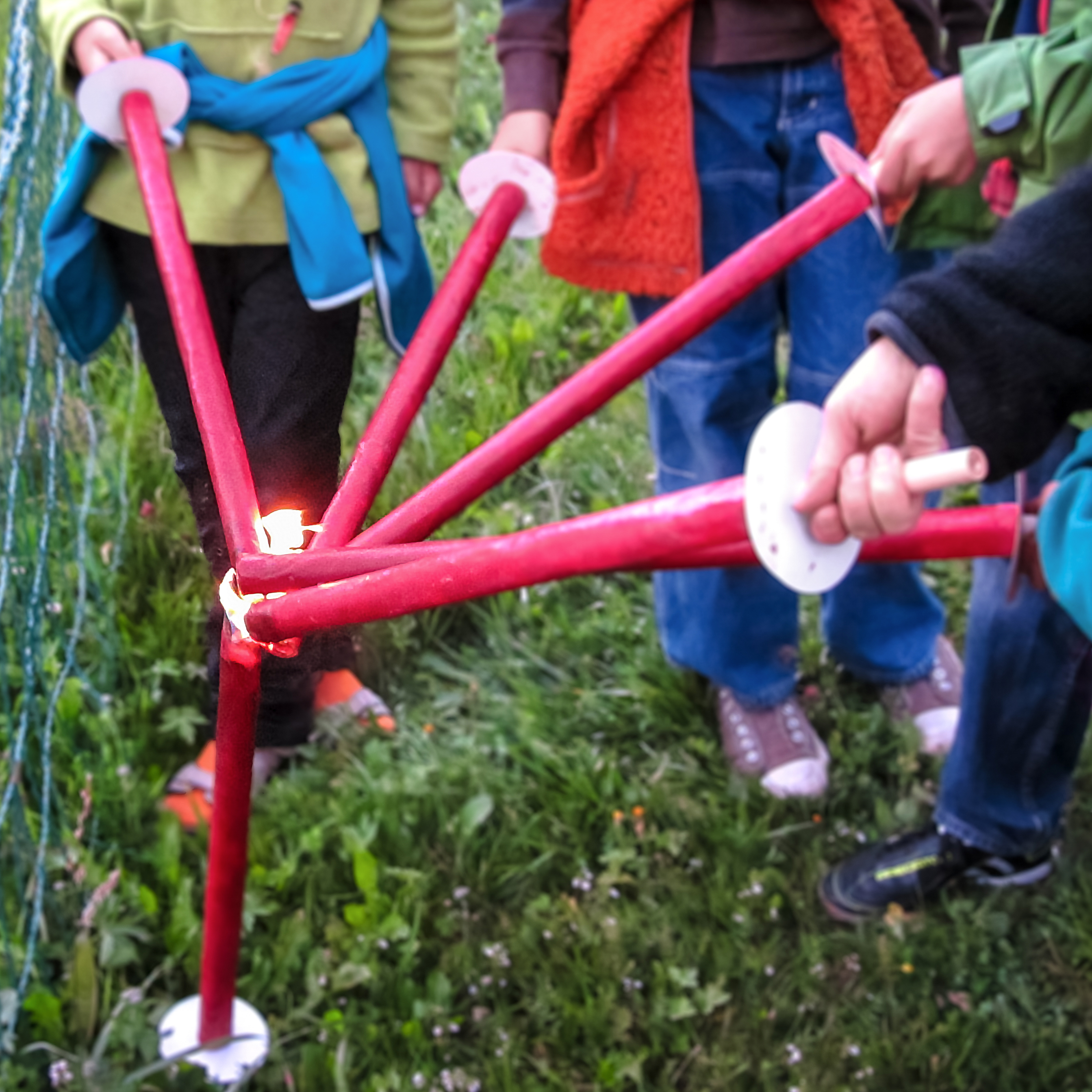
Lighting candlesticks for Swiss National Day

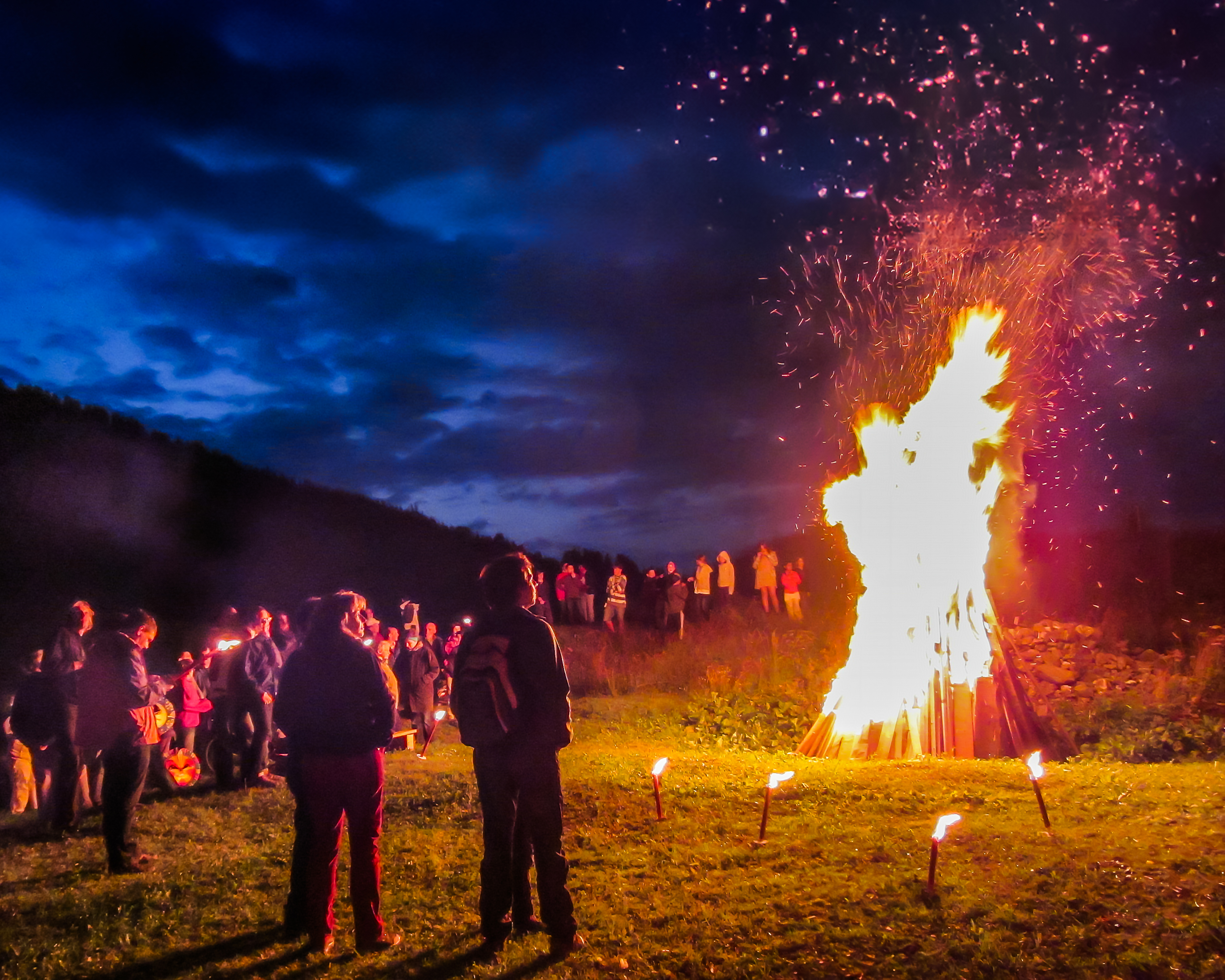
Bonfire in Tenna for Swiss National Day

== Celebrations around the world ==
Until 2013, the largest Swiss National Day event in the USA was organized and held annually by the Swiss Benevolent Society of New York. Usually held in Manhattan, the event draws thousands of Swiss, Swiss-Americans and Friends of Switzerland from around New York, New Jersey, Connecticut and Pennsylvania. The event was held at the group's former hospice in Mount Kisco, New York during the 1970s.

Since 2014, the event format has changed with the motto Back to the roots. It is a great family event again where one can enjoy everything ranging from Swiss sausages to raclette, Swiss wine, bands, a DJ and kids' corner. Since 2014, the event has been organized by the Swiss Society of New York, the Swiss Benevolent Society of New York and the Consulate General of Switzerland in New York.

Celebrations are also held in Washington, District of Columbia by the Swiss Club of Washington, D.C., on the Swiss Embassy grounds, in Monterey County, California at the Swiss Rifle Club, at the Newark Swiss Park in the San Francisco Bay Area and in the Los Angeles suburb of Whittier in Swiss Park. The Swiss Park celebration features Swiss cultural events and games, including a crossbow competition.

In Britain it is also Yorkshire Day, celebrating the county of Yorkshire. Bettys and Taylors of Harrogate, founded in 1919 by a Swiss baker, celebrate both of these days in its 6 cafe-tearooms across Yorkshire. For the National celebration, Swiss societies across the UK celebrate typically two Saturdays before the actual 1 August date to allow an opportunity for Swiss families based in the UK to attend prior to the long August summer break. In London Swiss National Day is held in Richmond, organised by the Swiss National Day London Committee, an independent group of volunteers, with the support of the Swiss Embassy London and Swiss clubs New Helvetic Society and Unione Ticinese.

Mont Sutton Quebec hosts one of the largest Swiss National Day celebrations outside Switzerland. Each year, it features one canton, with food and products from that canton.

In Uruguay, particularly in the town of Nueva Helvecia, which was founded in the 1860s by a group composed largely of Swiss immigrants, the Fiestas Suizas are held annually during the month of August, beginning on the eve of 1 August, Switzerland’s National Day. The celebrations include bonfires, exhibitions of traditional dances, block parties featuring Swiss cuisine, and musical events. On several occasions, the President of the Republic has attended the festivities as a guest.
