= Hans Marr =

German actor

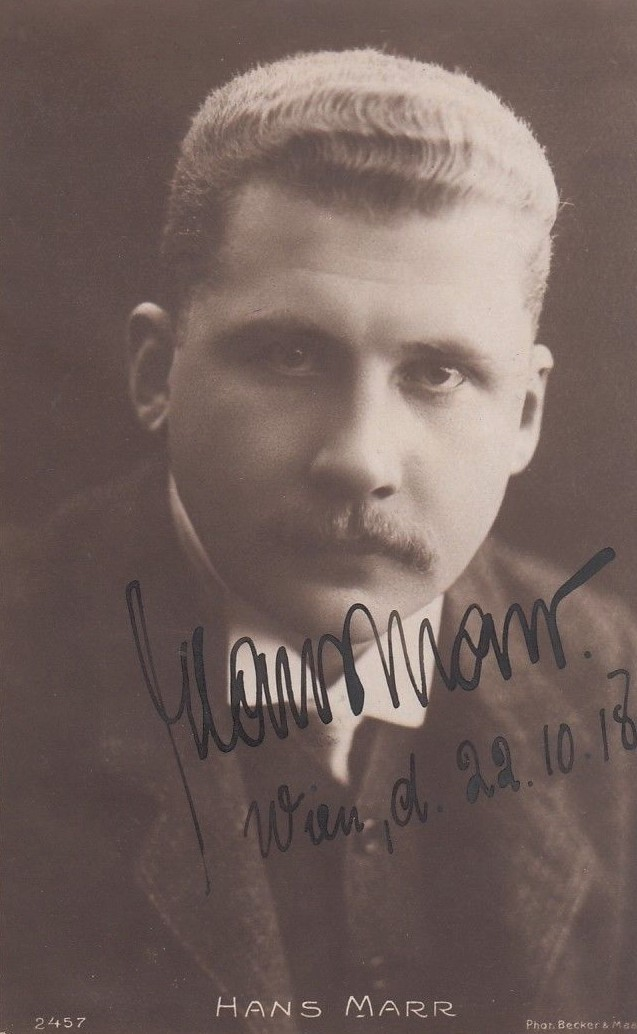
- Marr in 1918
- Born: Johann Julius Richter; 22 July 1878; Breslau, Silesia, Germany
- Died: 31 March 1949 (aged 70); Vienna, Austria
- Other names: Hanns Marr
- Occupation: Actor
- Years active: 1913-1949

Hans Marr (born Johann Julius Richter; 22 July 1878 – 21 March 1949) was a German actor.

== Selected filmography ==
- The Black Hand (1917)
- The Wandering Image (1920)
- The Adventure of Doctor Kircheisen (1920)
- Steuermann Holk (1920)
- To the Ladies' Paradise (1922)
- William Tell (1923)
- Paradise in the Snow (1923)
- Felicitas Grolandin (1923)
- The Moon of Israel (1924)
- The Arsonists of Europe (1926)
- Grandstand for General Staff (1926)
- The White Paradise (1929)
- Seafaring Is Necessary (1921)
- Grand Duchess Alexandra (1933)
- Der Musikant von Eisenstadt (1934)
- William Tell (1934)
- Nocturne (1934)
- The Immortal Song (1934)

== Bibliography ==
- Jung, Uli & Schatzberg, Walter. Beyond Caligari: The Films of Robert Wiene. Berghahn Books, 1999.
