= Tschudi =

Tschudi (variants: Schudy, Shoudy, Shudi, Schudi, Tschudy) is a surname common in the Canton of Glarus, Switzerland.

== History ==
The Tschudi name can be traced back to 870. After Glarus joined the Swiss Confederation in 1352, various members of the family held high political offices at home and held distinguished positions abroad, including as royal guards.

Several branches of the Tschudi family and their servants' families, who took on their masters' last name, first began emigrating to the United States in the mid-18th century (1700s), where the name Tschudi had its spelling changed to Judah, Judy, Juday, Judey, and also Shoudy and Study. All are still in use.

== People ==
- Aegidius Tschudi (1505–1572), Swiss statesman and historian
- Burkat Shudi (1702–1773), English harpsichord maker
- Clara Tschudi (1856–1945), Norwegian writer
- Gilles Tschudi (born 1957), actor
- Hans-Peter Tschudi (1913–2002), Swiss politician
- Johann Jakob von Tschudi (1818–1889), Swiss naturalist, explorer and diplomat
- Lill Tschudi (1911–2004), Swiss artist
- Otto Tschudi (born 1949), Norwegian alpine skier
- Ralph Tschudi (1890–1975), Norwegian sailor
- Stephan Tschudi-Madsen (1923–2007), Norwegian art historian

== Other uses ==
- The Tschudi Group, a Norwegian shipping company
