= William Tell Overturning the Barque of Gessler =

Painting by François-André Vincent

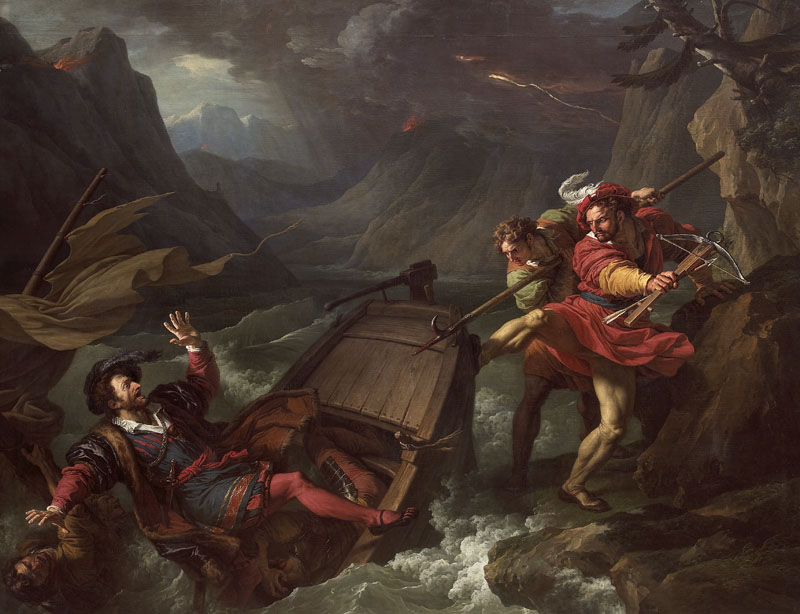
- Artist: François-André Vincent
- Year: 1795
- Type: Oil on canvas, history painting
- Dimensions: 325.5 cm × 423.5 cm (128.1 in × 166.7 in)
- Location: Musée des Augustins; Toulouse

William Tell Overturning the Barque of Gessler (French: Guillaume Tell renversant la barque sur laquelle le gouverneur Gessler traversait le lac de Lucerne) is a 1795 history painting by the French artist François-André Vincent. It is based on the legendary story of William Tell and his role in the rebellion against Hapsburg rule that founded the Swiss Confederation in the 14th century. It depicts the moment that Tell, a prisoner of the tyrannical governor Albrecht Gessler overturns the barque transporting him across Lake Lucerne and makes his escape.

Drew inspiration from the 1766 play Guillaume Tell by Antoine-Marin Lemierre, which has enjoyed a revival of popularity following the French Revolution. Vincent began the painting in 1791 but it had a delayed production process. It was originally a commission by the French revolutionary government, but the first delay occurred when he was assigned an important administrative role in establishing a new central museum of art.

During the period after the Revolution Vincent's rivalry with Jacques-Louis David who during the Reign of Terror wielded immense power over the French art world, reached a peak. While David represented the hardline Jacobins, Vincent was associated with the moderate Girondins. His own sister Suzanne was imprisoned and guillotined for alleged royalism. Vincent's wife Adélaïde Labille-Guiard had a painting publicly burned. Vincent's close friend and colleague Joseph-Benoît Suvée was also imprisoned but ultimately survived. The pressure on Vincent only lessened after the Fall of Maximilien Robespierre in July 1794, which led to a similar loss of power for David.

It was then that Vincent returned to the William Tell subject. It is striking for its use of Romanticism rather than the Neoclassicism Vincent had previously been associated with and was advocated by David. The painting was displayed at the Salon of 1795 held at the Louvre in Paris. Today it is in the collection of the Musée des Augustins in Toulouse, having been acquired in 2004.

== Bibliography ==
- Freund, Amy. Portraiture and Politics in Revolutionary France. Penn State University Press, 2014.
- Halliday, Anthony. Facing the Public: Portraiture in the Aftermath of the French Revolution. Manchester University Press, 2000
- Mansfield, Elizabeth C. The Perfect Foil: François-André Vincent and the Revolution in French Painting. University of Minnesota Press, 2011.
