= The Adventure of Doctor Kircheisen =

1921 film

- Directed by: Rudolf Biebrach
- Written by: Paul Frank (novel); Leo Perutz (novel); Robert Wiene
- Produced by: Paul Ebner; Maxim Galitzenstein
- Starring: Lotte Neumann; Hermann Thimig; Hans Marr
- Production company: Maxim Film
- Distributed by: Hansa Film
- Release date: 23 September 1921
- Country: Germany
- Languages: Silent; German intertitles

The Adventure of Doctor Kircheisen (German: Das Abenteuer des Dr. Kircheisen) is a 1921 German silent drama film directed by Rudolf Biebrach and stars Lotte Neumann, Hermann Thimig and Hans Marr. The script was by Robert Wiene, based on the novel Das Mangobaumwunder by Paul Frank and Leo Perutz.

It premièred at the Union-Theater Nollendorfplatz and at the U-T Kurfürstendamm (Filmbühne Wien) on 23 September 1921.

== Cast ==
- Lotte Neumann
- Hermann Thimig
- Hans Marr
- Albert Kunze
- Mabel May-Yong
- Leopold von Ledebur

== Bibliography ==
- Jung, Uli; Schatzberg, Walter (1999). Beyond Caligari: The Films of Robert Wiene. Berghahn Books. ISBN 978-1-57181-156-1.
