= Konrad Baumgarten =

Hero of the Swiss liberation

Konrad Baumgarten or Conrad von Baumgarten is a hero of the Swiss liberation legend and, according to Friedrich Schiller's play William Tell, oath-taker at the famous Rütli-oath of 1 August 1291 forming the Old Swiss Confederacy. There, Baumgarten was acting in his function as one of the representatives of Unterwalden, together with the somewhat younger Arnold von Melchthal. Baumgarten was a free and wealthy man who had killed, in his own residence, the local Habsburg sheriff Wolfenschiessen with an axe in defence of his wife Itta Baumgarten against the sheriff's trespass and inappropriate attempts to approach her. With the assistance of William Tell, Baumgarten managed to escape from the sheriff's warriors and to flee to Werner Stauffacher on the other side of Lake Lucerne.
