= Frieda Gallati =

- Born: 12 September 1876; Glarus
- Died: 30 December 1955 (aged 79); Ibid
- Occupation: Historian

Academic background
- Education: University of Zurich

Frieda Gallati (September 12, 1876, Glarus, Switzerland — December 30, 1955, Glarus, Switzerland) was a Swiss historian.

== Biography ==
Frieda Gallati was born into a family of a lawyer Rudolf Gallati. Graduated from secondary school in Zurich. Starting in 1896, she studied at the University of Zurich, where she received her doctorate in history in 1902; she was the second Swiss woman to do so. In 1907, she married professor Wilhelm Melchior, from whom she divorced again in 1915.

Gallati was a specialist in the field of Swiss foreign policy during the Thirty Years' War. She is considered the most important connoisseur of Aegidius Tschudi.
