= Arnold von Melchtal =

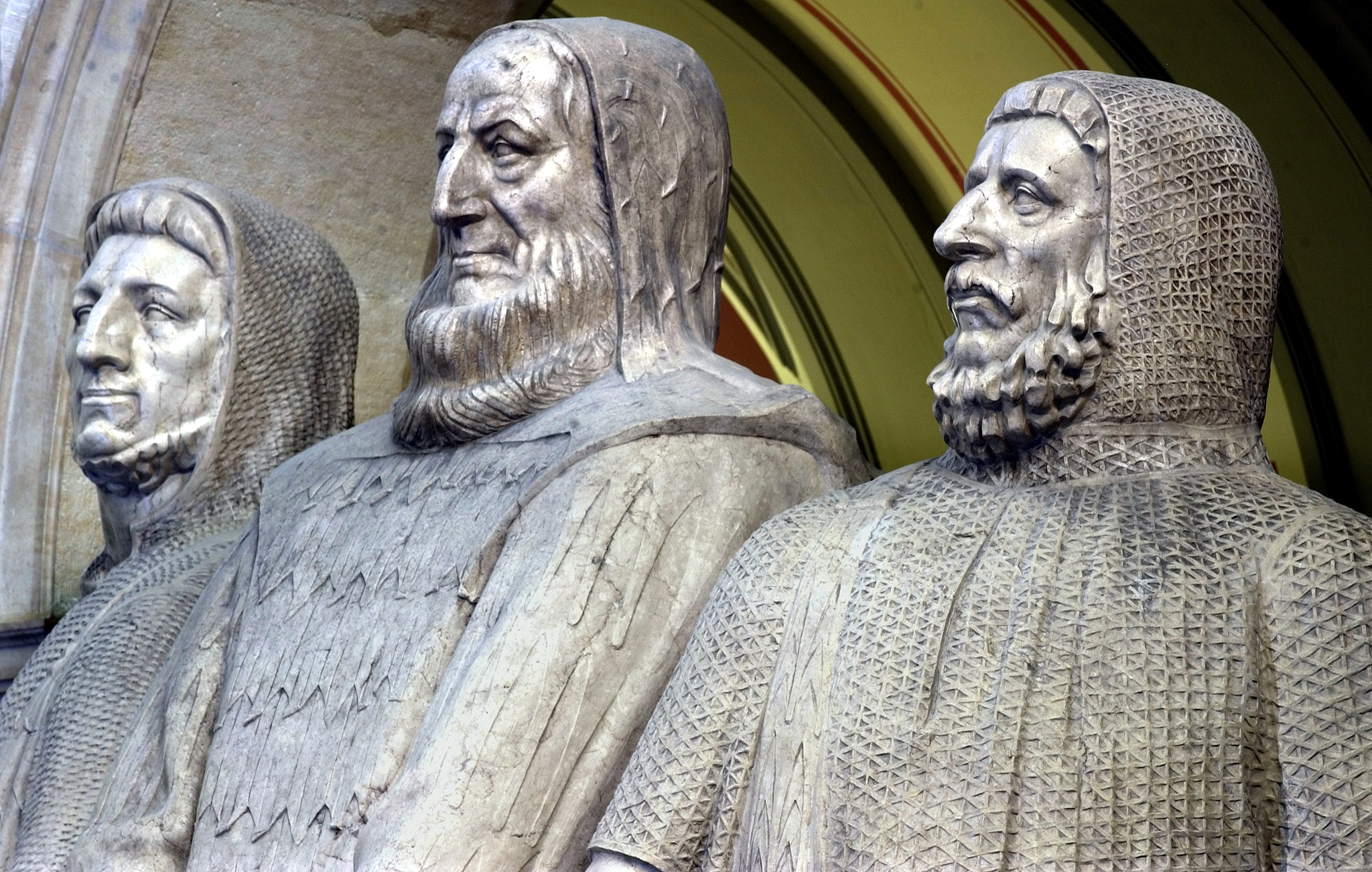
Statue of the three eidgenossen (Werner Stauffacher, Walter Fürst, Arnold von Melchtal), by James Vibert (1914)

Arnold von Melchtal, also spelt Melchthal and otherwise Arnold von der Halden, was one of the three Eidgenossen, the legendary founding fathers of Switzerland. He represented the Canton of Unterwalden at the Rütlischwur.

Aegidius Tschudi in his Chronicon Helveticum tells Arnold's story as follows:

At the beginning of the 14th century, Landenberger was Vogt of Obwalden for Habsburg. He was known for his cruelty, and enjoyed tormenting his subordinates with cruel jests. One day, the Vogt Landenberger decided that Heinrich von Melchtal should forfeit his yoke of oxen, since he hadn't paid his taxes on time. He sent out armed men to confiscate the oxen. When they arrived at the home of Heinrich von Melchtal, he and his son Arnold were right then plowing the meager fields they had. Heinrich tried to plead with the minions of the Vogt, arguing that he would need the oxen to plow, and if the oxen were indeed to be confiscated, he surely could not pay the taxes and would probably starve.

To this he was answered: "If you need to plow, you can have your son pull the plow". Enraged by this, Arnold von Melchtal grabbed the stick he used to guide the oxen and beat the minion over his hands, breaking him his fingers. Of course, after that he had to flee the dominion of Vogt Landenberger and found refuge with Walter Fürst in Uri. The Vogt took cruel revenge on the poor old father of Arnold, having him tortured and blinded, and confiscating all his property.

This case, among other similar events, gave the people of Uri, Schwyz and Underwalden ample reasons to form a pact against their cruel overlords. This pact was the Rütlischwur which in the end led to the overthrow of the foreign magistrates, and the independence of Switzerland.
