= White Book of Sarnen =

Swiss collection of medieval manuscripts

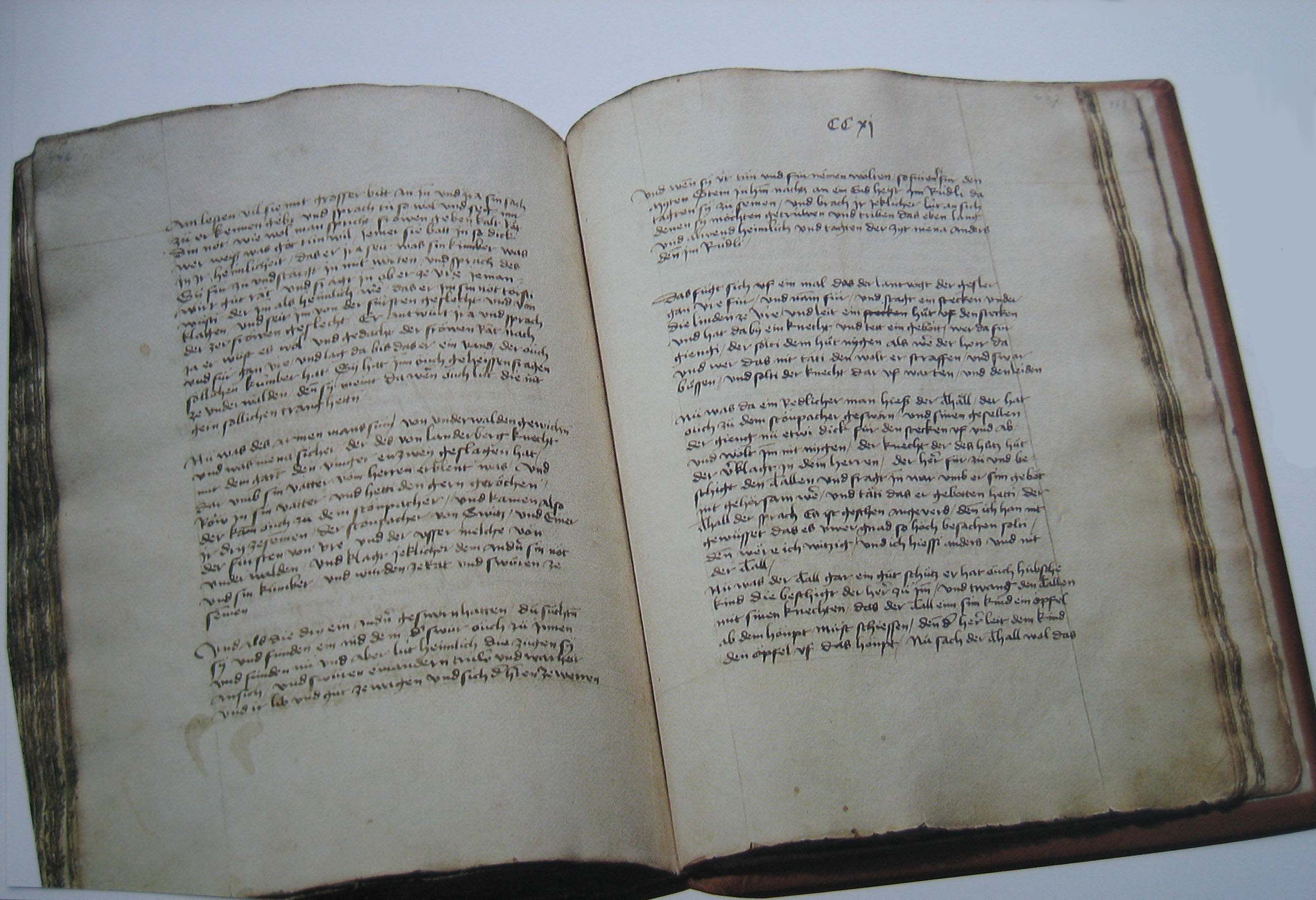
White Book of Sarnen

The White Book of Sarnen (German: Weisses Buch von Sarnen) is a collection of medieval manuscripts compiled in the late 15th century by Hans Schriber, state secretary (Landschreiber) in the Swiss Confederation canton Obwalden. This volume, 258 pages in length, was given its name because of the white parchment in which it is bound. The White Book of Sarnen contains the earliest surviving reference to the Swiss national hero William Tell.

== Composition and structure ==
The White Book of Sarnen was composed in 1474 by a country scribe called Hans Schriber. Schriber’s book consists of two parts. The longer first part contains seventy-seven different documents that Schriber copied from original documents stored in the archives of Sarnen. To this documentary section, Schriber added a brief report on the early history of the Old Swiss Confederacy. This second part, 25 pages in length, makes mention of the Rütli oath (German: Rütlischwur), the Burgenbruch, and William Tell’s heroic deeds.

== Influence ==
Although the White Book of Sarnen contains the earliest of any surviving William Tell tales, it did not contribute much to the popularity of the William Tell legend, as only a small number of people, such as the two chroniclers Petermann Etterlin and Aegidius Tschudi, had access to this document.

The only surviving copy of the White Book of Sarnen, which was long believed to be lost, was accidentally discovered in 1856. However, researchers disagree on whether the White Book of Sarnen, which is preserved in the public record office of the canton of Obwalden, is merely a copy of an older manuscript written around 1426.
