= William Tell (play) =

1804 play written by Friedrich Schiller

- Original title: Wilhelm Tell
- Original language: German
- Written by: Friedrich Schiller

Premiere
- Date: March 17, 1804
- Place: Weimar
- Directed by: Johann Wolfgang Goethe

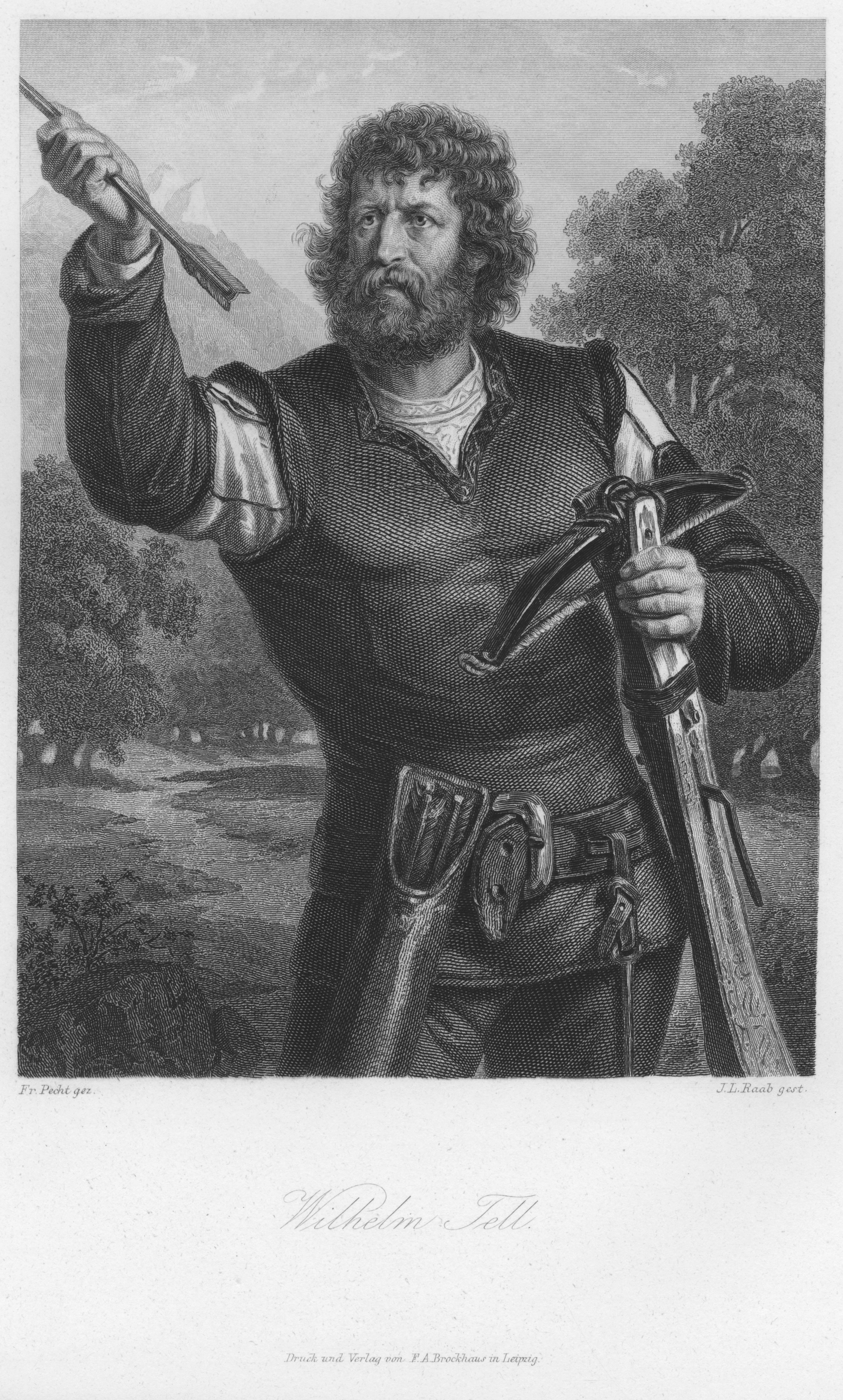
William Tell; from the Schiller Galerie; by Johann Leonhard Raab

William Tell (German: Wilhelm Tell, German pronunciation: [ˈvɪlhɛlm ˈtɛl]) is a drama written by the German playwright and philosopher Friedrich Schiller in 1804. The story focuses on the legendary Swiss marksman William Tell as part of the greater Swiss struggle for independence from the Habsburg Empire in the early 14th century. Gioachino Rossini's four-act opera Guillaume Tell was written to a French adaptation of Schiller's play.

== Composition ==
The play was written by Friedrich Schiller between 1803 and 1804, and published that year in a first edition of 7000 copies. Since its publication, Schiller’s William Tell has been translated into many languages.

Friedrich Schiller (who had never been to Switzerland, but was well informed, being a historian) was inspired to write a play about the legendary Swiss marksman William Tell by his wife Lotte, who knew the country from her personal experience. After his friend, Johann Wolfgang Goethe, had returned from his second journey to the Lake of Lucerne in 1779, Schiller started collecting sources.

Most of Schiller’s information about the history of the Swiss Confederation is drawn from Aegidius Tschudi’s Chronicon Helveticum (Latin: ‘Swiss Chronicle’), Johannes von Müller’s History of the Swiss Confederation (German: Geschichten Schweizerischer Eidgenossenschaft), as well as two chronicles of Petermann Etterlin and Johannes Stumpf.

== Synopsis ==
The fateful enmity of the tyrant Gessler, Governor of the Swiss cantons, and William Tell, an obscure huntsman, begins during a tempest on Lake Lucerne when Tell braves the angry waves to row to safety a peasant who is pursued by the Governor's horsemen. "The lake may take pity on him; but the Governor, never," says Tell.

His opinion of the bloodthirsty Gessler is shared increasingly by the peasantry as the oppressor fills the old jails, builds a huge new prison at Altdorf for more victims, and sets his cap upon a pole before it, commanding that all who pass must bow to it or pay the penalty of death. Public anger is fanned into rebellion when Gessler blinds an aged man for a trifling misdemeanor. Tell, the individualist, holds aloof from the rebels' councils, but promises his aid when needed.

A friend of the peasants is the aged Baron of Attinghausen, but his nephew and heir, Ulrich of Rudenz, fascinated by the splendor of Gessler's court and love for Bertha, the Governor's ward, is allied with the tyrant. The Baron warns Ulrich that Bertha is being used only to bait him, and that the freedom-loving people will prevail in the end, but the youth goes to join Gessler. While they are together hunting, however, Bertha reveals that she will love him only if he joins in the fight to liberate his own people from Gessler's grip.

Tell prepares to pay a promised visit to his father-in-law, a leader of the rebellion, and his beautiful wife, fearful that the Governor counts him as an fearful enemy, asks him in vain to postpone the trip to later. Tell insists that he has nothing to fear, and sets off with his crossbow, accompanied by Walter, his son. They pass the prison where Tell, failing to salute the Governor's cap, is seized by a guardsman. Several peasants are trying to rescue him when the Governor's hunting party rides up and Gessler demands an explanation from the huntsman. Tell declares his failure to salute was an oversight, and the Governor remarks that he has heard that Tell is a master of the bow. Walter boasts: "Yes, my lord! My father can hit an apple at a hundred yards!" Says Gessler: "Very well, you shall prove your skill now. Shoot an apple from the boy's head. If you miss, your own head shall pay the forfeit."

The spectators are horrified. Tell falls upon his knees, imploring Gessler to withdraw so barbarous a command. He bares his own breast, but the Governor laughs and says: "It is not your life I want, but the shot—the proof of your skill." The boy speaks up: "Shoot, Father! Don't be afraid. I promise to stand still." Tell removes two arrows from his quiver, puts one in his belt, takes aim and sends the other on its way. The boy remains standing. Walter runs to his father, crying: "Here's the apple, Father! I knew you'd never hit me!"

Tell falls upon his knees to embrace his son, but Gessler has not finished with him. "A word with you, Tell," he commands. "I saw you place a second arrow on your belt ... what was the object?" Tell answers: "If the first arrow had struck my child, the second would have gone through your heart."

For this answer, Gessler orders him bound and taken to the prison at Küssnacht for his threat; but a great storm comes up which proves to be the huntsman's salvation. Since he alone can take the boat through the gale, his guards release his bonds and Tell steers to a shelving ledge, leaps out, and with his foot thrusts his captors' boat back into the waves. Now, he tells a fisherman, he is planning "a deed that will be in everybody's mouth!"

Meanwhile, Bertha has been borne off by Gessler's men. Ulrich, who earlier had condemned his master for Tell's ordeal and had declared that to keep silent longer would be treason to his country and his King, has gone over wholly to the side of his people. But he returns too late to find the old Baron of Attinghausen alive; his uncle has died with this injunction to the peasants: "The day of the nobles is passing. The new day of the people is at hand ... the flower of chivalry is cut down, but freedom waves her conquering flag on high.... Hold fast together, men—hold forever fast.... Be one—be one—be one----"

Ulrich rallies the peasants and is acclaimed their leader. He directs that they arm and wait for a fiery signal on the mountain tops, then swoop down upon the tyrant. A more ominous figure in the revolt, however, is hidden upon the brow of a hill overlooking a road. Tell, with his crossbow ready in his hand, awaits Gessler, who is expected to enter the pass below. Gessler soon appears with his retinue. His way is barred by Armgart, a peasant woman, and her seven children. She cries to the Governor: "Mercy, my lord! Pardon!... Pardon!... My husband lies in prison. My children cry for bread. Pity, my lord, have pity on me!"

Gessler shouts: "Step aside or, by Heaven, I'll ride you down!" Armgart throws herself and her children before the horses, crying out: "Very well, then ride us down." Gessler shouts: "I've been too mild a ruler to these people. From now on, I must change. I will proclaim a new law throughout the land. I will----"

The sentence is never finished; an arrow pierces his body. Clutching his breast, Gessler cries: "It is William Tell's work!... O Lord, have mercy on my soul!" Armgart rejoices: "Dead, dead! He reels, he falls!... Look, children! This is how a tyrant dies!"

The shaft that killed Gessler ignites the signal fires of revolution, and at daybreak peasants and workingmen are tearing down the prisons. In one they find Bertha; they rescue her just as burning timbers are about to fall on her. The liberated peasants, with Ulrich and Bertha among them, now throng Tell's home with the cry: "Long live William Tell, our shield and saviour!" Bertha, greeting the commoners as comrades, asks to be accepted into their League of Freedom. Her request is granted and she gives her hand to Ulrich. He proclaims: "And from this moment all my serfs are free!"

But soon word comes that Albert, the Emperor of Austria, has been assassinated by his own nephew John. One day, Tell's wife receives a visitor at their cottage; the visitor is dressed as a monk, but Tell soon recognizes him as John in disguise, fleeing his would-be captors. John, knowing that Tell has killed Gessler, expects approving words from the archer, who, instead, denounces John's crime. Nevertheless, Tell helps John flee, on the condition that John expiate his crime as soon as possible.

== Performance history and influence ==
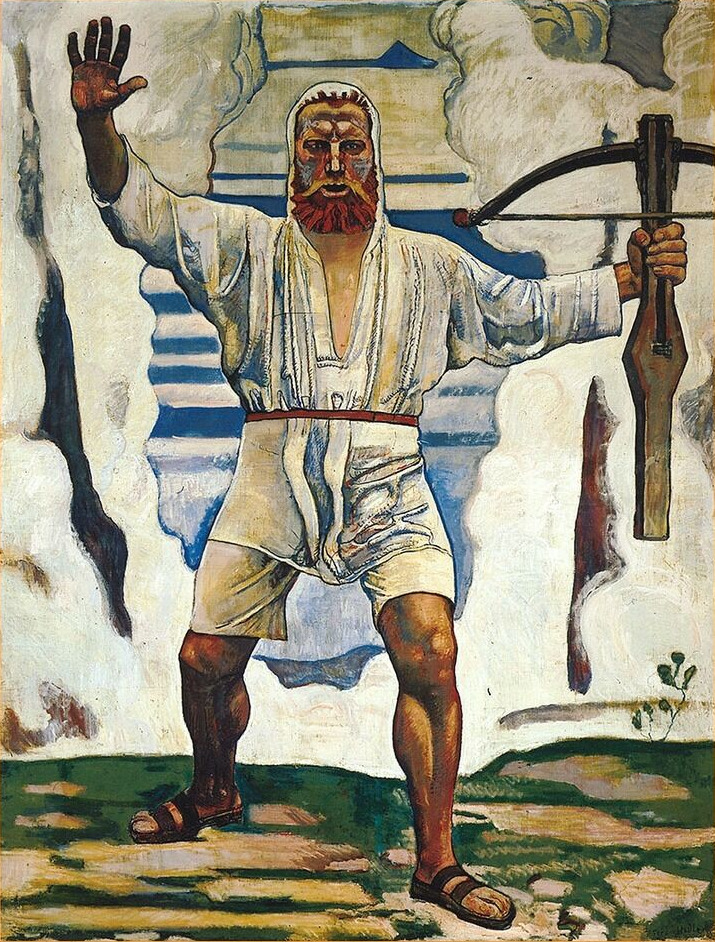
Wilhelm Tell by Ferdinand Hodler (1897)

The first public performance of Schiller’s Wilhelm Tell was staged in Weimar under the direction of Johann Wolfgang Goethe on 17 March 1804. In the summers of 1912 to 1914 and again between 1931 and 1939, Schiller's play was staged in Interlaken. It was filmed in both German and English versions in 1934, both versions starring the same leading actors (Conrad Veidt was Gessler). Since 1947 the play has been performed annually in Interlaken at the Tellspiele. In 2004 Schiller’s play was staged for the first time at the Rütli Meadow (German: Rütliwiese), on the occasion of its 200th anniversary. Since 1938 it has also been performed every Labor Day weekend in New Glarus, Wisconsin in English, and until recently also in German.

The characters of the play are used in the national deck of cards of Hungary and Austria and are known as Tell pattern cards. The deck was born around 1835 in the times before the Hungarian Revolution of 1848, when revolutionary movements were awakening all over in Europe. The Aces show the four seasons. These cards spread across the Austro-Hungarian Empire and are still the most common German-suited playing cards in that part of the world today. Characters portrayed on the Obers and Unters include: Hermann Geszler, Walter Fürst, Rudolf Harras and William Tell.

It was long believed that the card was invented in Vienna at the Card Painting Workshop of Ferdinand Piatnik, however in 1974 the very first deck was found in an English private collection, and it has shown the name of the inventor and creator of deck as József Schneider, a Master Card Painter at Pest, and the date of its creation as 1837. Had he not chosen the Swiss characters of Schiller's play, had he chosen Hungarian heroes or freedom fighters, his deck of cards would never have made it into distribution, due to the heavy censorship by the government at the time. Although the characters on the cards are Swiss, these cards are unknown in Switzerland.

Jose Rizal, the famous Philippine revolutionary nationalist and author, translated the drama into his native Tagalog in 1886, having drawn much of his literary and political inspiration from Schiller and his works. During the 19th century, William Tell inspired many freedom fighters, e.g. in Italy and the Russian Empire.

Although Schiller’s play was frequently staged during the Nazi regime, it was banned from public performance in 1941. Adolf Hitler, who had only narrowly escaped an assassination attempt by the young Swiss Maurice Bavaud (who was later dubbed the “New William Tell” by Rolf Hochhuth), is reported to have publicly announced his regret that Friedrich Schiller had immortalized the Swiss sniper William Tell (“Ausgerechnet Schiller musste diesen Schweizer Heckenschützen verherrlichen” – "Of all people Schiller had to glorify this Swiss sniper").

== Film adaptations ==
The play has been the subject of various film adaptations, notably a French film, William Tell (1903 film), a German-Swiss historical film, William Tell (1934 film), an Italian film William Tell (1949 film), and the English-language version William Tell (2024 film).

== See also ==
- A feather in your cap
- Alouette (song)
- The Continental Players
