= Rütli =

Meadow on Lake Lucerne, Switzerland

Coordinates: 46.969°N 8.593°E

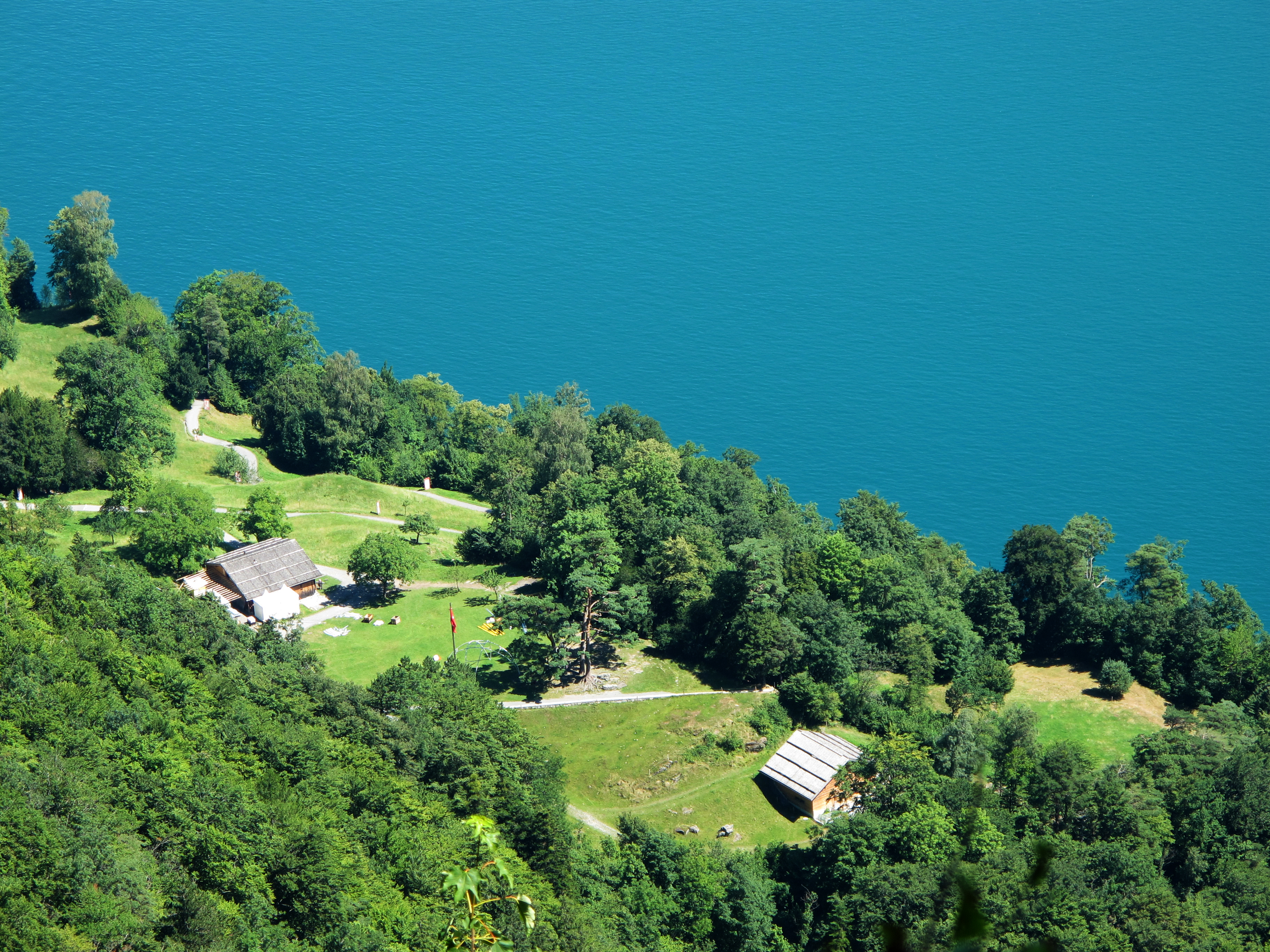
The Rütli meadow

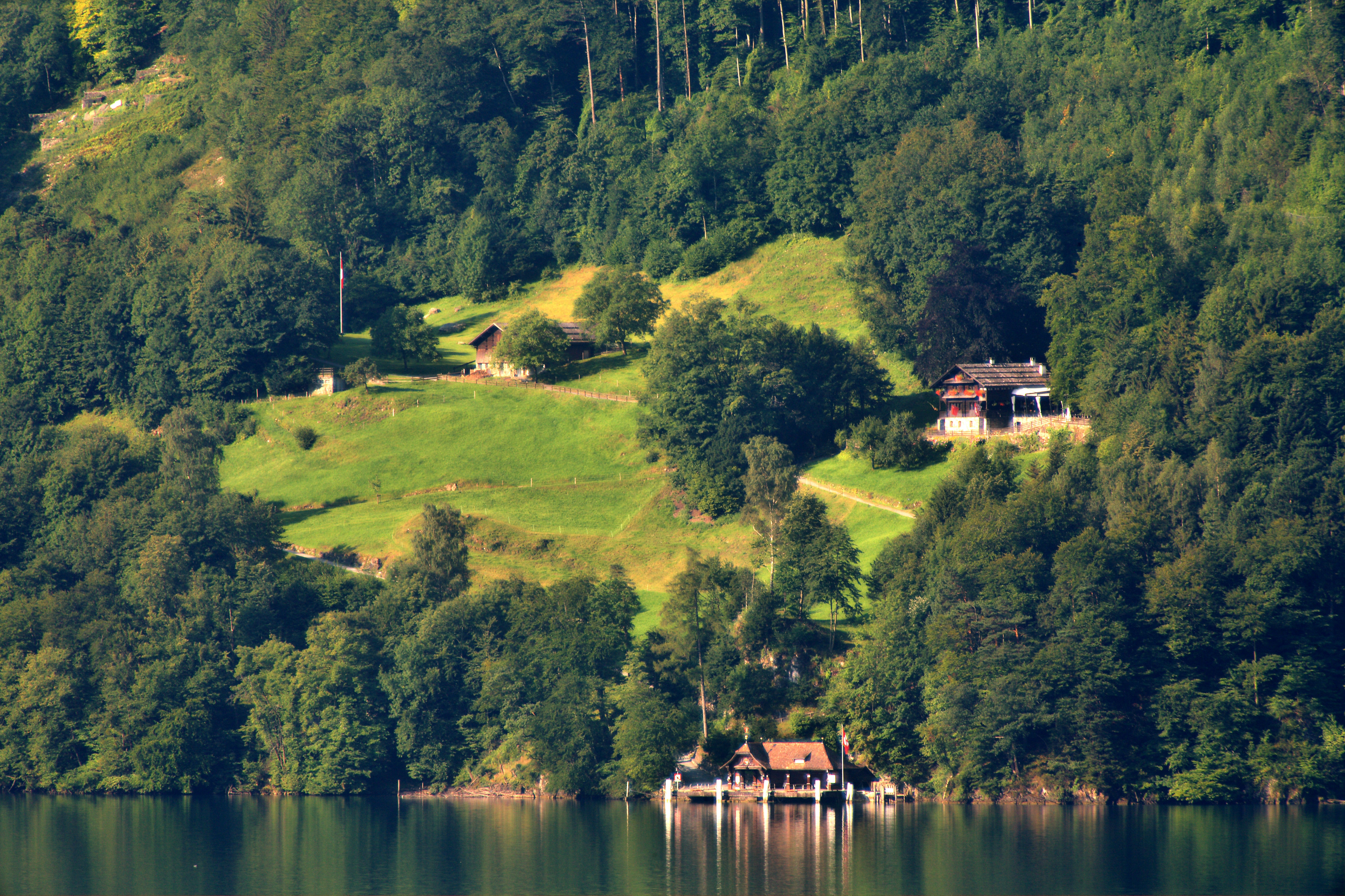
The Rütli as seen from across Lake Uri

Rütli (German pronunciation: [ˈryːtli]) or Grütli (French: [ɡʁytli]; Italian: [ˈɡrutli]) is a mountain meadow on Lake Lucerne, in the Seelisberg municipality of the Swiss canton of Uri. It is the site of the Rütlischwur in traditional Swiss historiography, the oath marking the foundation of the original Swiss Confederacy. As such it is treated as a national monument of Switzerland. Since 1860, the Schweizerische Gemeinnützige Gesellschaft (SGG) has organized a celebration at the site on Swiss National Day (August 1), since 1994 recognized as a public holiday. Rütli is only accessible by boat from Lake Lucerne or by foot from Seelisberg.

== History ==
Aerial view (1953)

The Rütli became a site of symbolic importance for Swiss national identity in the early 18th century, with incipient National Romanticism. In the 1780s, there were (unsuccessful) proposals to erect a monument to Liberty at the site. Under the Helvetic Republic, the Rütli became a site of pilgrimage for conservative dissidents. In 1804, the year after the dissolution of the Helvetic Republic, Friedrich Schiller published his Willam Tell, which dramatized the Rütli oath. A patriotic Rütlilied was written by Johann Krauer and Franz Joseph Greith in 1820.

In 1859, the Rütli meadow was bought by the Schweizerische Gemeinnützige Gesellschaft (SGG, "Swiss society for public utility, founded 1810) with the aim of preserving it as a site of national importance, among other reasons because there were plans to build a hotel at the site. The SGG turned ownership of the site over to the Confederacy under the condition of treating it as an unalienable national property and leaving its administration entrusted to the SGG.

On July 25, 1940, General Henri Guisan used the site for his speech, now remembered as the "Rütlirapport", to all commanding officers of the Swiss Armed Forces in which he outlined the Reduit strategy and his aim never to surrender if invaded (see Switzerland during the World Wars):

"I decided to reunite you in this historic place, the symbolic ground of our independence, to explain the urgency of the situation, and to speak of you as a soldier to soldiers. We are at a turning point of our history. The survival of Switzerland is at stake."

Since 1991, Rütli has also been the start of the Swiss Path hiking trail created to celebrate the 700th anniversary of Switzerland.

The National Day celebrations at the Rütli were disrupted by Neo-Nazis in 2005. In reaction to this, access to the celebration was subject to pre-registration the following year. In apparent connection to this controversy, an individual caused a detonation at the 2007 celebration. The "attacker" was dubbed "Rütli-Bomber" in the popular press and spent a year in custody and while being investigated by federal police. It turned out that the "bomb" consisted of legal fireworks buried in the meadow at a depth of 20 cm. The case was closed without charges being filed in 2011.

== Access ==
Until 1869, the site was only accessible by boat. A landing stage for steamers was built in that year, and the next year the steamer 'Rütli' started its service. At the time, not all were satisfied with the development, a newspaper in Lucerne lamented the loss of the patriotic boat ride with a traditional Nauen from Brunnen. In 1880, a part of the rockface was removed at the shore of the lake to build a port and in 1884, the site was included in the timetable of the Navigation Company of Lake Lucerne which serviced the site once a day. The port was expanded in 1913 and the landing of private boats was initially prohibited as the view that access should only be possible through public transport should be possible was defended. In 2000, the landing stage was enlarged to a capacity of three to four motorboats at the same time.

Besides the access from the lake, Rütli is also accessible through a hiking trail from Seelisberg built in 1872/1873.

== See also ==
- Rütlischwur
- Federal Charter of 1291
- Swiss patriotism
