= Albrecht Gessler =

Legendary 14th century Habsburg bailiff

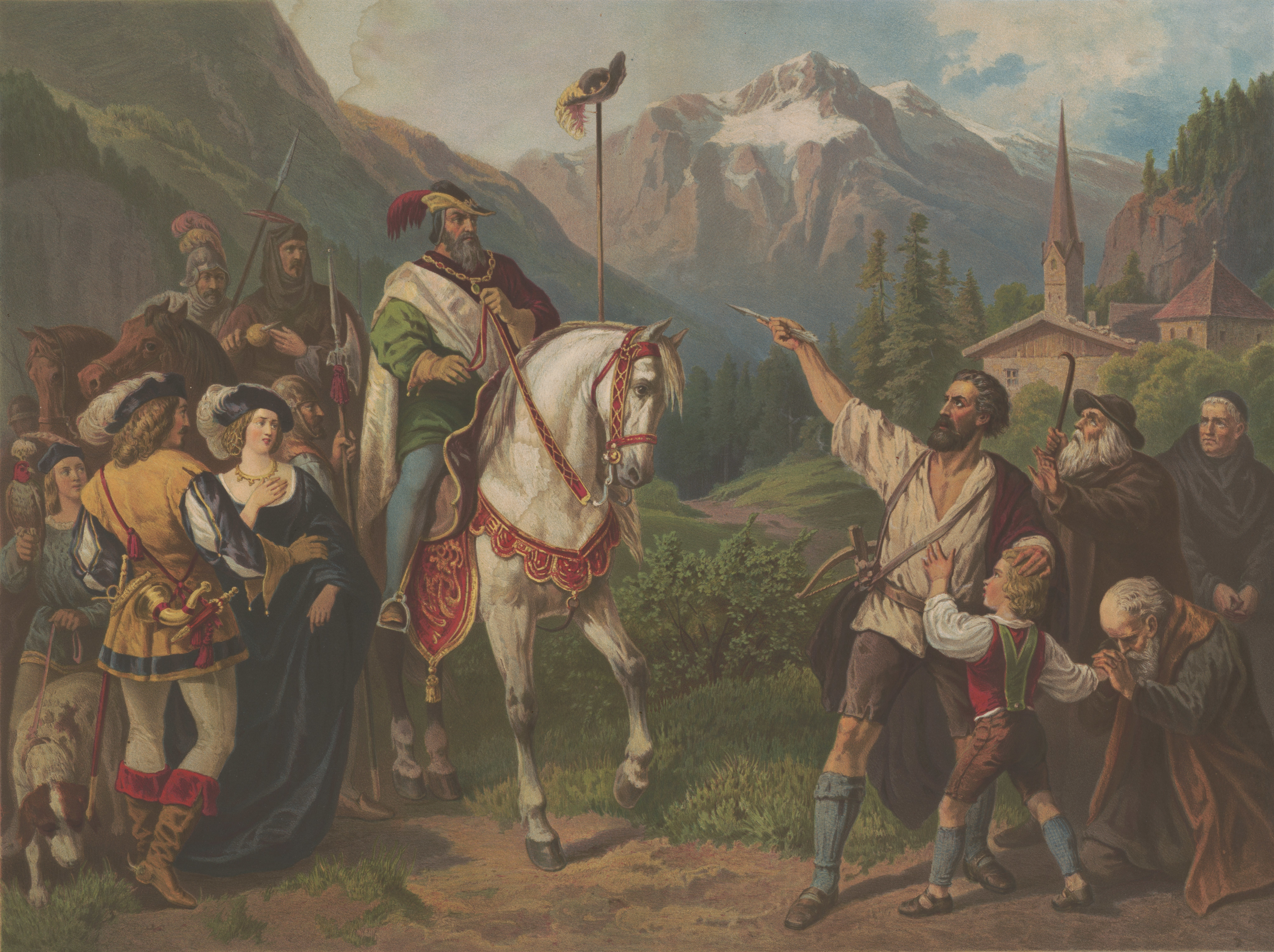
Swiss folk hero William Tell shows Gessler the bolt he meant to kill him with.

Albrecht Gessler, also known as Hermann, was a legendary 14th-century Habsburg bailiff (German: Landvogt) at Altdorf, whose brutal rule led to the William Tell rebellion and the eventual independence of the Old Swiss Confederacy.

== Legend ==
According to the Chronicon Helveticum by Aegidius Tschudi (1505–1572), in 1307 Gessler raised a pole in the market square of Altdorf, Uri, Switzerland, placed his hat atop it, and ordered all the townsfolk to bow before it. Tell, whose marksmanship and pride were legendary, publicly refused. Gessler's cruel wrath was tempered by his curiosity to test Tell's skill, so he gave Tell the option of either being executed or shooting an apple off his son's head in one try. Tell succeeded in splitting the apple with his arrow, saving his own life. When Gessler asked why he had readied two crossbow bolts, he lied and replied that it was out of habit. After being assured that he would not be killed, Tell finally admitted that the second was intended for the tyrant if his son was harmed.

Gessler, enraged, had Tell arrested and taken by boat across Lake Lucerne to Küssnacht to spend the life he had saved in a dungeon. A sudden fierce storm made the crew terrified and, since William Tell was a better sailor, they handed the wheel to him but, instead of heading towards the dungeon, he escaped to shore. There he ambushed and killed Gessler with an arrow, launching the young Confederacy's rebellion against Austrian rule.

== Historical account ==
The coat of arms of the Gessler family.

A Gessler family of ministeriales is documented from the 13th century onwards but at Wiggwil in the Aargau region, the original homeland of the Habsburgs and the basis for their rise after the extinction of the Swabian House of Hohenstaufen. The Gesslers profited from the election of Count Rudolph of Habsburg as King of the Romans in 1273 and his acquisition of the Austrian and Styrian duchies after the victory over King Ottokar II of Bohemia at the 1278 Battle on the Marchfeld.

The White Book of Sarnen, written around 1470, mentioned one gesler who was vogt at Uri and Schwyz. In the late 14th century one Hermann Gessler ruled the domain of Grüningen (which today belongs to Zürich); the domain of Grüningen had been pawned to the Gessler family by the House of Habsburg. His stern measures against the peasant population made the name Gessler an epitome of tyranny.

No sources that predate the earliest references to the Tell legend of the late 15th century refer to a bailiff Gessler in central Switzerland, and it is presumed that no such person existed. Gessler's role in Tell's story is analogous to that of King Niðung in the story of Egil in the Þiðrekssaga.

== In Schiller's play ==
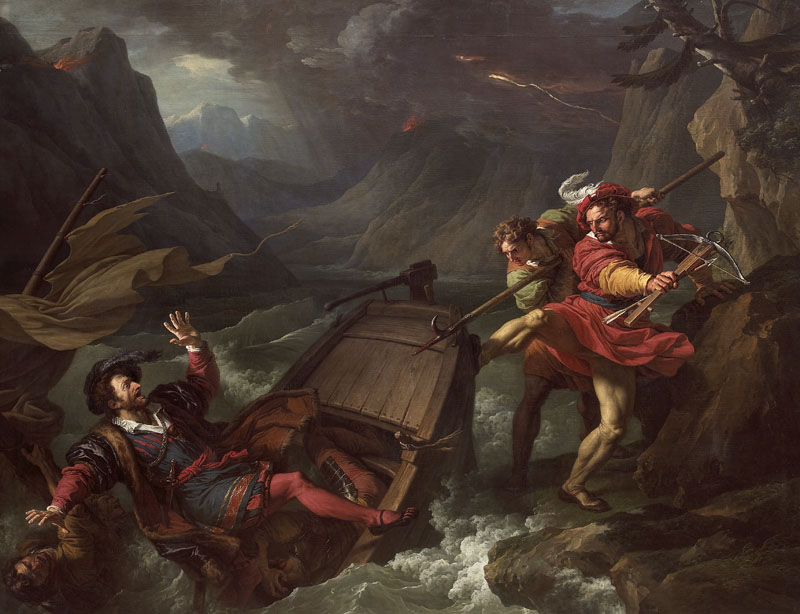
François-André Vincent, William Tell Overturning the Barque of Gessler, 1795

Friedrich Schiller perpetuated the figure in his 1804 drama Wilhelm Tell. In the Tale Spinners For Children recording of the story, Gessler is working under orders from the Emperor of Austria, who wishes to deliberately provoke the people of Switzerland into a rebellion which will serve as an excuse for Austria to invade Switzerland.
