= Chronicon Helveticum =

16th-century work of Swiss history

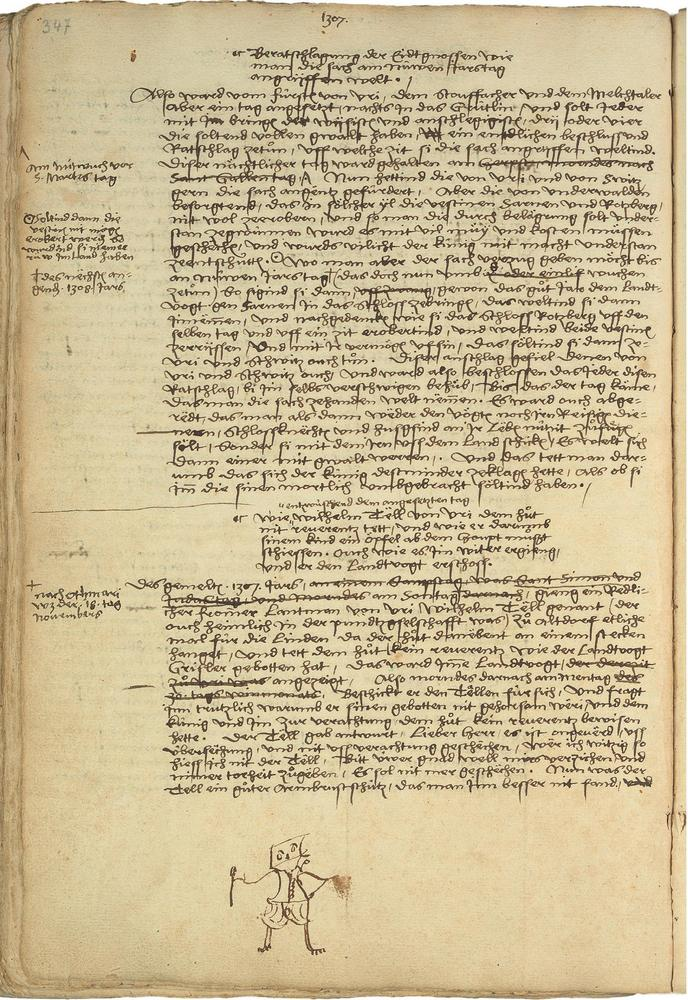
Original hand-written manuscript of the Chronicon Helveticum, c. 1555. In the lower half of the page, Tschudi begins an account of the apple shot in William Tell's story

The Chronicon Helveticum (Latin for "Swiss Chronicle") is one of the oldest accounts of the early history of the Swiss Confederation.

The rough draft of the Chronicon Helveticum was written by Swiss historian Aegidius Tschudi in 1550. Although Tschudi seems to have made the last revisions between 1569 and 1570, the monumental work did not appear in printed form until Johann Rudolf Iselin published a two-volume edition in 1734, giving it the name by which it is known today.

Tschudi's Chronicon Helveticum plays an important part in the historiography of Switzerland, since it contains copies of about 50 documents which have not survived in any other form. In terms of content, Tschudi is particularly interested in representing the long-established independence of the Swiss population. Furthermore, Tschudi makes mention of the struggle between empire and papacy, the crusades, and a large number of other issues concerning Swiss cities, dioceses and monasteries.

Furthermore, Tschudi's Chronicon Helveticum contains much valuable material for the study of the William Tell legend.

It is probably due to these circumstances that Tschudi's Chronicon Helveticum became a model for later writers dealing with William Tell. Not only did Tschudi's chronicle become the major source for Johannes von Müller’s History of the Swiss Confederation (German: Geschichten Schweizerischer Eidgenossenschaft), it also served as a model for Friedrich Schiller’s play William Tell.
