= Werner Stauffacher =

Swiss noble

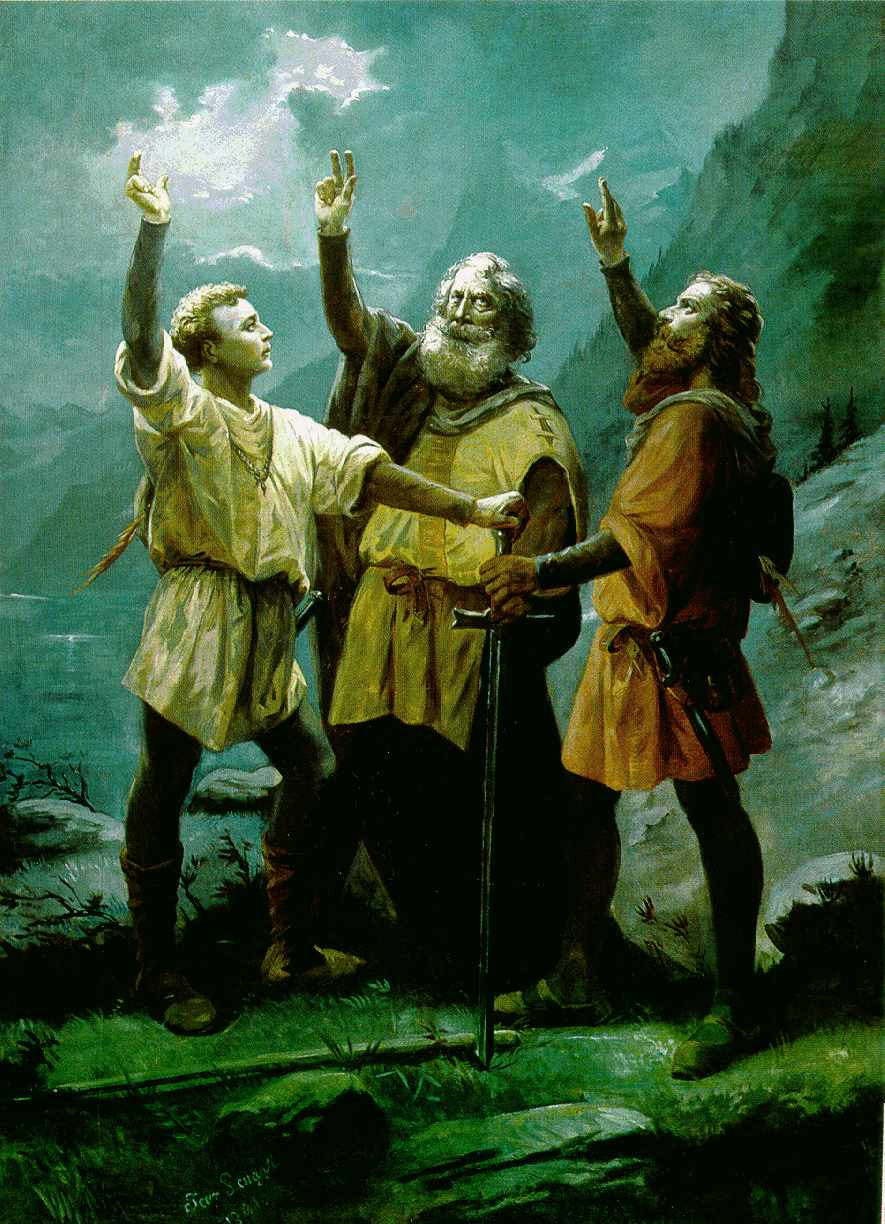
The Rütlischwur.

Werner Stauffacher was supposedly the name of the representative of the canton of Schwyz, one of the three founding cantons at the legendary Rütlischwur of 1291, as told by Aegidius Tschudi.

Many members of the Stauffacher family held the office of Landammann of Schwyz during the 13th and 14th century, most notably among them a certain Werner Stauffacher, leader of the Confederate troops at the Battle of Morgarten. According to legend, his wife was Gertrud Stauffacher.

In Zürich, a tram stop (Stauffacher), a street, a bridge and a quai are named for Stauffacher. In December 2003, the city renamed a square from "Stauffacherplatz" to Ernst-Nobs-Platz, as it was confused with the tram stop. In other Swiss towns, there are "Stauffacherstrasse" (Arbon, Bätterkinden, Bern, Emmenbrücke, Schaffhausen, St. Gallen), "Via Stauffacher" (Lugano), "Im Stauffacher" (Bennau) or a "Stauffacherweg" (Lucerne, Solothurn, Zuchwil).
