= Aegidius Tschudi =

Swiss historian

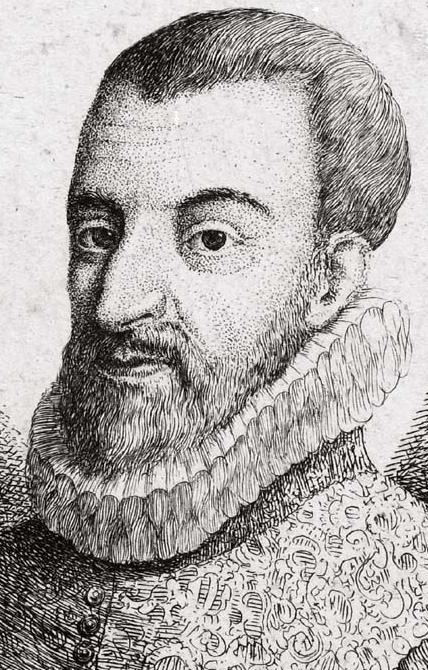
Aegidius Tschudi

Aegidius Tschudi (Glarus, 5 February 1505 – Glarus, 28 February 1572) was a Swiss historian, statesman and soldier, an eminent member of the Tschudi family of Glarus, Switzerland. His best-known work is the Chronicon Helveticum, a history of the early Swiss Confederation.

== Biography ==
Tschudi was born in Glarus on 5 February 1505 to Ludwig Tschudi the Elder, a Swiss mercenary in French service and veteran of the Swabian War, and Margaretha Kilchmatter. He studied at the Latin school of Glarus, where he had the future Protestant reformer Huldrych Zwingli, then the parish priest of Glarus, as his professor. Tschudi later attended a boarding school in Basel run by Heinrich Glarean, with whom he maintained a lifelong correspondence. He had brief stints as a mercenary in Northern Italy in 1523 and in Southern France in 1536.

Beginning his political career, Tschudi served as bailiff of Sargans from 1530 to 1532, of Rorschach (on behalf of the Prince-Abbot of St. Gall) from 1532 to 1533, and of the County of Baden from 1533 to 1535 and from 1549 to 1551, where he had his first contact with Roman antiquities on the site of Vindonissa. He played an increasingly important role in the canton of Glarus in the 1550s, as councillor, vice-landamman, and finally as chief magistrate or landamann from 1558 to 1560. As the Swiss representative at the 1559 Diet of Augsburg, Tschudi was ennobled by Ferdinand I, Holy Roman Emperor.

Originally inclined to moderation, Tschudi became later in life more and more devoted to the cause of the Counter-Reformation. It is, however, as the historian of the Swiss Confederation that he is best known. He collected material for three major works, which have never wholly lost their value, though his researches have been largely corrected. In 1538 his book on Rhaetia, written in 1528, was published in Latin and in German: De prisca ac vera Alpina Rhætia, or Die uralt warhafftig Alpisch Rhætia. In his later years, Tschudi became an advisor to the Abbot of Einsiedeln for the final sessions of the Council of Trento. He died in Glarus on 28 February 1572.

== Publications and influence ==
Tschudi's chief works were not published until long after his death. The Beschreibung Galliae Comatae appeared under Frieda Gallati's [erratum: Johan Jacob Gallati, 1715–1760; Frieda Gallati 1876-1955] editorship in 1758, and is mainly devoted to a topographical, historical and antiquarian description of ancient Helvetia and Rhaetia, the latter part being his early work on Rhaetia revised and greatly enlarged. This book was designed practically as an introduction to his magnum opus, the Chronicon Helveticum, part of which (from 1001 to 1470) was published by J. R. Iselin in two stately folios (1734–1736); the rest consists only of rough materials. There exist two rather antiquated biographies of Tschudi by I. Fuchs (2 vols, St Gall, 1805) and C. Vogel (Zürich, 1856).

Tschudi worked from both documents and legends to portray the ancient traditions of the Swiss defence of liberty, giving roles not only to William Tell but to the heroic moment of the foundation of the Confederacy, when Werner Stauffacher representing Schwyz, Walter Fürst of Uri and Arnold of Melchtal for Unterwalden meet at the Rutli, a meadow above Lake Lucerne, and take an oath to defend Swiss freedom. Tschudi's influential text dates that event to 8 November 1307.

== Criticism ==
Down to the latter part of the 19th century Swiss historical writers had largely based their works on his investigations and manuscripts. The historical reputation of Tschudi has suffered after later research. His statements and documents relating to Roman times and the early history of Glarus and his own family had long roused suspicion. Detailed examination has proved that he not merely claimed to have copied Roman inscriptions that had never existed, and amended others in an arbitrary fashion, but that he deliberately forged documents to push back the origin of his family to the 10th century. He thus also entirely misrepresented the early history of Glarus, which is that of a democratic community, and not (as he pretended) that of a preserve of several aristocratic families. Tschudi's historical credit is thus low, and no document printed or historical statement made by him can be accepted without careful verification and examination.

For a summary of these discoveries see Georg von Wyss in the Jahrbuch of the Historical Society of Glarus (1895), vol. xxx., in No. i (1894), of the Anzeiger f. schweizerische Geschichte, and in his Geschichte d. Historiographie in d. Schweiz (1895), pp. 196, 201, 202. The original articles by Vogelin (Roman inscriptions) appeared in vols xi., xiv. and xv. (1886–1890) of the Jahrbuch f. schweizer Geschichte, and that by Schulte (Glarus) in vol. xviii. (1893) of the same periodical. For the defence, see a weak pamphlet, Schulte u. Tschudi (Coire, 1898), by P. C. von Planta.

== See also ==
- Chronicon Helveticum
