= Chronicle of the City of Lucerne =

1482 chronological account of city

The Chronicle of the City of Lucerne (German: Luzerner Chronik) is the oldest existing chronological account of the history of the city of Lucerne.

== Composition ==
The Chronicle of the City of Lucerne was composed around 1482 by Melchior Russ from Lucerne. Russ’ chronicle, which is preceded by a translation of the preface of Albrecht Vonstetten’s description of the Burgundian Wars, is primarily based on Benedict Tschachtlan and Heinrich Dittlinger’s revised version of Conrad Justinger’s Bernese Chronicle (German: Chronik der Stadt Bern).

== Influence ==
Although Russ’ Chronicle of the City of Lucerne contains many mistakes and constitutes, for the most part, nothing more than an incoherent compilation of older writings such as the Song of the Founding of the Confederation (German: Lied von der Entstehung der Eidgenossenschaft) and Justinger’s Bernese Chronicle, it is of great value to the study of the William Tell legend.

While the Bernese Chronicle served Russ as a source for his illustration of the hardship the Swiss population had to endure under the reign of the Habsburg bailiffs, he used the Song of the Founding of the Confederation as the basis for his representation of a small fraction of the William Tell story.

Even if the influence of earlier William Tell texts on Russ’ book is undeniable, his chronicle, nevertheless, embellished the legend of William Tell with new details. Although the Chronicle of the City of Lucerne closely follows the wording of the Song of the Founding of the Confederation, these two sources differ remarkably in their endings. Whereas the Song of the Founding of the Confederation ends with the remark that William Tell was drowned on the order of Herman Gessler in the Lake of Lucerne, Russ’ chronicle concludes with an account of how William Tell managed to assassinate the Austrian governor in his boat.
