= William Tell =

Folk hero of Switzerland

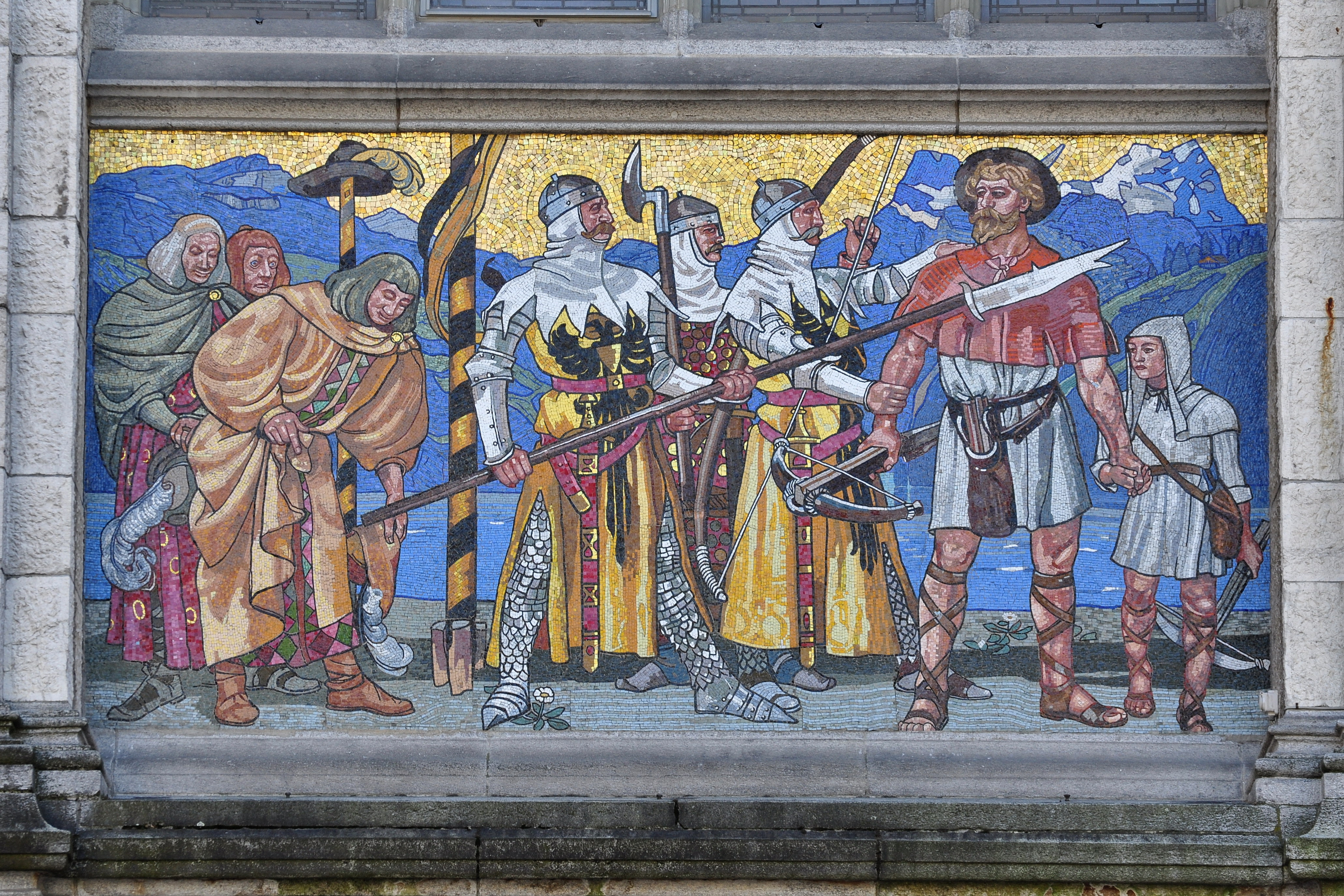
Tell is arrested for not saluting Gessler's hat (mosaic at the Swiss National Museum, Hans Sandreuter, 1901)

William Tell (German: Wilhelm Tell, pronounced [ˈvɪlhɛlm ˈtɛl]; French: Guillaume Tell; Italian: Guglielmo Tell(o); Romansh: Guglielm Tell) is a legendary folk hero of Switzerland. He is known for shooting an apple off his son's head.

According to the legend, Tell was an expert mountain climber and marksman with a crossbow who assassinated Albrecht Gessler, a tyrannical reeve of the Austrian dukes of the House of Habsburg positioned in Altdorf, in the canton of Uri. Tell's defiance and tyrannicide encouraged the population to open rebellion and to make a pact against the foreign rulers with neighbouring Schwyz and Unterwalden, marking the foundation of the Swiss Confederacy, of which Tell is consequently considered the father.

Set in the early 14th century (traditional date 1307, during the rule of Albert of Habsburg), the first written records of the legend date to the latter part of the 15th century, when the Swiss Confederacy was gaining military and political influence. Tell is a central figure in Swiss national historiography, along with Arnold von Winkelried, the hero of Sempach (1386). He was important as a symbol during the formative stage of modern Switzerland in the 19th century, known as the period of Restoration and Regeneration, as well as in the wider history of 18th- to 19th-century Europe as a symbol of resistance against aristocratic rule, especially in the Revolutions of 1848 against the House of Habsburg, which had ruled Austria for centuries.

== Legend ==
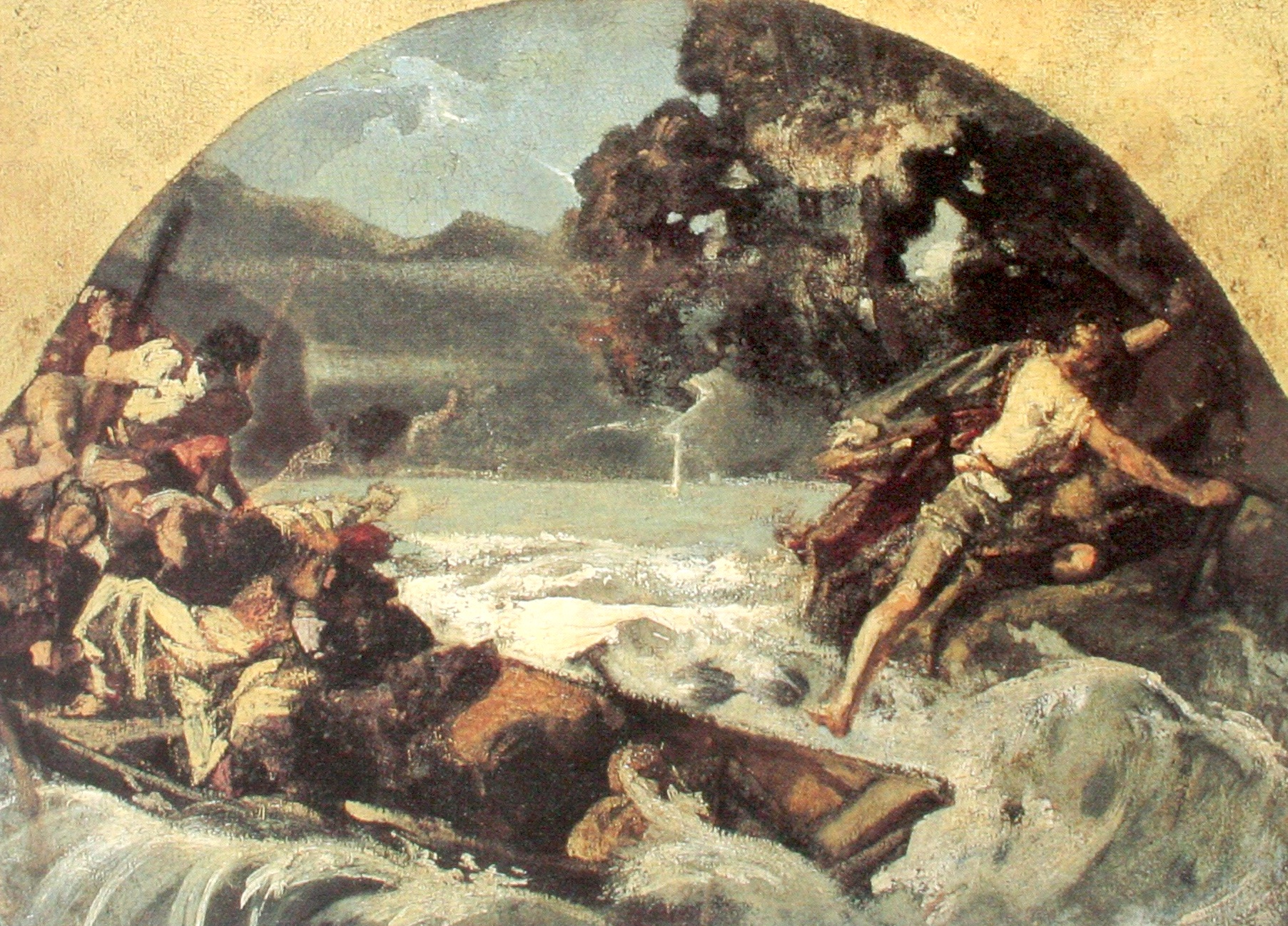
Tell's leap (Tellensprung) from the boat of his captors at the Axen cliffs; study by Ernst Stückelberg (1879) for his fresco at the Tellskapelle.

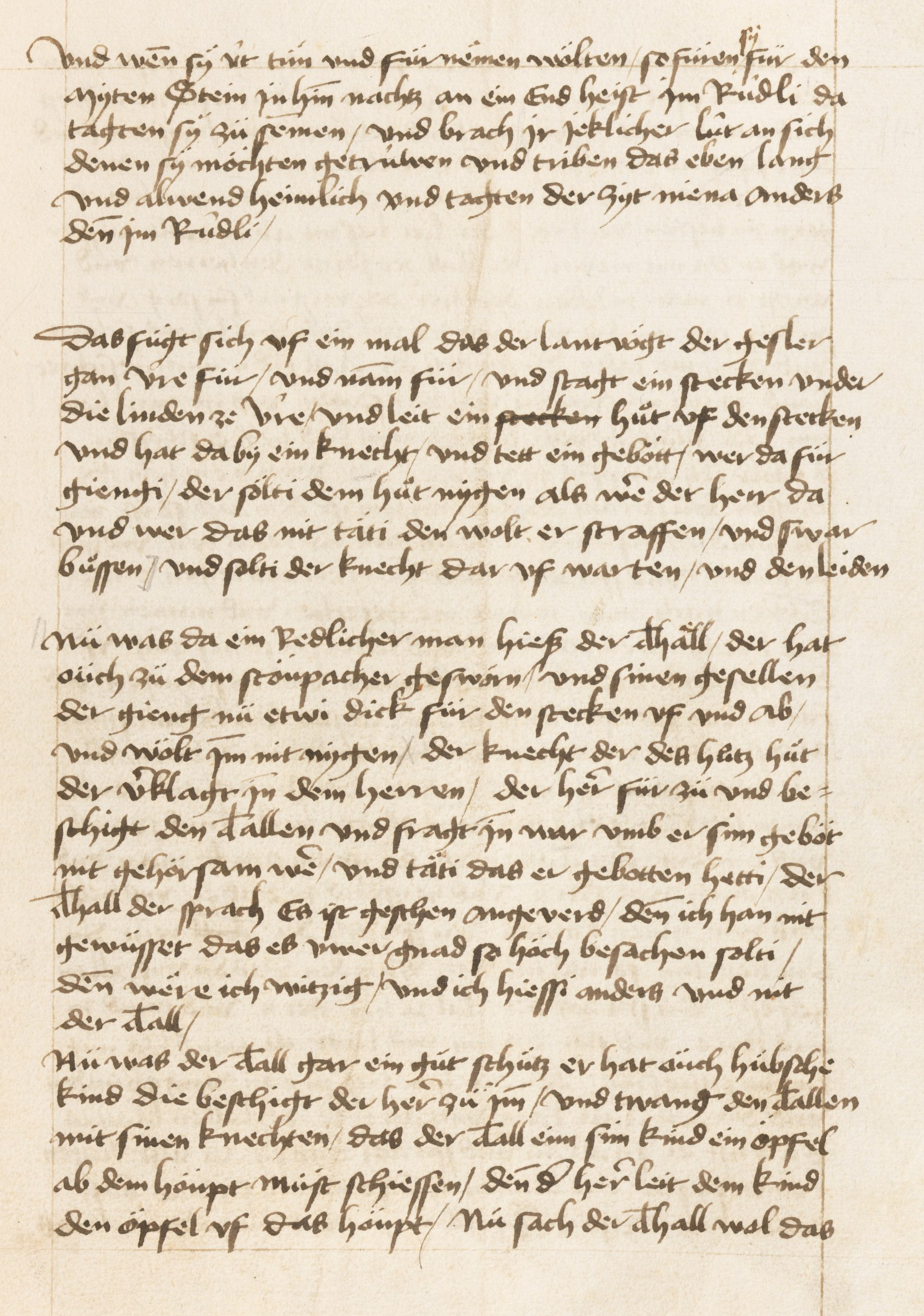
First page of the Tell legend in the White Book of Sarnen (pp. 447–449)

The first reference to Tell, without a specified given name, appears in the White Book of Sarnen (German: Weisses Buch von Sarnen). This volume was written in 1474 by Hans Schriber, state secretary (Landschreiber) of Obwalden. It mentions the Rütli Oath (Rütlischwur) and names Tell as one of the conspirators (Eidgenossen) of the Rütli, whose heroic tyrannicide triggered the Burgenbruch rebellion.

An equally early account of Tell is found in the Tellenlied, a song composed in the 1470s, with its oldest extant manuscript copy dating to 1501. The song begins with the Tell legend, which it presents as the origin of the Confederacy, calling Tell the "first confederate". The narrative includes Tell's apple shot, his preparation of a second arrow to shoot Gessler, and his escape, but it does not mention any assassination of Gessler. The text then enumerates the cantons of the Confederacy, and says it was expanded with "current events" during the course of the Burgundy Wars, ending with the death of Charles the Bold in 1477.

Aegidius Tschudi of Glarus, writing c. 1570, presents an extended version of the legend. Based on the account in the White Book, Tschudi added further detail. Tschudi is known to have habitually "fleshed out" his sources, so that all detail from Tschudi not found in the earlier accounts may be suspected of being Tschudi's invention. Such additional detail includes Tell's given name Wilhelm, and his being a native of Bürglen, Uri in the Schächental, the precise date of the apple-shot, given as 18 November 1307, as well as the account of Tell's death in 1354.

It is Tschudi's version that became influential in early modern Switzerland and entered public consciousness as the "William Tell" legend. According to Tschudi's account, Tell was known as a strong man and an expert shot with the crossbow. In his time, the Habsburg emperors of Austria were seeking to dominate Uri, and Tell became one of the conspirators of Werner Stauffacher who vowed to resist Habsburg rule. Albrecht Gessler was the newly-appointed Austrian Vogt of Altdorf, Uri. He raised a pole under the village linden tree, hung his hat on top of it, and demanded that all the townsfolk bow before it.

In Tschudi's account, on 18 November 1307, Tell visited Altdorf with his young son. He passed by the hat, but publicly refused to bow to it, and was consequently arrested. Gessler was intrigued by Tell's famed marksmanship, but resentful of his defiance, so he devised a cruel punishment. Tell and his son were both to be executed; however, he could redeem his life by shooting an apple off the head of his son Walter in a single attempt. Tell split the apple with a bolt from his crossbow. Gessler then noticed that Tell had removed two crossbow bolts from his quiver, so he asked why. Tell was reluctant to answer, but Gessler promised that he would not kill him; he replied that, if he had killed his son, he would have killed Gessler with the second bolt. Gessler was furious and ordered Tell to be bound, saying that he had promised to spare his life, but would imprison him for the remainder of his life.

Tschudi's tale continues that Tell was being carried in Gessler's boat to the dungeon in the castle at Küssnacht when a storm broke on Lake Lucerne, and the guards were afraid that their boat would sink. They begged Gessler to remove Tell's shackles so that he could take the helm and save them. Gessler gave in, but Tell steered the boat to a rocky place and leaped out. The site is known in the White Book as the Tellsplatte ("Tell's slab"); it has been marked by a memorial chapel since the 16th century. Tell ran cross-country to Küssnacht with Gessler in pursuit. Tell assassinated him using the second crossbow bolt, along a stretch of the road cut through the rock between Immensee and Küssnacht, which is known as the Hohle Gasse. Tell's act sparked a rebellion, which led to the formation of the Old Swiss Confederacy. According to Tschudi, Tell fought again against Austria in the 1315 Battle of Morgarten. Tschudi also has an account of Tell's death in 1354, according to which he was killed trying to save a child from drowning in the Schächental River in Uri.

== Early modern reception ==
=== Chronicles ===
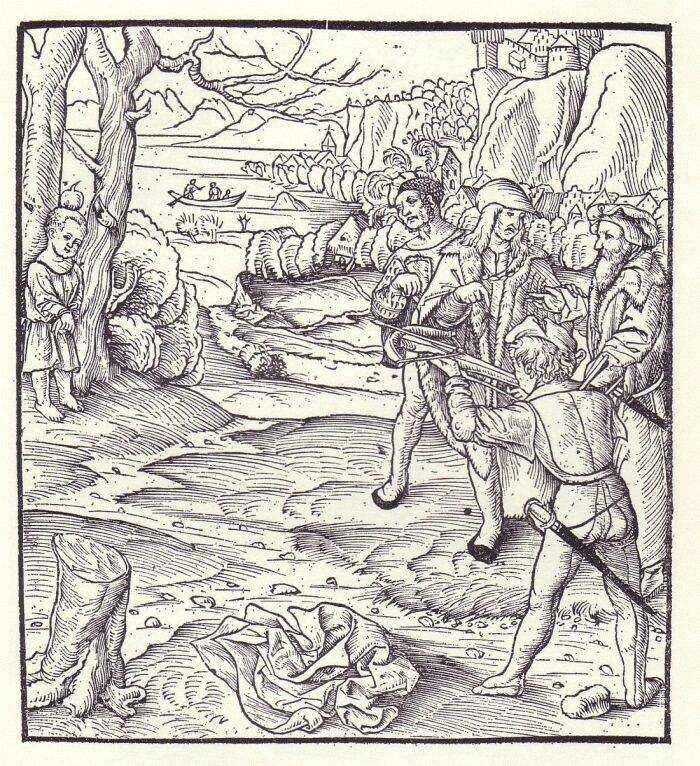
A depiction of the apple-shot scene in Sebastian Münster's Cosmographia (1554 edition)

There are a number of sources for the Tell legend later than the earliest account in the White Book of Sarnen but earlier than Tschudi's version of c. 1570.

These include the account in the chronicle of Melchior Russ from Lucerne. Dated to 1482, this is an incoherent compilation of older writings, including the Song of the Founding of the Confederation, Conrad Justinger's Bernese Chronicle, and the Chronicle of the State of Bern (in German, Chronik der Stadt Bern). Another early account is in Petermann Etterlin's Chronicle of the Swiss Confederation (Kronika von der loblichen Eydtgenossenschaft) of 1507, the earliest printed version of the Tell story.

The Chronicon Helveticum was compiled by Tschudi in the years leading up to his death in early 1572. For more than 150 years, it existed only in manuscript form, before finally being edited in 1734–1736. Therefore, there is no clear publication date of the chronicle, and its date of composition can only be approximated, as c. 1570 or before 1572. It is Tschudi's account of the legend, however, which became the major model for later writers, even prior to its 1730s print edition.

=== Popular veneration ===
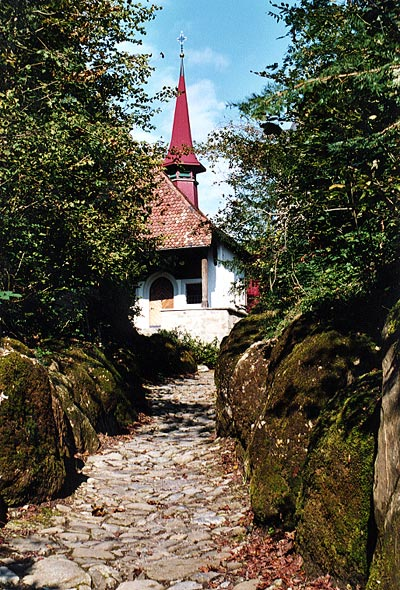
The Hohle Gasse between Immensee and Küssnacht, with a second Tellskapelle (built in 1638)

A widespread veneration of Tell, including sight-seeing excursions to the scenes of his deeds, can be ascertained by the early 16th century. Heinrich Brennwald in the early 16th century mentions the chapel (Tellskapelle) on the site of Tell's leap from his captors' boat. Tschudi mentions a "holy cottage" (heilig hüslin) built on the site of Gessler's assassination. Peter Hagendorf, a soldier in the Thirty Years' War, mentions a visit to "the chapel where William Tell escaped" in his diary.

The first recorded Tell play (Tellspiel), known as the Urner Tellspiel ('Tell Play of Uri'), was probably performed in the winter of either 1512 or 1513 in Altdorf. The church of Bürglen had a bell dedicated to Tell from 1581, and a nearby chapel has a fresco dated to 1582 showing his death in the Schächenbach.

=== The Three Tells ===
The Three Tells (die Drei Telle(n)) were symbolic figures of the Swiss peasant war of 1653. They expressed the hope of the subject population in repeating the success of the rebellion against Habsburg Austria in the early 14th century.

By the 18th century, the Three Tells had become associated with a sleeping hero legend. They were said to be asleep in a cave at the Rigi. The return of Tell in times of need was already foretold in the Tellenlied of 1653 and symbolically fulfilled in the impersonation of the Three Tells by costumed individuals, in one instance culminating in an actual assassination executed by these impersonators in historical costume.

Tell during the 16th century had become closely associated and eventually merged with the Rütlischwur legend, and the Three Tells represented the three conspirators Walter Fürst, Arnold von Melchtal and Werner Stauffacher. In 1653, three men dressed in historical costume representing the Three Tells appeared in Schüpfheim. Other impersonations of the Three Tells also appeared in the Freie Ämter and in the Emmental.

The first impersonators of the Three Tells were Hans Zemp, Kaspar Unternährer of Schüpfheim and Ueli Dahinden of Hasle. They appeared at a number of important peasant conferences during the war, symbolizing the continuity of the present rebellion with the resistance movement against the Habsburg overlords at the origin of the Swiss Confederacy. Unternährer and Dahinden fled to the Entlebuch alps before the arrival of the troops of General Sebastian Peregrin Zwyer; Zemp escaped to the Alsace region. After the suppression of the rebellion, the peasants voted for a tyrannicide, directly inspired by the Tell legend, attempting to kill the Lucerne Schultheiss Ulrich Dulliker.

Dahinden and Unternährer returned in their roles of Tells, joined by Hans Stadelmann replacing Zemp. In an ambush, they managed to injure Dulliker and killed a member of the Lucerne parliament, Caspar Studer. The assassination attempt — an exceptional act in the culture of the Old Swiss Confederacy — was widely recognized and welcomed among the peasant population, but its impact was not sufficient to rekindle the rebellion.

Even though it did not have any direct political effect, its symbolic value was considerable, placing the Lucerne authorities in the role of the tyrant (Habsburg and Gessler) and the peasant population in that of the freedom fighters (Tell). The Three Tells after the deed went to mass, still wearing their costumes, without being molested. Dahinden and Unternährer were eventually killed in October 1653 by Lucerne troops under Colonel Alphons von Sonnenberg. In July 1654, Zemp betrayed his successor Stadelmann in exchange for pardon and Stadelmann was executed on 15 July 1654.

The Three Tells appear in a 1672 comedy by Johann Caspar Weissenbach. The "sleeping hero" version of the Three Tells legend was published in Deutsche Sagen by the Brothers Grimm in 1816 (no. 298). It is also the subject of Felicia Hemans's poem The Cavern of the Three Tells of 1824.

== Modern reception ==
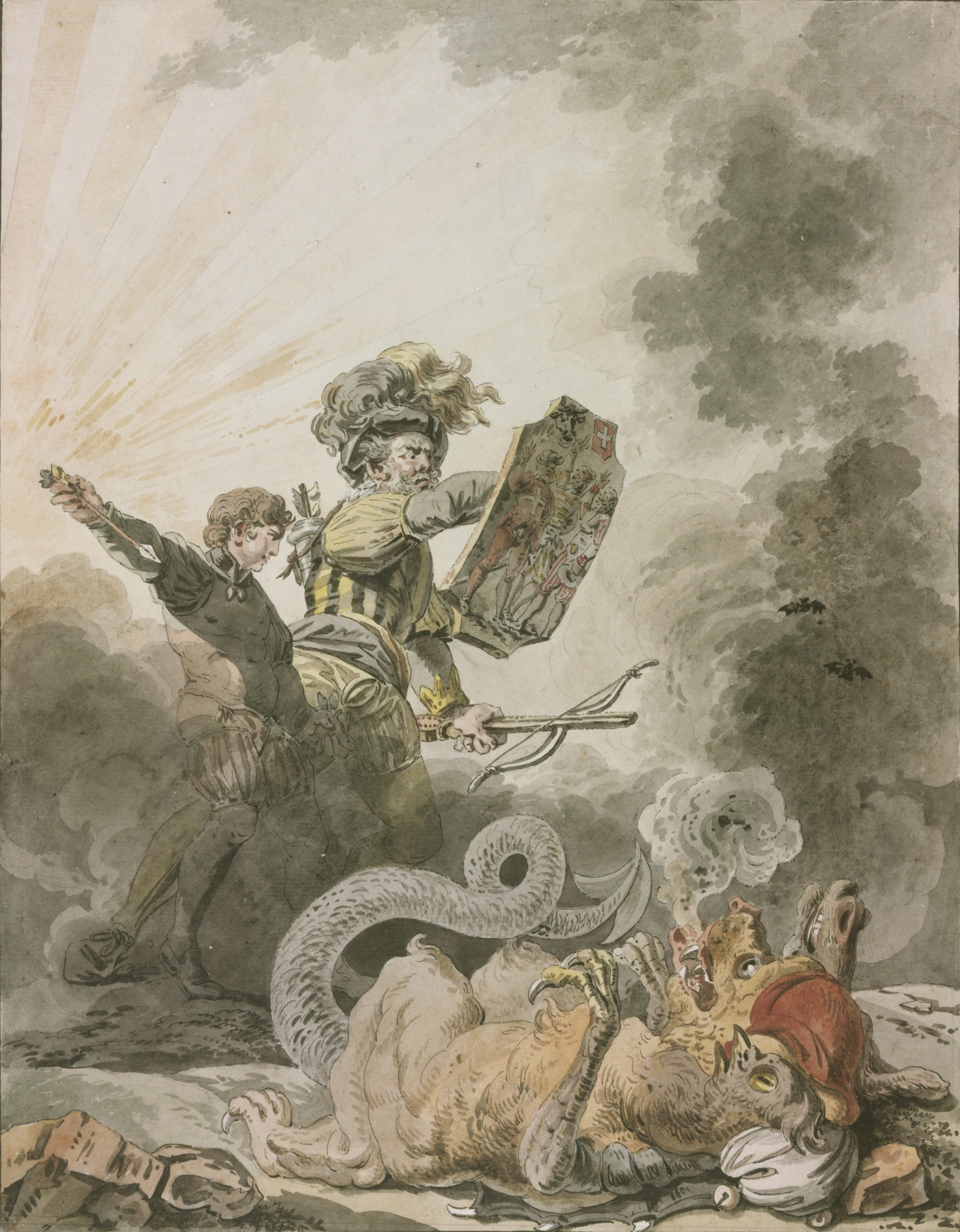
An allegorical Tell defeating the chimera of the French Revolution (1798)

Official seal of the smaller council (kleiner Rath) of the Helvetic Republic

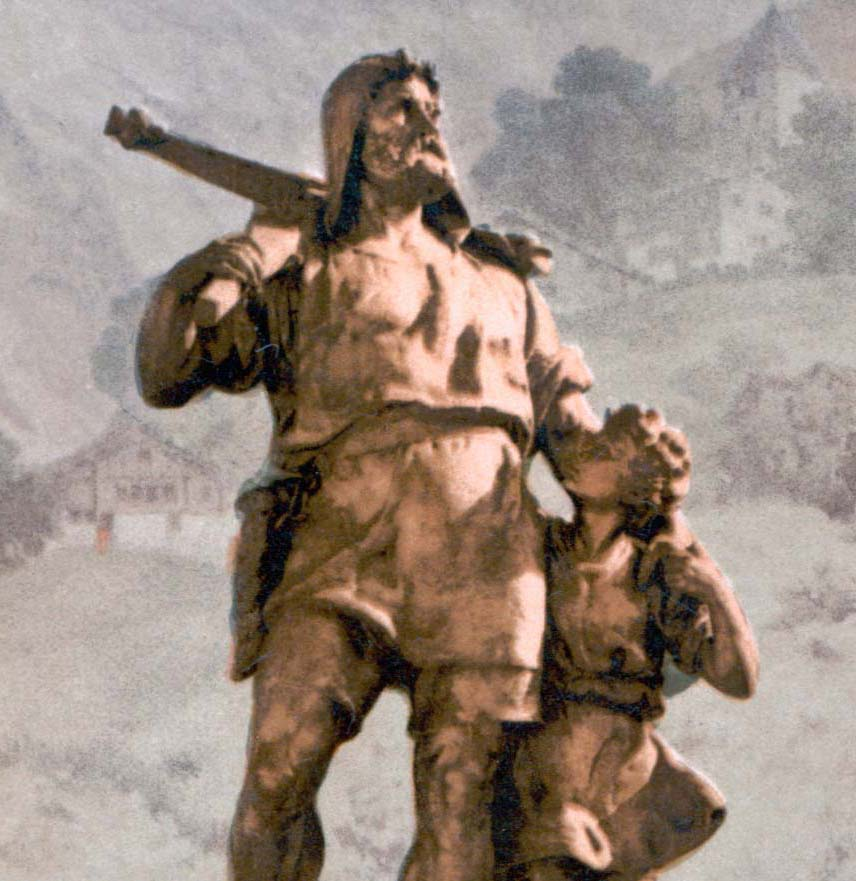
Detail from the Statue of William Tell and his son in Altdorf (Richard Kissling, 1895)

Throughout the long nineteenth century, and into the World War II period, Tell was perceived as a symbol of rebellion against tyranny both in Switzerland and in Europe.

Antoine-Marin Lemierre wrote a play inspired by Tell in 1766 and revived it in 1786. The success of this work established the association of Tell as a fighter against tyranny with the history of the French Revolution. The French revolutionary fascination with Tell was reflected in Switzerland with the establishment of the Helvetic Republic. Tell became, as it were, the mascot of the short-lived republic, his figure being featured on its official seal. The French Navy also had a Tonnant-class ship of the line named Guillaume Tell, which was captured by the British Royal Navy in 1800.

Benito Juarez, President of Mexico and national hero, chose the alias Guillermo Tell (the Spanish version of William Tell) when he joined the Freemasons; he picked this name because he liked and admired the story and character of Tell whom he considered a symbol of freedom and resistance.

Tschudi's Chronicon Helveticum continued to be taken at face value as a historiographical source well into the 19th century, so that Tschudi's version of the legend is not only used as a model in Friedrich Schiller's play William Tell (1804) but is also reported in historiographical works of the time, including Johannes von Müller's History of the Swiss Confederation (Geschichte Schweizerischer Eidgenossenschaft, 1780).

Johann Wolfgang von Goethe learned of the Tell saga during his travels through Switzerland between 1775 and 1795. He obtained a copy of Tschudi's chronicles and considered writing a play about Tell, but ultimately gave the idea to his friend Schiller, who in 1803–04 wrote the play Wilhelm Tell, first performed on 17 March 1804, in Weimar. Schiller's Tell is heavily inspired by the political events of the late 18th century, the French and American revolutions, in particular. Schiller's play was performed at Interlaken (the Tellspiele) in the summers of 1912 to 1914, 1931 to 1939 and every year since 1947. In 2004 it was first performed in Altdorf itself.

Gioachino Rossini used Schiller's play as the basis for his 1829 opera William Tell. The William Tell Overture is one of his best-known and most frequently imitated pieces of music; in the 20th century, the finale of the overture became the theme for the radio, television, and motion picture incarnations of the Lone Ranger, a fictional American frontier hero.

Around 1836 the first William Tell patterned playing cards were produced in Pest, Hungary. They were inspired by Schiller's play and made during tense relations with the ruling Habsburgs. The cards became popular throughout the Austrian Empire during the Revolution of 1848. Characters and scenes from the opera William Tell are recognisable on the court cards and Aces of William Tell cards, playing cards that were designed in Hungary around 1835. These cards are still the most common German-suited playing cards in that part of the world today. Characters from the play portrayed on the Obers and Unters include: Hermann Geszler, Walter Fürst, Rudolf Harras and William Tell.

In 1858, the Swiss Colonization Society, a group of Swiss and German immigrants to the United States, founded its first (and only) planned city on the banks of the Ohio River in Perry County, Indiana. The town was originally dubbed Helvetia, but was quickly changed to Tell City to honor the legendary Swiss hero. The city became known for its manufacturing, especially of fine wood furniture. William Tell and symbols of an apple with an arrow through it are prominent in the town, which includes a bronze statue of Tell and his son, based on the one in Altdorf, Switzerland. The statue was erected on a fountain in front of city hall in 1974. Tell City High School uses these symbols in its crest or logo, and the sports teams are called "The Marksmen." The William Tell Overture is often played by the school's pep band at high school games. Each August since 1958, Tell City's centennial year, the town has held "Schweizer Fest," a community festival of entertainment, stage productions, historical presentations, carnival rides, beer garden, sporting events and class reunions, to honor its Swiss-German heritage. Many of the activities occur on the grounds of City Hall and Main Street, at the feet of the Tell statue.

John Wilkes Booth, the assassin of Abraham Lincoln, was inspired by Tell. Lamenting the negative reaction to his action, Booth wrote in his journal on 21 April 1865 "with every man's hand against me, I am here in despair. And why; For doing what Brutus was honored for and what made Tell a Hero. And yet I for striking down a greater tyrant than they ever knew am looked upon as a common cutthroat." (He himself was shot to death, without standing trial, days later.)

Following a national competition, won by Richard Kissling, Altdorf in 1895 erected a monument to its hero. Kissling casts Tell as a peasant and man of the mountains, with strong features and muscular limbs. His powerful hand rests lovingly on the shoulder of little Walter, but the apple is not shown. The depiction is in marked contrast with that used by the Helvetic Republic, where Tell is shown as a landsknecht rather than a peasant, with a sword at his belt and a feathered hat, bending down to pick up his son who is still holding the apple.

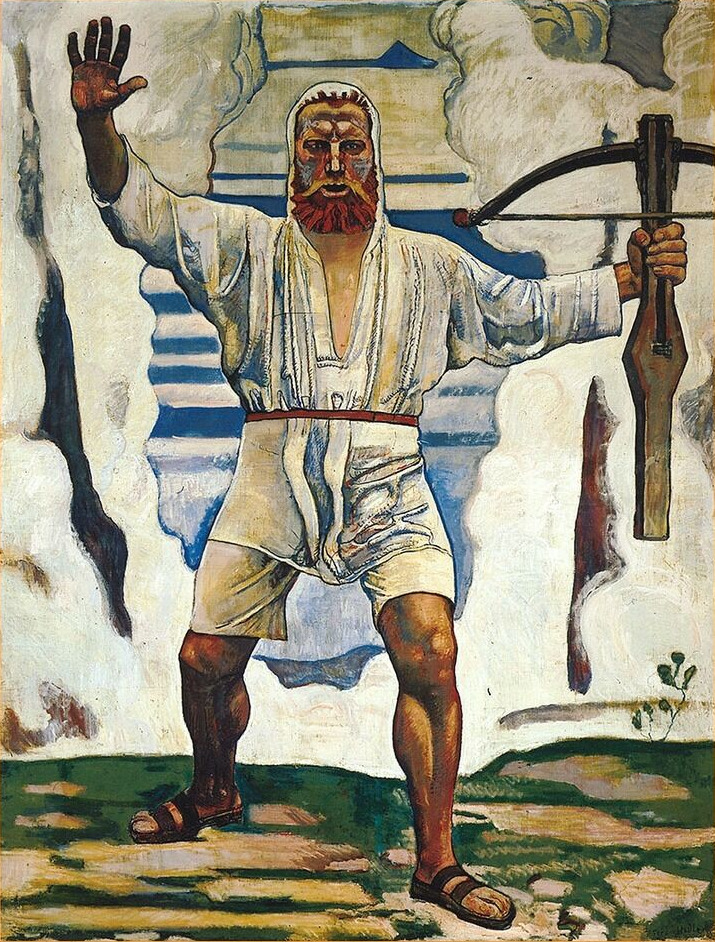
Wilhelm Tell by Ferdinand Hodler (1897)

The painting of Tell by Ferdinand Hodler (1897) became iconic. Tell is represented as facing the viewer, with his right hand raised, the left holding the crossbow. The representation was designed as part of a larger scene showing "Gessler's death", one of seven scenes created for the Swiss National Museum competition. Hodler's depiction of Tell was often described as sacral, and compared to classical depictions of God Father, Moses, John the Baptist, Jesus, or the Archangel Michael. In Tell's bearded face, Hodler combines self-portrait with allusion the face of Christ.

The first film about Tell was made by French director Charles Pathé in 1900; only a short fragment survives. A version of the legend was retold in P. G. Wodehouse's William Tell Told Again (1904), written in prose and verse with characteristic Wodehousian flair. The design of the Federal 5 francs coin issued from 1922 features the bust of a generic "mountain shepherd" designed by Paul Burkard, but due to a similarity of the bust with Kissling's statue, in spite of the missing beard, it was immediately widely identified as Tell.

Adolf Hitler was enthusiastic about Schiller's play, quoting it in his Mein Kampf, and approving of a German-Swiss co-production of the play in which Hermann Göring's mistress Emmy Sonnemann appeared as Tell's wife. However, on 3 June 1941, Hitler had the play banned. The reason for the ban is not known, but may have been related to the failed assassination attempt on Hitler in 1938 by young Swiss Maurice Bavaud (executed on 14 May 1941, and later dubbed "a new William Tell" by Rolf Hochhuth), or the subversive nature of the play. Hitler is reported to have exclaimed at a banquet in 1942: "Why did Schiller have to immortalize that Swiss sniper!"

Charlie Chaplin parodies Tell in his 1928 silent movie The Circus. Salvador Dalí painted The Old Age of William Tell and William Tell and Gradiva in 1931, and The Enigma of William Tell in 1933. Spanish playwright Alfonso Sastre re-worked the legend in 1955 in his "Guillermo Tell tiene los ojos tristes" ('William Tell has sad eyes'); it was not performed until the Franco regime in Spain ended.

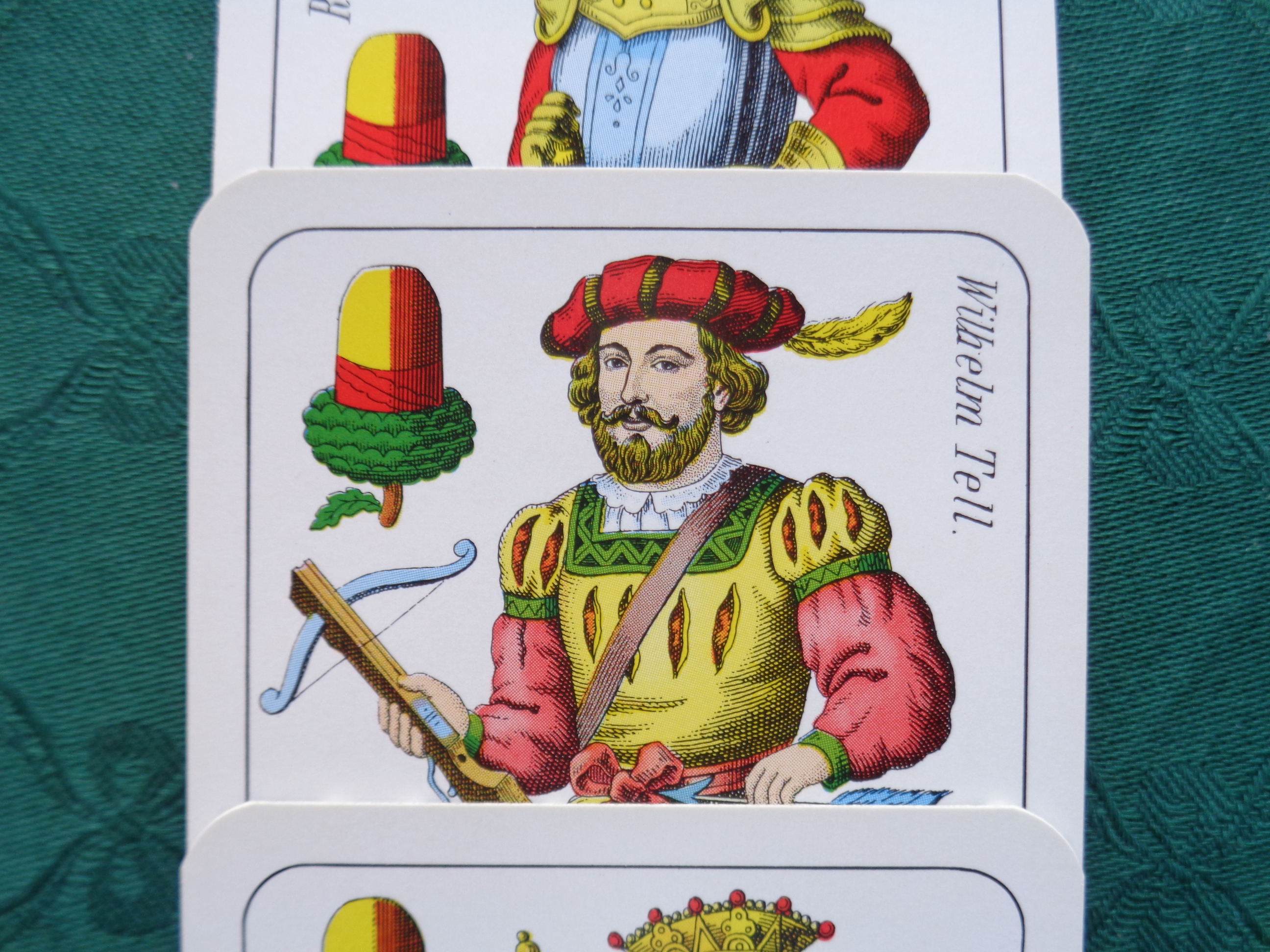
William Tell depicted on Tell pattern playing cards

In Switzerland, the importance of Tell had declined somewhat by the end of the 19th century, outside of Altdorf and Interlaken which established their tradition of performing Schiller's play in regular intervals in 1899 and 1912, respectively. During the World Wars, Tell was again revived, somewhat artificially, as a national symbol. For example, in 1923 the Swiss Post introduced horns for their coach service based on the overture of Rossini's Tell opera, and in 1931, the image of a crossbow was introduced as a logo indicating Swiss products. The Tell-Museum in Bürglen, Uri, opened in 1966.

After 1968, with ideological shift of academic mainstream from a liberal-radical to a deconstructivist leftist outlook, Swiss historians were looking to dismantle the foundational legends of Swiss statehood as unhistorical national myth. Max Frisch's "William Tell for Schools" (1971) deconstructs the legend by reversing the characters of the protagonists: Gessler is a well-meaning and patient administrator who is faced with the barbarism of a back-corner of the empire, while Tell is an irascible simpleton. Tell still remains a popular figure in Swiss culture. According to a 2004 survey, a majority of Swiss believed that he actually existed.

Schweizer Helden ("Swiss Heroes", English title Unlikely Heroes) is a 2014 film about the performance of a simplified version of Schiller's play by asylum seekers in Switzerland.

The Japanese historical fantasy manga series Wolfsmund, written and illustrated by Mitsuhisa Kuji and published by Enterbrain, is a retelling of the rebellion started by William Tell. The story revolves around the oppression that took place during the Middle Ages in the middle cantons of Switzerland.

In the 2019 Spanish comedy film The Little Switzerland, a Spanish town (Tellería) discovers the tomb of Tell's son and tries to become a Swiss canton (Tellstadt), affecting a Swiss identity.

In 2024, the film William Tell was created based on the Friedrich Schiller play starring Claes Bang who portrayed William Tell in the film.

During "Made in Switzerland", a musical number performed as an interval act during the first semi-final of the Eurovision Song Contest 2025, held in the Swiss city of Basel, William Tell appears as the "creator" of Eurovision, portrayed by Swedish television presenter Petra Mede.

== Historicity debate ==
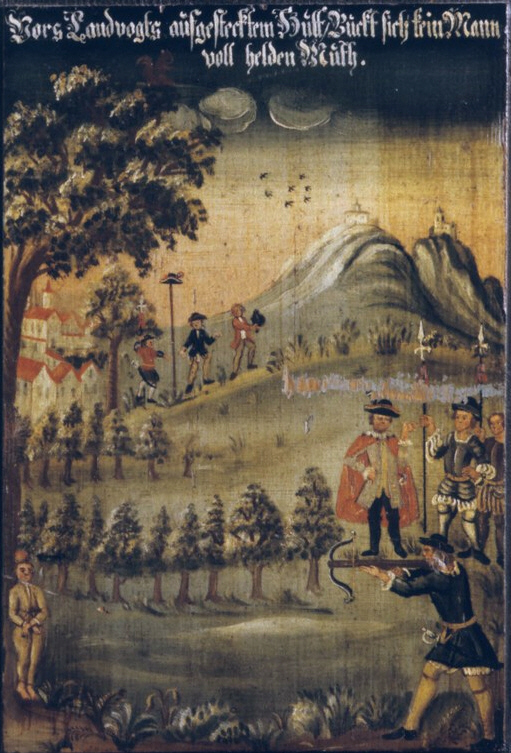
A 1782 depiction of Tell in the Schweizerisches Landesmuseum, Zürich.

The historicity of William Tell has been subject to debate. François Guillimann, a statesman of Fribourg and later historian and advisor of the Habsburg Emperor Rudolf II, wrote to Melchior Goldast in 1607: "I followed popular belief by reporting certain details in my Swiss antiquities [published in 1598], but when I examine them closely the whole story seems to me to be pure fable."

In 1760, Simeon Uriel Freudenberger from Luzern anonymously published a tract arguing that the legend of Tell in all likelihood was based on the Danish saga of Palnatoke. A French translation of his book by Gottlieb Emanuel von Haller (Guillaume Tell, Fable danoise), published under Haller's name to protect Freudenberger, was burnt in Altdorf.

The skeptical view of Tell's existence remained very unpopular, especially after the adoption of Tell as depicted in Schiller's 1804 play as national hero in the nascent Swiss patriotism of the Restoration and Regeneration period of the Swiss Confederation. In the 1840s, Joseph Eutych Kopp (1793–1866) published skeptical reviews of the folkloristic aspects of the foundational legends of the Old Confederacy, causing "polemical debates" both within and outside of academia. De Capitani (2013) cites the controversy surrounding Kopp in the 1840s as the turning point after which doubts in Tell's historicity "could no longer be ignored".

From the second half of the 19th century, it has been largely undisputed among historians that there is no contemporary (14th-century) evidence for Tell as a historical individual, let alone for the apple-shot story. Debate in the late 19th to 20th centuries mostly surrounded the extent of the "historical nucleus" in the chronistic traditions surrounding the early Confederacy.

The desire to defend the historicity of the Befreiungstradition ("liberation tradition") of Swiss history had a political component, as since the 17th century its celebration had become mostly confined to the Catholic cantons, so that the declaration of parts of the tradition as ahistorical was seen as an attack by the urban Protestant cantons on the rural Catholic cantons. The decision, taken in 1891, to make 1 August the Swiss National Day is to be seen in this context, an ostentative move away from the traditional Befreiungstradition and the celebration of the deed of Tell to the purely documentary evidence of the Federal Charter of 1291. In this context, Wilhelm Oechsli was commissioned by the federal government with publishing a "scientific account" of the foundational period of the Confederacy in order to defend the choice of 1291 over 1307 (the traditional date of Tell's deed and the Rütlischwur) as the foundational date of the Swiss state. The canton of Uri, in defiant reaction to this decision taken at the federal level, erected the Tell Monument in Altdorf in 1895, with the date 1307 inscribed prominently on the base of the statue.

Later proposals for the identification of Tell as a historical individual, such as a 1986 publication deriving the name Tell from the placename Tellikon (modern Dällikon in the Canton of Zürich), are outside of the historiographical mainstream.

== Comparative mythology ==
The Tell legend has been compared to a number of other myths or legends, specifically in Norse mythology, involving a magical marksman coming to the aid of a suppressed people under the sway of a tyrant. The story of a great outlaw successfully shooting an apple from his child's head is an archetype present in the story of Egil in the Thidreks saga (associated with the god Ullr in Eddaic tradition) as well as in the stories of Adam Bell from England, Palnatoke from Denmark, and a story from Holstein.

Such parallels were pointed out as early as 1760 by Gottlieb Emanuel von Haller and the pastor Simeon Uriel Freudenberger in a book titled "William Tell, a Danish Fable" (German: Der Wilhelm Tell, ein dänisches Mährgen). This book offended Swiss citizens, and a copy of it was burnt publicly at the Altdorf square. Von Haller underwent a trial, but the authorities spared his life, as he made abject apologies.

Rochholz (1877) connects the similarity of the Tell legend to the stories of Egil and Palnatoke with the legends of a migration from Sweden to Switzerland during the Middle Ages. He also adduces parallels in folktales among the Finns and the Lapps (Sami). From pre-Christian Norse mythology, Rochholz compares Ullr, who bears the epithet of Boga-As ("bow-god"), Heimdall and also Odin himself, who according to the Gesta Danorum (Book 1, chapter 8.16) assisted Haddingus by shooting ten bolts from a crossbow in one shot, killing as many foes. Rochholz further compares Indo-European and oriental traditions and concludes (pp. 35–41) that the legend of the master marksman shooting an apple (or similar small target) was known outside the Germanic sphere (Germany, Scandinavia, England) and the adjacent regions (Finland and the Baltic) in India, Arabia, Persia and the Balkans (Serbia).

The Danish legend of Palnatoke, first attested in the twelfth-century Gesta Danorum by Saxo Grammaticus, is the earliest known parallel to the Tell legend. As with William Tell, Palnatoke is forced by the ruler (in this case King Harald Bluetooth) to shoot an apple off his son's head as proof of his marksmanship. A striking similarity between William Tell and Palnatoke is that both heroes take more than one arrow out of their quiver. When asked why he pulled several arrows out of his quiver, Palnatoke, too, replies that if he had struck his son with the first arrow, he would have shot King Harald with the remaining two arrows. According to Saxo, Palnatoke later joins Harald's son Swein Forkbeard in a rebellion and kills Harald with an arrow.

== See also ==
- Arnold Winkelried, Swiss cultural hero
- Stauffacherin, Swiss cultural hero
- Tell City, Indiana

Non-Swiss figures:

- Punker of Rohrbach
- Robin Hood
- Toni Bajada
- William Wallace, (historical) medieval Scottish hero

General:

- Historiography of Switzerland

== Bibliography ==
- Bergier, Jean-François. Wilhelm Tell: Realität und Mythos. München: Paul List Verlag, 1990.
- de Capitani, François: "Tell, Wilhelm" in German, French and Italian in the online Historical Dictionary of Switzerland, 2013.
- Coolidge, William Augustus Brevoort (1887). "Tell" . Encyclopædia Britannica. Vol. XXII (9th ed.). pp. 155–156.
- Coolidge, William Augustus Brevoort (1911). "Tell, William" . Encyclopædia Britannica. Vol. 26 (11th ed.). pp. 574–576.
- Everdell, William R. "William Tell: The Failure of Kings in Switzerland," in The End of Kings: A History of Republics and Republicans. Chicago: University of Chicago Press, 2000. ISBN 0-226-22482-1
- Fiske, John. Myths and Myth-Makers: Old Tales and Superstitions Interpreted by Comparative Mythology, 1877. Ch. 1: (On-line) Quotes Saxo Grammaticus, the ballad of William of Cloudeslee, and instances other independent occurrences.
- Head, Randolph C. "William Tell and His Comrades: Association and Fraternity in the Propaganda of Fifteenth- and Sixteenth-Century Switzerland." in The Journal of Modern History 67.3 (1995): 527–557.
- Marabello, Thomas Quinn (2023). "The Origins of Democracy in Switzerland," Swiss American Historical Society Review, Vol. 59: No. 1. Page 95-97. Available at: https://scholarsarchive.byu.edu/sahs_review/vol59/iss1/4
- Rochholz, Ernst Ludwig, Tell und Gessler in Sage und Geschichte. Nach urkundlichen Quellen, Heilbronn, 1877 (online copy).
- Salis, J.-R. v.: Ursprung, Gestalt, und Wirkung des schweizerischen Mythos von Tell, Bern, 1973.
