= Urner Tellspiel =

The Urner Tellspiel (German: Tell Play of Uri) is the earliest surviving written version of a William Tell play.

The debut performance of Urner Tellspiel (whose full title reads Ein hüpsch Spyl gehalten zuo Ury in der Eydgnoschafft) was probably held in winter 1512/1513 in Altdorf, Uri.

However, it cannot be precluded that the story of William Tell was already frequently performed during the 15th century in an impromptu way and without standard text dialogues, following the example of the commedia dell'arte.

Apparently, the Urner Tellspiel was inspired to a great degree by the Song of the Founding of the Confederation (German: Lied von der Entstehung der Eidgenossenschaft) as well as by Petermann Etterlin's Chronicle of the Swiss Confederation (German: Kronika von der loblichen Eydtgenossenschaft).

The Urner Tellspiel was frequently performed and revised during the last five centuries. Its popularity, for instance, is attested by a letter of the Swiss reformer Huldrych Zwingli to his friend Valentin Compar in which Zwingli, a great admirer of this early Tell play, praised William Tell as "der gotskrefftig held und erster anheber eidgnossischer fryheit ..., ursprung und stiffter einer loblichen Eydgnoschafft".
