= Etterlin =

Etterlin is a surname. Notable people with the surname include:

- Egloff Etterlin (c. 1400–c. 1470), Swiss diplomat and economist
- Ferdinand Maria von Senger und Etterlin (1923–1987), German Bundeswehr general
- Fridolin von Senger und Etterlin (1891–1963), German General in the Wehrmacht during World War II.
- Petermann Etterlin (c. 1430/40–c. 1509), Swiss historian and writer
