= Swiss Confederation (disambiguation) =

The Swiss Confederation is the official name of Switzerland.

Swiss Confederation may also refer to:

- Swiss Confederation (Napoleonic), between 1803 and 1815

== See also ==
- Chronicle of the Swiss Confederation, the oldest printed chronicle of Switzerland
- Eidgenossenschaft, the German term
- Old Swiss Confederacy, the precursor of modern-day Switzerland
