= Ernst Stückelberg (painter) =

Swiss painter

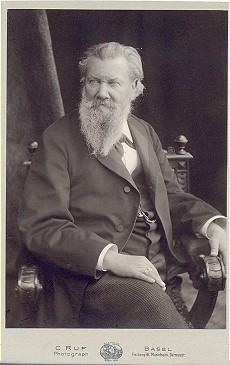
Stückelberg, 1900

Ernst Stückelberg (baptized Johann Melchior Ernst Stickelberger; 21 February 1831 – 14 September 1903) was a Swiss painter native to Basel, born to a family that traced its connection to the city back to the 14th century.

He was one of the most popular artists of his generation, of the romantic tradition, producing many paintings of various themes (portraits, country and village scenes, and allusions to history), including a series on the Swiss national hero William Tell. He formally took the name Stückelberg in 1881; this was duly registered by the Basel authorities.

== Background and early art school ==
Stückelberg came from an aristocratic Basel family, son of Emanuel Stickelberger and Susanna Berry. Following the early death of his father in 1833, he was brought up by his uncle, the architect Melchior Berri, to whom he was apprenticed. His leanings were towards art, having had formative school instruction under Hieronymus Hess and Ludwig Adam Kelterborn. So, after six months with his uncle, encouraged by Jacob Burckhardt, his mother's brother-in-law, he started studies with the portrait painter Johann Friedrich Dietler in Bern, continuing till 1850. He then was sent for academic training in Antwerp at the Academy of Fine Arts of Antwerp. His teachers in Antwerp included Gustaf Wappers, Louis Gallait and Josephus Laurentius Dyckmans. This period of study was intensive but Stückelberg made contact with an international array of enthusiasts: Hendrik Valkenberg from Amsterdam, Ernst Rietschel from Dresden, Knud Bergslien from Voss, Norway, Hans Peter Feddersen from Holstein, as well as Ludwig Burger from Berlin, Moritz Delfs from Holstein, and Theodor von Deschwanden from Stans whose portraits he painted (1852). From this period, a total of 44 watercolour portraits exist, and numerous sketch books; in his second year, 1851, Stückelberg won first prize in the "Concours". One early painting of this time, Elijah brings the widow of Zarepath her resuscitated child (1852), is notable for its vivacity.

== Experience in Paris and Munich ==
Having become acquainted with French art, he was further drawn to Paris, where he arrived during the period of Louis Napoléon's coup d'état of 1851. He met many other artists there, principally Theodor von Deschwanden, August Weckesser, Ludwig Knaus and Anselm Feuerbach. He copied works of Rembrandt, Velazquez, van Dyck, Corregio and Veronese in the Louvre. In 1853, after sketching in the Valais, the Simplon region and the Valtellina, the Tirol and Milan, he returned to Basel, but set off again for Munich to study miniature painting at the Academy of Fine Arts under Moritz von Schwind for three years, meeting Wilhelm von Kaulbach, Franz von Lenbach, Willhelm Busch and Heinrich Reimers in their studios, and painting their portraits. These latter had little influence on him, and Stückelberg retreated often to his rooms, somewhat disillusioned and also to escape the cholera in the city. From rather cramped quarters, he painted iconic Swiss historical themes, the best-known being: Melchtal returns to his blinded father (Landenberg's behest), The Sheriffs of Sarnen, The lady falconer, A girl in middle-age costume and Stauffacher's wife (calling her in-laws to fight for freedom), which last was purchased by the Confederation. An exhibition of his works back in Switzerland had caused a sensation, for which in 1856 Stückelberg was awarded the silver medal at the Berne Culture & Industry Exhibition of 1856.

== Sojourn in Italy ==
Returning for a short time to Basel, he painted King Henry II and Queen Cunigunde of Luxemburg (1855) on glass in the Minster, and Young upper class lady with a falcon (1856). He then set off for five months in Florence, and, encouraged insistently by Burckhardt, in Easter 1857 he left for Rome where he met old friends from Antwerp and Munich, Franz Dieber, Arnold Böcklin, Rudolf Henneberg and Anselm Feuerbach. The group would meet regularly in an Osteria or play Boccia. Other new influences included Kaspar von Zumbusch, Julius Moser, Polydore Beaufaux and Victor von Meyenberg. For some time he stayed with Fritz Simon at the house of Teresina Reinhardt at the Via della quattro Fontane 53, but during the heat of summer preferred to retreat to the country (as he had done from Munich) and establish himself in the Monti Sabini. He painted in Vicovaro, Cervara, and the village of Anticoli Corrado, where he integrated with the local people and had no shortage of models, including the local priest. Here he sketched, painted, and drew every facet of country life. From here stem seven albums of his output, as well as the famous works Evening in the Monti Sabini, A forest fountain and The Mary Procession (1858), the last of which hangs in the Kunstmuseum in Basel. This he placed on 24 January 1861 in a small room of the Basel Concert Hall for public viewing. Italy was his homecoming as an artist: he subsequently visited the country over ten times. Nonetheless, he never left Basel as his base.

== Establishing himself as an artist ==
Finally, Stückelberg returned in 1860 to Switzerland, establishing a studio in the Oberen Hirschengraben in Zurich. Monuments then being the rage, he was persuaded by Jacob Burckhardt to put in a design for the Battle of St. Jakob an der Birs (1444); this was rejected and a more conservative design chosen. In Zurich, Stückelberg befriended Rudolf Koller, Gottfried Keller (who greatly admired and extolled the virtues of the grand vistas of nature in Stückelberg's paintings), Friedrich Theodor Vischer and Conrad Ferdinand Meyer. With his painter friend Rudolf Koller, Stückelberg travelled to his homes in Meiringen and Hasliberg, and also to Paris and Cologne, and with Professor Bernoulli, his aunt's brother, to Haarlem, Zandvoort, the Hague, Leyden, Antwerp, Brussels, and Treves. Another trip to Italy needed to be aborted because of fever, and he diverted to the Tessin, painting the atmospheric Evening in Tessin (1863) and thence to St Moritz to recover. Otherwise, between 1860 and 1865, he painted portraits: Pastor Schläpfer and his Wife, Miss Anne Bischoff, The Sarasin children, Colonel Merian, The Baroness of Blonay, Mrs Schläpfer with a child. A number of other important works also date from this time: A Young Italian, Woman from Haslital with a jug in her hand (1860), Baptismal procession in Upper Wallis, Procession of Madonna of the Mountain (1861), The children's service, Girl with a cat on the arm, Faust & Gretchen (1862), The Pilgrims of Pereto (1863), and Portrait of Colonel Rudolf Merian-Iselin (1864) - who as president of the Swiss Society of Arts, Stückelberg tried and failed to persuade to set up a Swiss Art School. Finally, Mariuccia at the Fountain (1863-5), which whilst executing Stückelberg said he was most in his element and most happy. He painted Felicetta, and Romeo and Julia in the Village in the early 1860s. This was exhibited at the Paris World Exhibition of 1867, and subsequently overpainted as Youthful Love and is now in the Wallraf-Richartz Museum, Cologne.

== Marriage ==
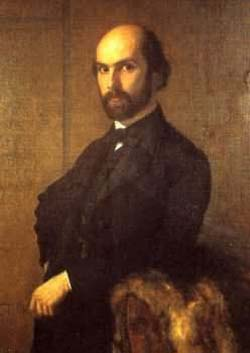
Portrait of Johann Jacob Bernoulli

In 1866, Stückelberg married Marie-Elisabeth Brüstlein, one of his art students, of an Alsatian family who had moved to Basel in 1852, born in Brooklyn, USA. He painted Portrait of the Bride and Self-portrait with a beret (1866-7). Their honeymoon, after some days in Wavre in Belgium, took them to Milan, Florence, Rome, Naples, Pompeii, Sorrento and Capri, from where many paintings stem typifying Stückelberg's grasp of light, colour and shade such as: Midday on Capri, Spring morning in Pompeii, and The Marionettes (1866-9), which accorded Stückelberg the Munich Gold Medal in 1869. Their first son, Ernst Alfred, was born in August 1867, and the family completed a trip via Bordeaux to Toledo and Madrid. Life surrounded by his family, with intervals in Amden, the Walensee, Kienberg in the Jura, and Montreux, occupied his time, evidenced by many paintings of children and home. These encapsulate a happy atmosphere, and scenes are painted with reality, stillness, even if including death, but with no sentimentality. The portraits of Margaret Bernoulli (née Berry) (1867) and of Mrs Charlotte Kestner (1868), as well as Renunciation (1868) date from this period. Further children, Marie (May 1869) and Alfred (September 1870) were born, and Stückelberg travelled to Munich, Dresden, Kassel, and Paris as an established artist.

== Home at the Erimanshof ==
In 1871, Stückelberg declined a professorship under Graf Kalckreuth in Weimar, preferring to remain in Basel. He purchased the Erimanshof, on Petersgraben, an ancient building adjacent to the Kreutztor, the other side of which stood the Seidenhof, on Blumenrain, dating from 1573. The painting that he had worked on in his studio in the house, The Painter's Family (1872), was shown at the World Exhibition of Vienna in 1873 and gained him the Knight's Cross of the Imperial Order of Franz-Joseph. He then proceeded over a period of 18 months between 1873 and 1874 to cover the walls of the Erimanshof with frescoes; these depicted the virtues Charity, Wisdom, Prudence, Diligence and Truth as feminine figures in alcoves, surrounded by decorative musical instruments, fruits, and animals. Wisdom was portrayed as a blonde teaching a boy to read his first word, amo, and Love as Marie-Elisabeth in an Italian hairstyle, with a child in her arms and two playing in the folds of her dress. This fusion of truth and poetry remained a constant theme with Stückelberg. The Kreutztor and the Erimanshof were destroyed in a traffic scheme of 1937, and the frescoes largely lost.

== Family life ==
Three more children, Gertrude (December 1871), Vico (1872), and Adrien (April 1874), were born to the family, and Stückelberg produced more works, The love figure merchant (1872), At the fountain of Rocca Ceri (1874) and The Butterfly Catcher (1875). However, his wife fell ill and the latter part of 1875 and 1876 was spent recuperating on the Côte d'Azur. There, numerous sea scenes and more pictures were painted: Wandering by the seashore (1876), St Raphael & Fejus, Children from Foreign Parts, Child with a large leaf (Ernst Alfred), Girl with a red cap (1877) and Girl with a Lizard (1876–84). This last appears as the work of the non-existent René Dalmann in Bernard Schlink's novel series Liebesfluchten. Stückelberg had begun what is perhaps his seminal work in 1875, The 1356 Basel Earthquake in three drafts, which he wished not just to be a historical portrayal of a catastrophic event but to discover the "soul" of the event, with a dead child held up to heaven in agony. It took Stückelberg ten years till 1885 to complete this work.

== The influence of Jacob Burckhardt ==
Jacob Burckhardt, professor of Art History in Basel, who had taken it upon himself to guide the career of Stückelberg, persuaded him to produce a monumental "untransportable" tableau, titled The Awakening of Art in the Renaissance, which adorned the staircase of the Basel Kunsthalle for an exhibition in 1877. This needs two earlier paintings, The Black death in Basel in 1349 and The Renaissance in Basel (1874) to explain its symbolism. Burckhardt saw Stückelberg as the painter, who, despite the political restoration of 1815 having failed to halt the dynamics of revolutionary change, looks for a higher world of beauty and harmony.

== Frescoes on the Tellskapelle ==
In the same year, Stückelberg beat Joseph Balmer to win an open competition to re-decorate the Tellskapelle on the Lake of Four Cantons, which had fallen into disrepair, a prize worth CHF 50,000. The Tellskapelle had gained as much significance to the Swiss as the Sainte-Chapelle to the French, and a stone of the old chapel had been transported to the US to be embedded in the Capitol, as symbolic for the fight for independence. For inspiration, Stückelberg travelled alone like a whirlwind through Milan, Bergamo, Brescia, Verona, Vicenza, Treviso, Padua, Venice, Parma, and Bologna. He wrote enthusiastically to his wife of the magnificent art he had seen, but realized on his return that the frescoes must depict true rural Swiss characters on Swiss soil in a Swiss context. So, despite the birth of his lastborn, Hélène, in April 1878, he moved to Bürglen in the rural Canton of Uri and painted 59 portraits of locals he would use for the chapel. These and several members of his family appear in four scenes, 'The Swearing on the Rütli', 'The Apple Shot', 'The Leap from the Boat', and 'Gessler's Death', based on Schiller's play, recounting the saga of Wilhelm Tell, an original freedom fighter for Swiss Independence. This story, and its remembrance, have as large significance for the Swiss as the Declaration of Independence has for Americans. Thus, as painter of these memorable events, Stückelberg carried a heavy responsibility, and gained consummate celebrity. Nonetheless, the whole project was threatened with cancellation when the cantons initially opposed a design which showed Walter Furst, the Uri Cantonal leader, with right hand outstretched towards heaven in priest-like mode, and the other two younger leaders, Arnold von Melchtal of Unterwalden and Werner Stauffacher of Schwyz, kneeling before him touching the sword in his left hand. After some acrimonious argument, mainly relating to costs, Stückelberg relented and re-drew the fresco to the satisfaction of the Uri politicians, with the three leaders standing (as traditionally symbolized) despite his artistic reservations. The works were unveiled in June 1883 and are open gratis to the public, visitable by boat, at least one of which, by Uri law, must halt per year at the Tellskapelle. For his efforts, Stückelberg gained a Doctorate honoris causa from the University of Zurich in 1883, as well as many other honours.

== Maturity as a painter ==
During this time, he also managed to complete a commission for Peter Conradin von Planta, which is probably his best known work, 'The last Knight of the Hohenrätien plunges into the Depths of the Via Mala', and hangs in the Federal Gallery of Chur. Now perhaps accustomed to "untransportable" works, he produced a mural, 'Desiderius Erasmus of Rotterdam' in Basel (1882), a fresco, 'Crowning of the troubadour Hadlaub' in Zurich (1883), and began several paintings, 'The Last Knight of Realt', a portrait of his mother, another of his wife, 'Supper on Manegg' (at the behest of Melchior Römer, the City President of Zurich, 1885), 'Consoler of the Orphan', 'Love Garden', 'Queen Bertha', 'Autumn Song', and 'Wildenstein Castle (Bubendorf)', where he had stayed in the summer of 1886.

The summer of 1887 was spent in Riggenburg and Spiringen, but in 1888, he once more went on travels to Assisi, Rome, Capri and his beloved Anticoli-Corrado. Here he was inspired to paint, virtually without halt, many landscapes and also major works demonstrating the maturity of his art, 'The Cypresses of the Villa D'Este', 'The Cliffs of Capri', 'View of Assisi' 'Violinist of Anticoli', 'A Melody of Oceans', 'The blissful ones', 'Jean de Souabe the penitent parricide', 'Pilgrim in the Abbruzzo'(1888). The following year he also painted three self-portraits.

== Death of his sister ==
However, in the autumn of 1890, his sister, to whom he was very close, died, and Stückelberg's art retreated into a contemplative mode: he drew portraits, and only three major works in the following six years: 'Death & Life', 'The Graveyard', 'Those cut off', but these full of depth of interpretation. However, during the mid to late 1890s, he seemed to gain a new lease of enthusiasm, and produced the magnificent works: 'The Prodigal Son' (1897),'The Last Secret', 'At the Source of Parnassus', 'Myrtis & Corinna with the potter Agathon', 'Sappho', 'The Fortune-teller', 'The Sirens', 'Crusader', 'The Sermon of the fish', 'And it was all a dream', 'Joan of Arc', 'Island of the Fortune-teller' 'Fisher & Nereids' (1899) and exhibited at the World Exhibition of Paris in 1900, receiving another gold medal in Basel that year. Travelling again to the Mediterranean, he produced enchanting sketches of St-Aygulf in 1896, Agay in 1897, where he painted Guy de Maupassant in front of his villa at Juan-les-Pins, Alassio, where he painted Martha de Montalembert in her Roman Villa (1899), and the remarkable 'Herd of Sheep under the olive-trees' and 'The beach at Alassio' (1901). In addition, he painted hundreds of 'Brettchen' (oils on small wooden boards, 12 x 22 cm) such as 'Villa Mignonne, St Raphael' which he created in the place of today's camera snaps. Many of these later works were exhibited posthumously at the Athenaeum in Geneva in 1904. A local journalist then wrote, "These last are perhaps, for us, the best."

Stückelberg died on 14 September 1903 of complications of diabetes.

== Impact of Stückelberg's art ==
Böcklin's art, now better known, differs from that of Stückelberg, but as he wrote to his mother in 1863, "Böcklin paints figures, and his characters are bearers of the landscape's impact, whilst I myself paint the life of the land, the village, the town." Indeed, Stückelberg's portrayal of real life, mixed with a dash of poetry and often of humour, marks his real genius and talent.

== Gallery ==
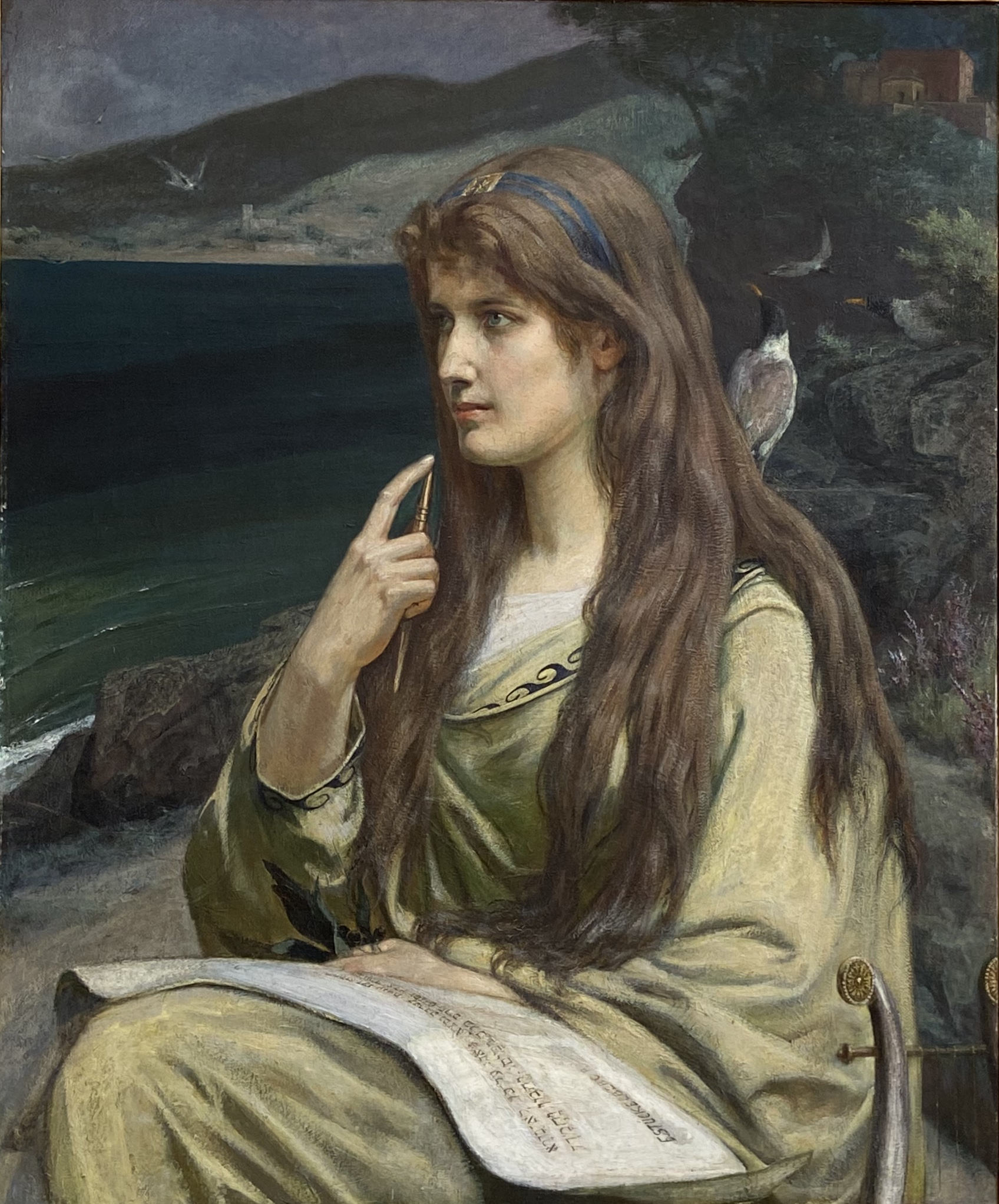
The Seeress

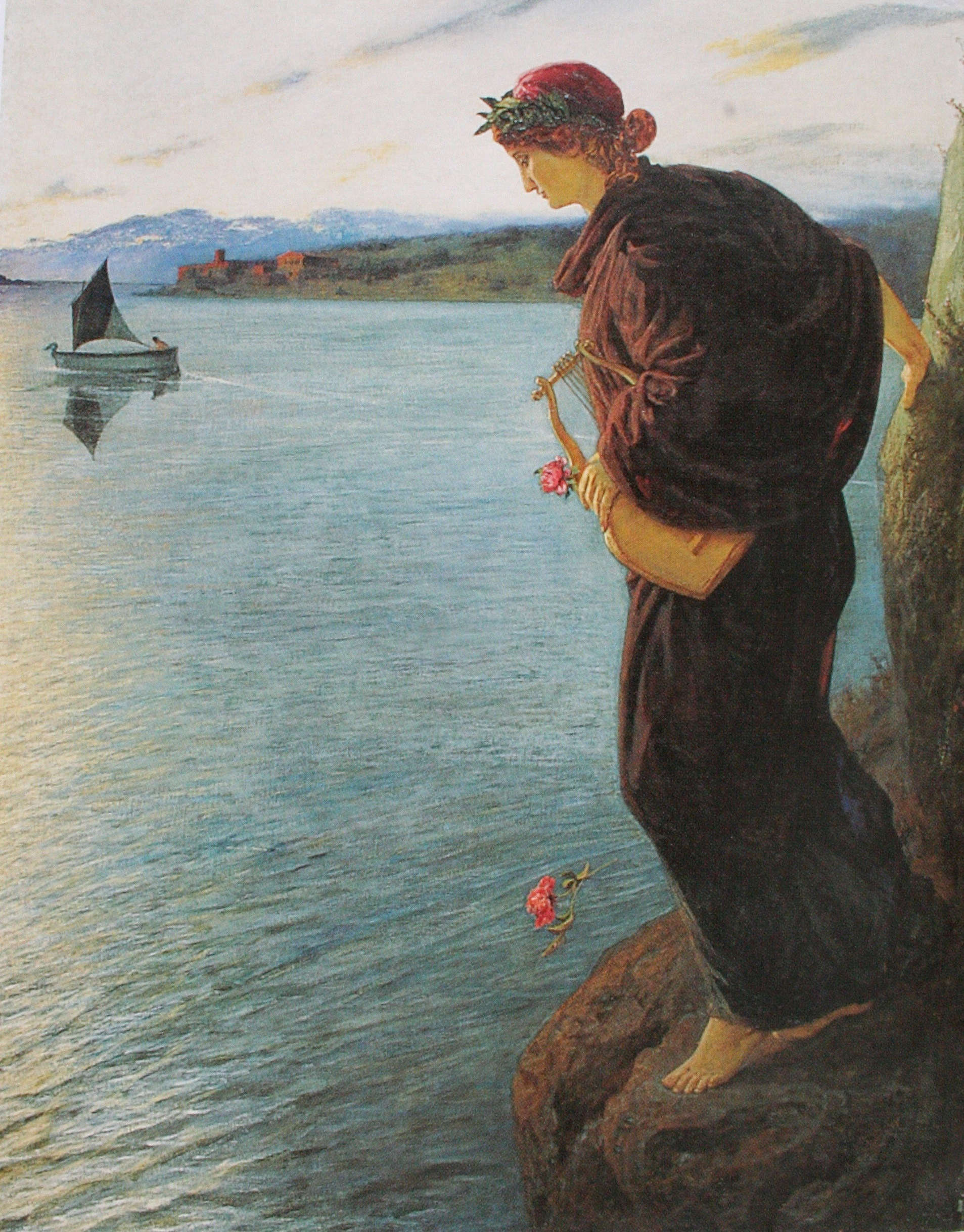
Sappho (1897)

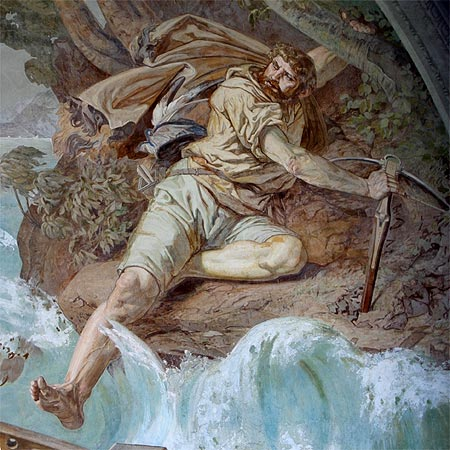
The Leap of William Tell

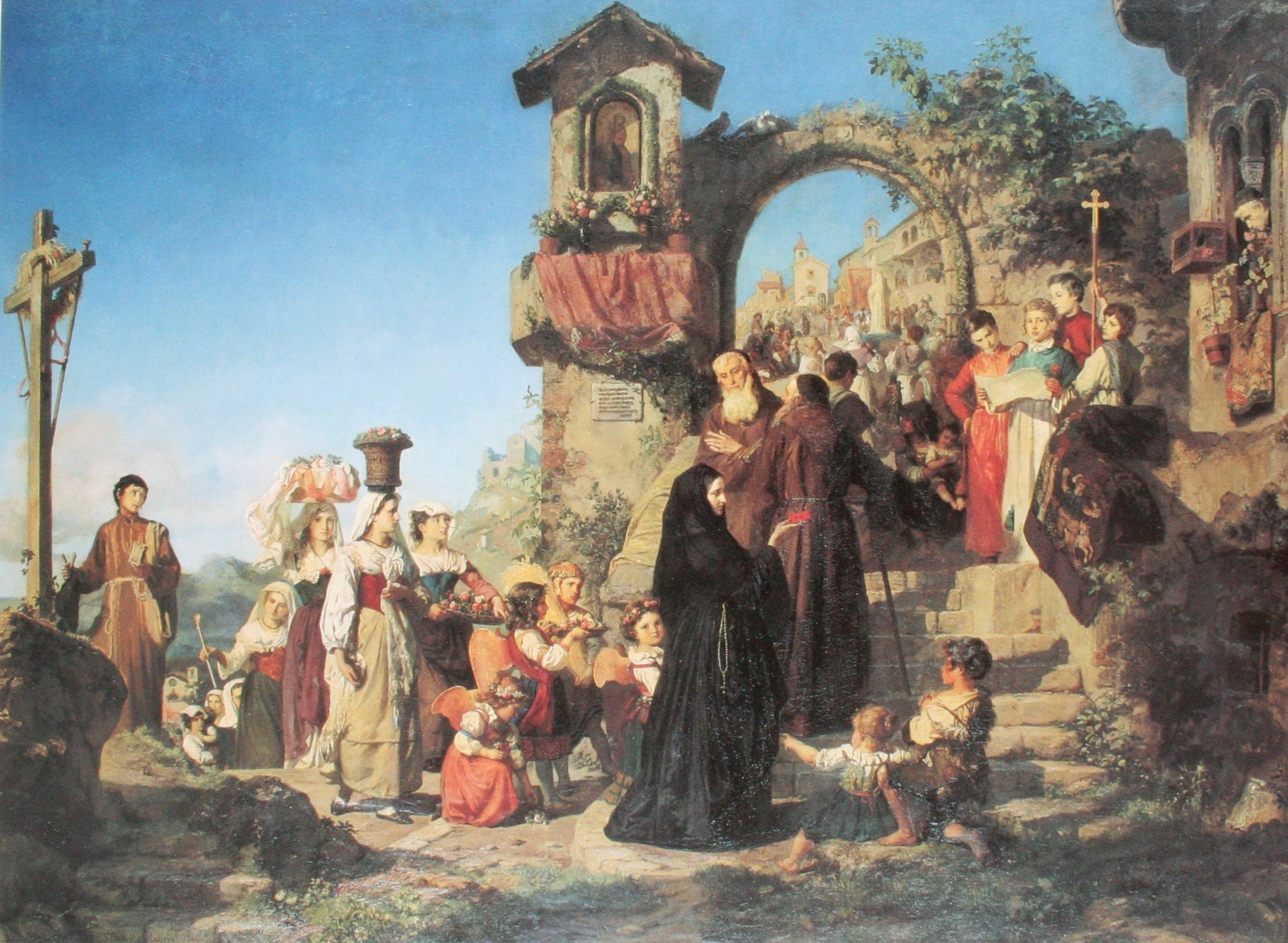
Wedding day in the Sabine hills
