= Tellskapelle =

Coordinates: 46.9326°N 8.6118°E

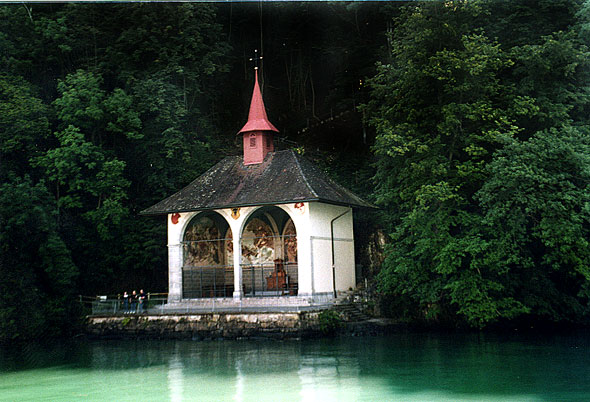

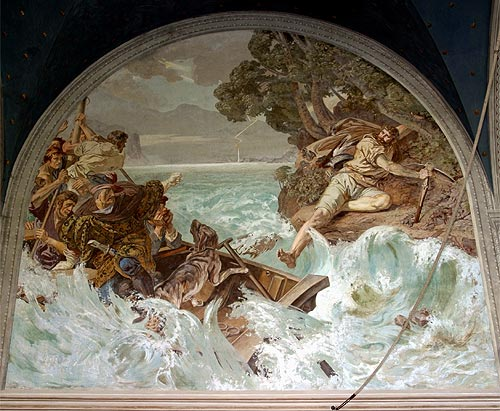
Tell's leap (Tellensprung) from the boat of his captors at the Axen cliffs. Fresco by Ernst Stückelberg, 1880–1882.

The Tellskapelle ("Tell's chapel") is located on the Tellsplatte or Tellenplatte ("Tell's slab") on the shore of Lake Lucerne at the foot of the Axenberg cliffs (an offshoot ridge of Glärnisch, 1,022 m), in the Sisikon municipality, canton of Uri, Switzerland. It is across the Bay of Uri (Urnersee) from the Rütli, some 4.3km away.

The Catholic chapel marks the site of the Tellensprung ("leap of Tell") where, according to legend, William Tell leapt from the boat of his captors during a storm and escaped, allowing him to assassinate the tyrant Gessler and initiate the rebellion that led to the foundation of the Old Swiss Confederacy. The Tellenplatte is first mentioned in 1470 in the White Book of Sarnen, as Tellen blatten.

The current chapel was built in 1879. It is decorated with four frescos by Ernst Stückelberg, realized in 1880–1882.

== In music ==
The incident of the Tellensprung is depicted in the character piece for piano "La chapelle de Guillaume Tell" by Franz Liszt, the first composition in the collection Années de pèlerinage, first year (Switzerland).
