= Egloff Etterlin =

Swiss diplomat (c. 1400-c. 1470)

Egloff Etterlin (c. 1400 – c. 1470) served as secretary of the city of Lucerne from 1427 until 1452, and during 1458/9 as judge.

A native of Brugg, Egloff received Lucerne citizenship in 1422. He married Agnes Stutzenbergin, daughter of Basel merchant Klaus Stutzenberg, and, after his first wife's death in 1439, Mechthild von Löwenbach as his second wife.

Besides acting as city scribe, he was the delegate to the Swiss Diet and to Milan. During the Council of Basel he sought connections to merchants of Verona, and later entered business relations with Milan in the interest of his father-in-law. He is the author of the "Silver Book" (Silbernes Buch), an extensive cartulary which was richly ornamented in 1505. Introducing Italian methods of book-keeping, he greatly facilitated the organisation of the Lucerne chancery, allowing the administration of the growing territory of Lucerne and its presidency in the Swiss Diet. Egloff is the father of chronist Petermann Etterlin who authored the Chronicle of the Swiss Confederation. It is uncertain whether Egloff himself was the author of a (lost) chronicle. Egloff died at some point between 1469 and 1477.
