= Lindelbrunn Castle =

- Burg Lindelbrunn, Lindelbol, Lindelbronn, Lindelborn
- Vorderweidenthal
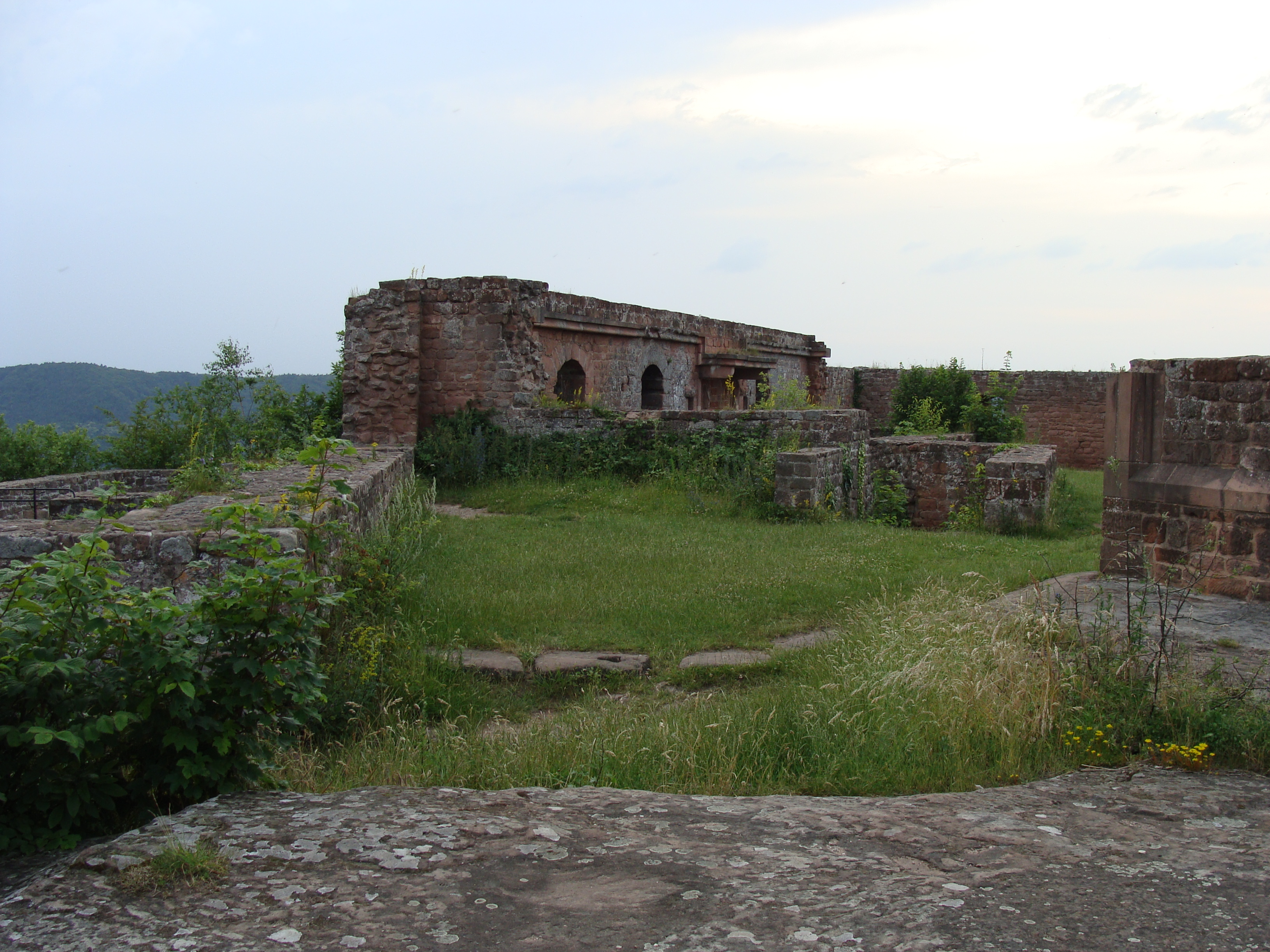
- Lindelbrunn Castle

Site information
- Type: hill castle, rock castle
- Code: DE-RP
- Condition: ruin

Location
- Coordinates: 49°08′40″N 7°53′47″E
- Height: 437.6 m above sea level (NHN)

Site history
- Built: around 1150
- Materials: rusticated ashlar

Garrison information
- Occupants: ministeriales

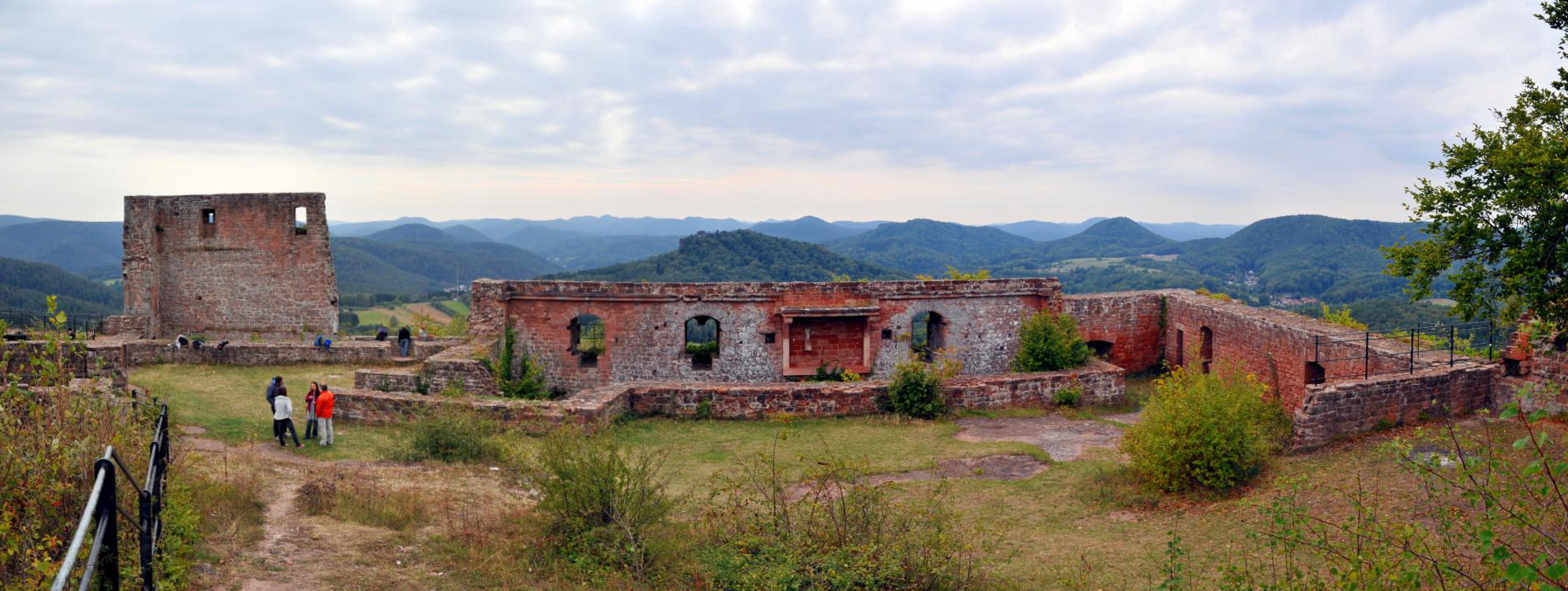
At Lindelbrunn Castle

Lindelbrunn Castle (German: Burg Lindelbrunn) (also called Lindelbol, Lindelbronn or Lindelborn) is the medieval ruin of a rock castle near the village of Vorderweidenthal in the county of Südliche Weinstraße in the German state of Rhineland-Palatinate.

The name of the castle is probably derived from the castle well which stands under a large lime tree (German: Linde).

== Geographical location ==
The ruins of Lindelbrunn lie about 2.3 km northeast of Vorderweidenthal, on whose territory they stand, and 1.7 km (both as the crow flies) south-southeast of Darstein. It is located at a height of 437.6 m above sea level (NHN) on the conical summit of the Schloßberg ("castle hill"). At its foot is a forester's lodge and a tourist café, the Cramerhaus, formerly belonging to the Palatine Forest Club.

== History ==
Lindelbrunn Castle was founded in the middle of the 12th century, presumably as an imperial castle to defend the Trifels. Prior to that, it may have been owned by the imperial church at Speyer. In 1268 the ministerialis, Dieter von Lindelbol, is mentioned for the first time in the records as a descendant of the imperial seneschal (Reichstruchseß), Markward von Annweiler (ca. 1140–1202). It is likely that the main construction phase of the castle with its palas and separate chapel dates to around 1190/1200. At that time, large halls and independent chapels were only built by relatively high-ranking lords; around 1200, not a single count had such facilities. In 1274 the castle was transferred by King Rudolph of Habsburg to Counts Emich IV and Frederick III of Leiningen. In the course of time, Lindelbrunn became a joint-inheritance or Ganerbenburg. As a result of the enfeoffment of various parts of the castle, there were so many co-owners that disputes arose. In 1381, St. Nicholas' Chapel was first mentioned in a deed. In 1441, troops of the Palatine prince-elector and the Bishop of Speyer, Reinhard von Helmstatt besieged the castle for seven weeks until a peaceful agreement ended the investment.

Shortly after Easter 1450, as a result of a feud and the seizure of Hans von Helmstadt, troops from the town of Landau and Bishopric of Speyer advanced on the castle. After four days of unsuccessful siege, Holzapfel was ransomed. In June that year, Count Emich VI of Leiningen-Hardenburg and his son, Frederick of Zweibrücken-Bitsch, besieged the castle, captured it and so ended the disputes.

During the German Peasants' War of 1525, the castle was razed by rebellious peasants of the Kleeburg Kolbenhaufen band. Since then it has remained unoccupied and fallen into ruins.

In 1963, the castle became the possession of the state of Rhineland-Palatinate. In 1979 to 1981 comprehensive remediation measures were carried out which saw the remains of the detached chapel being uncovered and partially restored.

== Layout ==
As there are steep sandstone rock faces on all sides, the castle did not need a neck ditch or a Zwinger. The curtain walls, of what is largely a stately home, are also the castle walls and follow the line of the terrain.

Of the outer entrance to the castle nothing visible remains. The surviving inner gate is in the northeast. An older castle entrance, south of it, can be seen as a shaft that was hewn in the rock. The foundations of the former St. Nicholas' Chapel (around 1190/1200) have been restored.

The most important visible remains are the preserved parts of the palas (around 1190/1200) in the southwest of the castle. The outer wall on the valley side is made of rusticated ashlars and has three niches with adjacent windows and a fireplace, which has not quite been faithfully reconstructed. The interior probably contained a large hall.

Although other outer walls and the remains of residential buildings have been partially reconstructed, it is still difficult to get a clear picture of what the castle looked like. At the highest point of the castle in the northeast, Lindelbrunn could have had a bergfried, but it has not yet been uncovered. Also unclear is the original purpose of the building remains on an overhanging rock outcrop in the southwest as well as the discovery of a well south of the outer wall of the palas and thus outside the curtain wall. Another well was located in the south of the castle near the chapel.

== Access and views ==
From the forester's lodge, Forsthaus Lindelbrunn, it is a 15 to 20 minute walk to the ruins of Lindelbrunn Castle. In clear weather, there is an extensive 360-degree panoramic view which also takes in the imperial castle of Trifels.

== Legends ==
=== Derivation of the name ===
When the knight who ruled the castle called his followers together in the courtyard to announce the name of the newly built castle, an old gray-haired woman suddenly appeared and stood in the middle of his retinue. While the knight and his entourage looked on amazed, she planted a lime branch by the well. She then said to the knight that as long as the lime tree blossomed, his family would also flourish and not wither. Before disappearing, she also said that the castle was henceforth to be called Lindelbrunn. The lime tree thrived and flourished, and so did the knight's family; he was popular throughout the land. But one day, the old gray woman met Rothkopf, the brother of the knight, who had been outcast many years before, in the forest. She wanted the brothers to reconcile and took him to the castle. But the knight at Lindelbrunn did not want to see his brother nor the old gray woman in his castle and threatened that if they did not go away they would be hanged on the lime tree. Then the old gray woman rose and stuck a distaff in the lime tree. With a rustling of the leaves the lime tree fell down the well. The old woman had broken off a small branch before the lime tree disappeared. She then left the castle with Rothkopf. At the foot of the mountain, she planted the branch and said to Rothkopf, he should build a new castle at this spot using the stones of the old castle. She disappeared and Rothkopf looked up to see the castle disintegrate in a violent storm and the stones roll down to him in the valley. Rothkopf rushed back up the hill to save his brother, but found only the ruins and no survivors. Back in the valley he began to build a house with the stones of the castle, as the old gray woman had told him. Today there are just ruins at the top of the hill and the forester's lodge is at its foot.

=== How the castle was destroyed in the Peasants' War ===
When the peasant mobs had made several attempts to burn the castle down and cause a bloodbath but failed because the castle was well defended by the knight and his foot soldiers, the peasants withdrew with heavy losses and gave up. The knight of the castle was celebrating his victory in fine style when a commoner stood before the gate in order to report the withdrawal of the peasants. He was invited in and given a meal. He praised the lord of the castle and wished him happiness. Believing he was safe the knight allowed him to stay the night in the castle. But when almost all those in the castle had fallen into a drunken sleep, the commoner seized his chance. He let down the drawbridge and the peasant mob, which had been waiting outside the castle, stormed in. They caused a bloodbath, stole what they could and burned the castle to the ground.

=== Punker of Rohrbach ===
The squire, Punker of Rohrbach, once worked for the knight of the castle and served him well. So one day he asked his master to make him a junker. When the knight refused him contemptuously, he left the castle and joined the army of the Count Palatine, Louis the Bearded. He was welcomed; his skills as an archer were widely known. Punker told the Count Palatine of several raids by the robber knight at the Lindelbrunn, whereupon the Count Palatine sent his troops to the castle. But the castle was well defended and the attack went nowhere. Then Punker climbed a nearby rock, which was higher than the castle and managed to fire an arrow into the heart of the robber baron of Lindelbrunn. Punker continued to fire and hit all the defenders of the castle. The troops of the Count Palatine were able to break down the gate, but all their opponents in the castle were already dead or dying, struck down by the Punker's arrows. The Count Palatine could not believe what he saw, suspected Punker of a lust for revenge guided by a magic hand and had imprisoned him for life in the tower. Punker died within the damp walls and his lament is sung today even by the thrushes at Lindelbrunn.

According to another legend, the Count Palatine was suspicious of Punker and wanted to test his accuracy as an archer. To do this Punker was asked to place a coin on the head of his son and shoot it off without injuring the boy. Punker refused out of fear that the devil could jog his hand and so his son would die. But the Count Palatine insisted on the trial on pain of death. Punker shot the coin from the head of his son without even grazing him and prepared another one even during the flight of the first. The Count Palatine was pleased but he asked Punker why he had prepared the second arrow. Punker replied that if his son had died, the second arrow would have been for him (the Count Palatine).

== Novel ==
Around 1950, priest and regional author, Nikolaus Lauer, wrote the novel Lindelbrunn. Erzählung ("Lindelbrunn. A Story"). Using the device of a first-person narrator (gallows priest in Landau, castellan at Lindelbrunn Castle, hospital priest in Speyer, vicar in Eschbach) he brought the period of the peasants' uprising to life – highlighting the themes of justice and mercy.

== Literature ==
- Magnus Backes, Heinz Straeter: Staatliche Burgen, Schlösser und Altertümer in Rheinland-Pfalz. Schnell & Steiner, Regensburg, 2003, ISBN 3-7954-1566-7.
- Marco Bollheimer (2011), Felsenburgen im Burgenparadies Wasgau–Nordvogesen (in German) (3. ed.), Karlsruhe: Selbstverlag, pp. 78 f, ISBN 978-3-9814506-0-6
- Viktor Carl: Pfälzer Sagen und Legenden. Ardwig Henning, Edenkoben, 2000, ISBN 3-9804668-3-3.
- Arndt Hartung, Walter Hartung: Pfälzer Burgenbrevier: Aufbaustudien. 6th edn., Pfälzische Verlagsanstalt, Ludwigshafen, 1985, ISBN 3-9801043-0-3.
- Walter Herrmann: Auf rotem Fels. Ein Führer zu den schönsten Burgen der Pfalz und des elsässischen Wasgau. DRW-Verlag, Leinfelden-Echterdingen 2004, ISBN 3-7650-8286-4, S. 120-121.
- Jürgen Keddigkeit (ed.), Ulrich Burkhart, Rolf Übel: Pfälzisches Burgenlexikon, Band 3: I-N. Institut für pfälzische Geschichte und Volkskunde, Kaiserslautern, 2005, ISBN 3-927754-51-4, pp. 430–448.
- Elena Rey: Burgenführer Pfalz. Superior, Kaiserslautern, 2003, ISBN 3-936216-15-0.
- Meinrad Schaab: Die Ministerialität der Kirchen, des Pfalzgrafen, des Reiches und des Adels am unteren Neckar und im Kraichgau – Hans Jänichen zum 65. Geburtstag. In: Friedrich Ludwig Wagner (ed.): Ministerialität im Pfälzer Raum – Referate und Aussprachen der Arbeitstagung vom 12. bis 14. Oktober 1972 in Kaiserslautern. Speyer, 1975, pp. 13–114. (dort die Vermutung, dass die repräsentativen Bauteile wie der Palas und die freistehende Kapelle in den 1190er Jahren unter Markward von Annweiler als Besitzer entstanden sein könnten, etwa parallel zum Kapellenturm auf dem Trifels).
- Alexander Schöppner: Sagenbuch der bayerischen Lande. 1852. In: Henri Frank: Pfälzische Sagen. Speyer, 1990, ISBN 3-921797-26-8, p. 82.
- Günter Stein: Burgen und Schlösser in der Pfalz. Weidlich, Frankfurt/Main 1976, ISBN 3-8035-8356-X.
- Alexander Thon (ed.): … wie eine gebannte, unnahbare Zauberburg – Burgen in der Südpfalz. 2nd edn., Schnell + Steiner, Regensburg, 2005, ISBN 3-7954-1570-5, pp. 90–95.
