= Punker of Rohrbach =

Punker (ˈpʊŋkɐ) is a legendary figure of the 15th century from the German village of Rohrbach (now part of the city of Heidelberg).

According to the Malleus Maleficarum, around 1430 there was an extremely accurate archer named Punker who was rumoured to possess supernatural powers. It was said that he had enabled the capture of a castle (castrum Lendenbrunnen, presumably Lindelbrunn near Dahn) almost single-handed with deadly shots from his bow. In addition a legend about him, similar to one told about the Swiss William Tell, is recounted in Malleus Maleficarum. The story goes that even the Count Palatine, Louis III of the Rhine, was in awe of Punker, so outstandingly accurate he was, whether on the battlefield or in the hunt. In order to try and trap him into admitting his magic powers, he ordered him to use his own son as a target and shoot a penny from the top of his beret. If he failed, the penalty was death. For a long time, Punker refused because he was worried that the devil might cause his normally safe hands to waver. Eventually he agreed to the test. Punker placed a bolt in his crossbow and then drew a second and tucked it in his tunic. He then fired and struck the penny off without grazing the boy's beret. When asked by the count why he had prepared a second bolt, at first he responds that it was out of habit, but when assured he will not be killed for answering honestly, he said "If the devil had caused me to miss and kill my boy then, sir, I would have put this second bolt through you because I was doomed to die, but I would have avenged my son."

The street of Punkerstraße in Rohrbach and the district magazine der punker are named after him.
