= Johann Friedrich Dietler =

Swiss painter

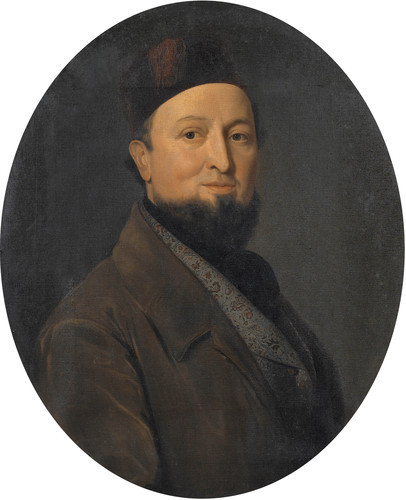
Portrait of Karl Emanuel Tscharner (c. 1860)

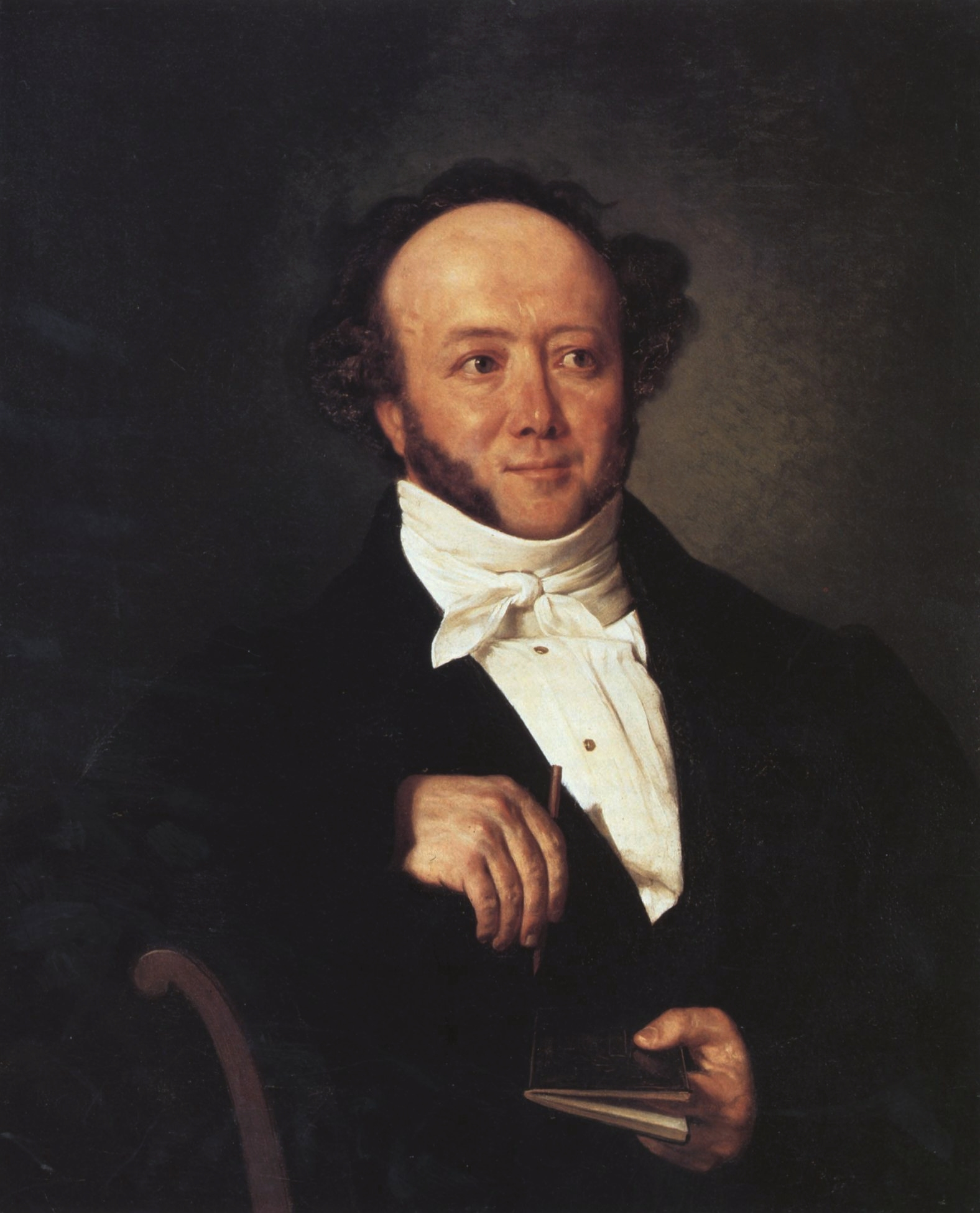
Portrait of Jeremias Gotthelf (1844)

Johann Friedrich Dietler (February 4, 1804 – May 4, 1874) was a Swiss portrait painter.

== Biography ==
Dietler was born in Solothurn, Switzerland, on February 4, 1804. His father was also an artist and he started painting in the family workshop. His first professional art instruction came from Karl Germann (c. 1790–1793), a local drawing master.

From 1822 to 1833 he was in Paris to continue his training under Antoine-Jean Gros, and copied the Old Masters in the Louvre. He later worked under Léopold Robert in Venice, Italy from 1834 to 1835. After spending some time in Geneva, he finally settled in Bern, where he worked primarily as a portrait painter and was very popular among the patricians there, as well as in Solothurn, Freiburg and Basel. He often painted from small photographs of his subjects, but was very concerned that photography would put portrait painters out of work.

For several years, he taught at the Bern Art School, where his students included Ernst Stückelberg and Friedrich Walthard. He died in Bern on May 4, 1874.
