= Melchior Russ =

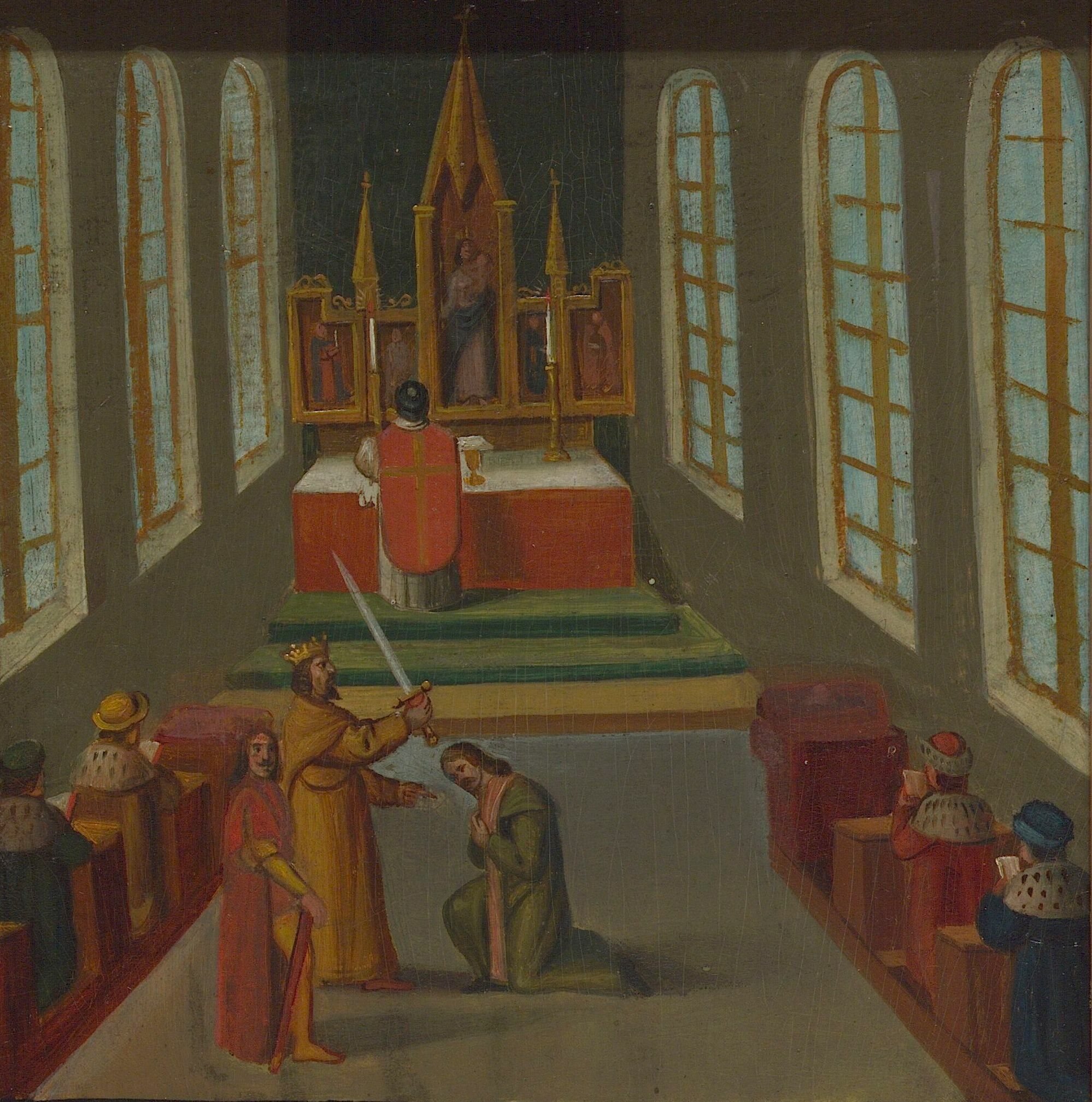

Melchior Russ (c. 1450 – 20 July 1499) was a Swiss historian.

== Biography ==
Russ was born in Lucerne in c. 1450, into an old noble family. In 1473, after having studied for at least two years in Basel, Russ left the University of Basel for the University of Pavia with the intention to study law.

After his studies at the University of Pavia, Russ served as a soldier in the Burgundian Wars, participating in the battles of Grandson, Murten and Nancy. In 1478, Russ was furthermore involved in a campaign of his hometown Lucerne against the city of Bellinzona. On occasion of the following peace negotiations between the Swiss Confederation and the Dukes of Milan, Russ probably seized the chance to make a journey to France.

According to the Swiss historian Jean-François Bergier, Russ was appointed magistrate and diplomat of the city of Lucerne around 1476. After his election to the council of Lucerne in 1480, Russ was furthermore promoted to the position of bailiff of Ebikon and Rotsee and, later on, to the position of bailiff of Malters and Littau.

In 1480, Russ, who had never resigned from his post as a chronicler, was commissioned by the council of Lucerne to chronicle the history of his hometown.

As Russ neared completion of his Chronicle of the City of Lucerne, he was appointed to a three-men delegation sent to the Hungarian King Matthias Corvinus, whose service Russ entered in 1488. After King Matthias' sudden death in 1491, the heavily indebted Melchior Russ, who had never been recompensed for his work at the Hungarian court, was deprived of his two possessions Sins and Rüssegg.

Deeply in despair, Russ entered the services of the elector palatine Philipp the Upright in 1491. After having signed a contract beyond the scope of his power, Russ was dismissed as Philipp's ambassador after only two years of service.

In 1496, Melchior Russ, who had resumed his post as a magistrate of the city of Lucerne, became involved in a lawsuit with the influential mayor Ludwig Seiler. As a result of this lawsuit, Russ was permanently banned from his hometown Lucerne on 18 May 1498.

During his exile from Lucerne, Russ, who had found a new place of residence in the canton of Uri, participated in the war between the Swiss Confederation and the Holy Roman Empire. Despite repeated petitions of his comrades in arms to revoke his banishment from the city of Lucerne, Russ was never allowed to return to his hometown.

Melchior Russ was killed in an ambush by the earl Eitelfritz von Zollen near Rheineck.
