= Chronicle of the Swiss Confederation =

Oldest printed chronicle of Switzerland

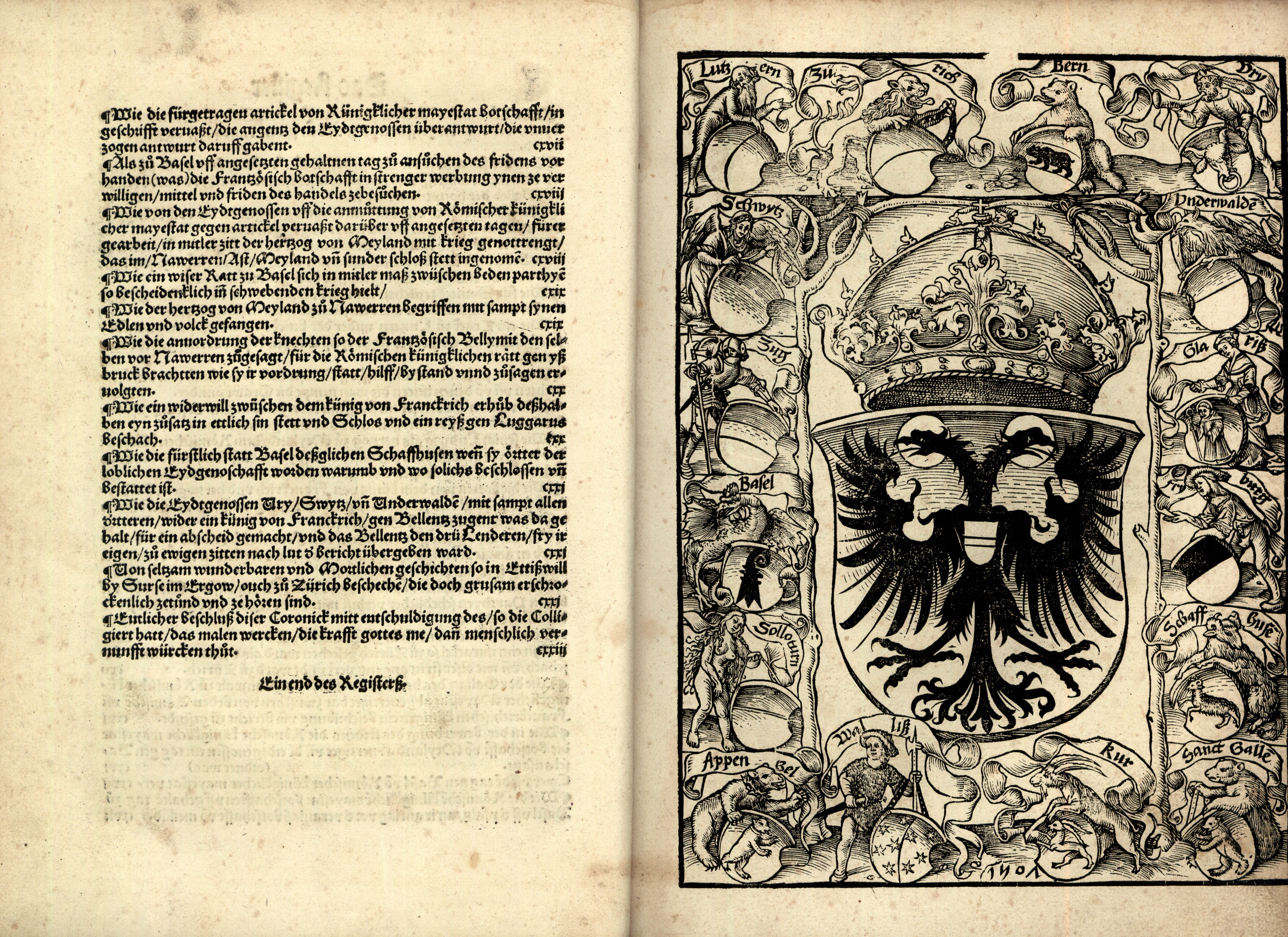
Chronicle copy, printed in Basell and held in the National Library of Poland collections

The Chronicle of the Swiss Confederation (German: Kronika von der loblichen Eydtgenossenschaft) is the oldest printed chronicle of Switzerland. The Chronicle of the Swiss Confederation was written by Petermann Etterlin’s from Lucerne. According to the Swiss historian Jean-François Bergier, Etterlin decided to compose a chronicle on the history of the city of Lucerne towards the end of his life, between 1505 and 1507. Etterlin’s chronicle, which was printed for the first time in 1507 by Michael Furter, is considered to be the earliest surviving printed version of the William Tell story.

Except for the section in which Etterlin describes his wartime experiences, the Chronicle of the Swiss Confederation is, for the most part, a compilation of earlier sources. As Müller observes, Etterlin’s chronicle is primarily based on Hans Schriber’s White Book of Sarnen (German: Weisses Buch von Sarnen), Conrad Justinger’s Bernese Chronicle as well as on a chronicle from Zurich.

Etterlin’s Chronicle of the Swiss Confederation is interesting from a historical standpoint because its author seems to have been familiar with an older version of the White Book of Sarnen than the one that is preserved in the public record office of the canton of Obwalden.
