= Tellenlied =

The Bundeslied ("Song of the Confederacy") or Tellenlied ("Song of Tell") is a patriotic song of the Old Swiss Confederacy. Its original composition dates to the Burgundian Wars period (1470s). The oldest extant manuscript text was written in 1501, the first publication in print dates to 1545. It consists of stanzas of six lines each, with a rhyming scheme of A-A-B-C-C-B. It is one of the oldest existing records of the legend of Swiss national hero William Tell.

It is also known as Altes Tellenlied "Old Song of Tell", in order to distinguish it from later compositions known as Tellenlied, such as that by Hieronymus Muheim (1613) or that by Johann Caspar Lavater (1767), and as Lied von der Entstehung der Eidgenossenschaft "Song of the Origin of the Confederacy".

== Composition ==
The song in its extant form was composed in several stages during the later 15th century. Since it ends with the death of Charles the Bold, it cannot have been completed before 1477. But since stanza 21 names the duchy of Milan as in league with the Confederacy, that portion was likely written earlier, in 1474 or 1475, as duke Galeazzo Maria Sforza also entered a pact with Burgundy in 1475, lending it military support against the Swiss, much to the discontent of the Confederacy, so that a Swiss poet writing in 1477 would probably not have mentioned Milan as an ally. The earliest part of the poem was probably just stanzas 1 to 13 (the Tell legend), to which the remaining text was added as the Burgundy War unfolded.

The earliest record of the poem is in a manuscript written by Ludwig Sterner in 1501, where it has the title von der eidgenossen pundt "of the pact of the confederates". The text was printed for the first time in 1545 by Augustin Fries under the title of Ein hüpsch lied vom ursprung der Eydgnoschaft und dem ersten Eydgnossen Wilhelm Thell genannt, ouch von dem bundt mit sampt einer Eydgnoschafft wider hertzog Karle von Burgund, und wie er erschlagen ist worden. A later edition was printed by Johann Schröter in 1623.

Although Max Wehrli, the last editor of the text supposes that this song was composed in the canton of Uri (Uri being mentioned explicitly in stanza 2 as the site of Tell's apple-shot and the place of origin of the Confederacy), the geographical origin of this early William Tell song is still a matter of debate.

== Structure and synopsis ==
The standard version of the Song of the Founding of the Confederation comprises 35 stanzas, each containing six lines. Another version omits five verses of the Tell narrative.

The first 14 stanzas explore the foundation and growth of the Old Swiss Confederacy, the expulsion of the foreign bailiffs as well as the story of William Tell. The account includes Tell's apple-shot, his admission that he had reserved an additional arrow to shoot the bailiff in the event of his killing his son, and his escape, but not his eventual assassination of Gessler.

Stanzas 15 to 23 describe the merits of the Swiss Confederacy. Stanzas 15 and 16 enumerate the eight cantons (Acht Ort) that formed the Confederacy up to 1480, viz. Zürich, Bern, Lucerne, Uri, Schwyz, Unterwalden, Glarus and Zug. Stanza 17 adds Fribourg (1481), Solothurn (1481), Biel (1496), Appenzell (1513), Schaffhausen (1501) and St. Gall (1454) as recent accessions to the Confederacy. Stanzas 19 to 23 mention pacts made by the Confederacy between 1481 and 1529, listing Sigmund of Austria (referring to pacts of 1477 and of 1511), the duchy of Milan (1474), the duchy of Lorraine (1476), and the five cities of Strasbourg, Colmar, Sélestat, Basel and Mulhouse (1529).

The final 12 stanzas focus on the Burgundian Wars. The poem records the defeats of Charles the Bold at the Battle of Grandson, where he lost "silver gold and jewels", at the Battle of Murten where Charles lost 24,000 men, and finally at the Battle of Nancy where Charles himself are slain. The final stanza is a pious invocation of God asking for the future protection of the Confederacy and the salvation of the poet.
