= Shooting an apple off one's child's head =

Folklore

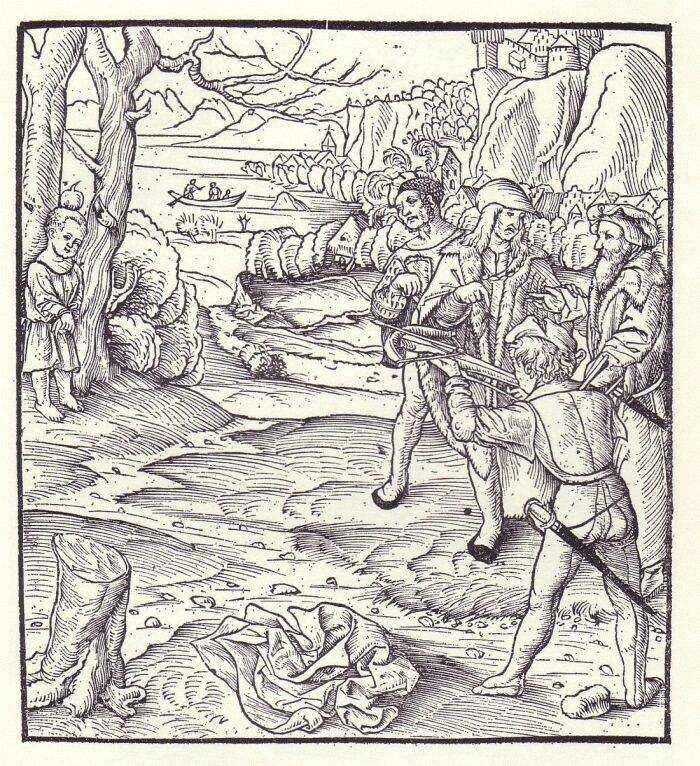
William Tell's apple-shot as depicted in Sebastian Münster's Cosmographia (1554 edition)

Shooting an apple off one's child's head, also known as the apple-shot (from German Apfelschuss), is a feat of marksmanship with a bow that occurs as a motif in a number of legends in Germanic folklore (and has also been connected with non-European folklore). In the Stith Thompson Motif Index it is F661.3, described as "Skillful marksman shoots apple from man's head" or "apple shot from man's head", though it always occurs in the form of the marksman being ordered to shoot an apple (or occasionally another smaller object) off his own son's head. It is best known as William Tell's feat.

== Examples ==
=== Palnatoki ===
The earliest known occurrence of the motif is from the 12th century, in Saxo Grammaticus' version of the story of Palnatoki, whom he calls Toko (Gesta Danorum Book 10, chapter 7).

Toko, who had been for some time in the service of the king [Harald Bluetooth], had, by the deeds in which he surpassed his fellow-soldiers, made several enemies of his virtues. One day, when he had drunk rather much, he boasted to those who were at table with him, that his skill in archery was such that he could hit, with the first shot of an arrow, ever so small an apple set on the top of a wand at a considerable distance. His detractors hearing these words, lost no time in conveying them to the ears of the king. But the wickedness of the prince speedily conveyed the confidence of the father to the peril of the son, ordering the sweetest pledge of his life to stand instead of the wand, from whom, if the utterer of the boast did not strike down the apple which was placed on him at the first shot of his arrow, he should with his own head pay the penalty of his idle boast. . . . When the youth was led forth, Toko carefully admonished him to receive the whiz of the coming arrow as steadily as possible, with attentive ears, and without moving his head, lest by a slight motion of his body he should frustrate the experience of his well-tried skill. He made him also, as a means of diminishing his apprehension, stand with his back to him, lest he should be terrified at the sight of the arrow. He then drew three arrows from his quiver, and the first he shot struck the proposed mark. Toko then being asked by the king why he had taken so many arrows out of his quiver, when he was to make but one trial with the bow, "That I might avenge on thee," said he, "the error of the first by the points of the others, lest my innocence might hap to be afflicted and thy injustice to go unpunished!"

Palnatoki later kills the king.

=== Þiðrekssaga ===
In the 13th-century Þiðrekssaga, chapter 128, Egill, brother of Völund, is commanded by King Nidung to shoot an apple off his three-year-old son's head:

Now the king wished to try whether Egill shot so well as was said or not, so he let Egill's son, a boy of three years old, be taken, and made them put an apple on his head, and bade Egill shoot so that the shaft struck neither above the head nor to the left nor the right.

Like Palnatoki, he keeps two more arrows to kill the king in case he fails, but the king does not punish him for saying so, but rather praises him: "The king took that well from him, and all thought it was boldly spoken."

=== William Tell ===
The best-known version of the story is in the legend of William Tell, supposedly happening to start off the Swiss revolution, written first in the 15th-century White Book of Sarnen, then in Aegidius Tschudi's 16th-century Chronicon Helveticum, and later the basis for Friedrich Schiller's 1804 play. Tell is arrested for failing to bow in respect to the hat that the newly appointed Austrian Vogt, Albrecht Gessler, has placed on a pole, and Gessler commands him to shoot an apple off his son's head with a single bolt from his crossbow. After splitting the apple with the single shot (supposedly on November 18, 1307), Tell is asked why he took more than one bolt out; at first he responds that it was out of habit, but when assured he will not be killed for answering honestly, says the second bolt was meant for Gessler's heart should he fail. In Schiller's play, the demand to shoot the apple off the boy's head motivates Gessler's murder.

=== Malleus Maleficarum ===
In Heinrich Kramer's 1486 Malleus Maleficarum (Book 2, chapter 16), a related story occurs: Punker of Rohrbach (also spelled Puncker or Puncher) in the Upper Rhineland is said to have been ordered by "a very eminent person" in about 1430 to prove his extraordinary marksmanship (regarded by Kramer as a sign of consorting with the devil) by shooting a penny off the cap on his young son's head without disturbing the cap. He, too, kept a second arrow in reserve to kill the prince in case he failed.

=== Henning Wulf ===
Henning Wulf, or von Wulfen, of Wewelsfleth in Holstein sided with Count Gerhard in 1472 and was banished by King Christian I of Denmark. In a folk tale, the king had him shoot an apple off his son's head, and a window in the Wewelsfleth church depicted the boy with an apple on his head, pierced through by the arrow, while Henning's bow was undrawn but there was another arrow between his teeth. Between archer and boy there was a wolf.

=== William of Cloudeslee ===
In the Northumbrian ballad of Adam Bell, Clym of the Clough, and Wyllyam of Cloudeslee, which was a source of Walter Scott's Ivanhoe, William of Cloudeslee tells the king he will put an apple on his seven-year-old son's head and shoot it off at 120 paces:

I have a sonne seven years old;
Hee is to me full deere;
I will tye him to a stake—
All shall see him that bee here—
And lay an apple upon his head,
And goe six [score] paces him froe,
And I myself with a broad arrowe
Shall cleave the apple in towe.

== Related stories ==
=== Hemingr Áslákson ===
In Hemings þáttr Áslákssonar in the Orkneyinga saga (about 1200), Harald Hardrada challenges the archer Hemingr to shoot a hazelnut off his younger brother Björn's head, which he does. There are two versions of this þáttr, one set in the Faroes, and in one Hemingr uses a spear to achieve the feat, rather than an arrow. Hemingr later takes revenge by shooting the king dead at the Battle of Stamford Bridge. There are also Norwegian and Faroese ballads on Hemingen unge.

=== Eindriði Pansa ===
One related story turns the motif on its head: after matching him in swimming and in other shooting contests, King Olaf of Norway converted Eindriði Pansa (the Splay-Footed) from heathenry by shooting at either a chess piece or a writing tablet on Eindriði's son's head. The king's shot narrowly missed but the boy was unharmed; Eindriði gave in to his mother's and sister's pleas and did not try the feat himself.

== Scholarly study ==
The motif was studied and written about as early as 1760 by Gottlieb Emmanuel von Haller and the pastor Simeon Uriel Freudenberger in a pamphlet in French and German with the title Der Wilhelm Tell, ein dänisches Mährgen (William Tell, a Danish Fable). During the 19th century, several scholars wrote about the internationalism of the motif. In 1834 Thomas Keightley noted the similarities between Palnatoki's and Tell's stories. There is a summary of the various versions in Jacob Grimm's Teutonic Mythology, and another in John Fiske's Myths and Myth-Makers. The most detailed precedes Child's edition of the ballad of "Adam Bell, Clim of the Clough, and William of Cloudesly."

In an 1877 book on the historicity of the William Tell legend, Ernst Ludwig Rochholz connects the similarity of the Tell legend to the stories of Egil and Palnatoki with legends of a migration from Sweden to Switzerland during the Middle Ages. He also adduces parallels in folktales among the Finns and the Lapps (Sami), and also from Norse mythology compares Ullr, called the "bow-god", Heimdall, and also Óðinn, who according to the Gesta Danorum Book 1, chapter 8.16, is said to have assisted Haddingus by shooting ten arrows from a crossbow in one shot, killing as many foes. Further comparing Indo-European and Oriental traditions, Rochholz concludes that the legend of the master marksman shooting an apple (or similar small target) was known outside the Germanic sphere and the adjacent regions (Finland and the Baltic) in India, Arabia, Persia and the Balkans (Serbia).

== See also ==
- Freischütz
- Death of Joan Vollmer

== Sources ==
- Helmut de Boor. "Die nordischen, englischen und deutschen Darstellungen des Apfelschussmotivs." Quellenwerk zur Entstehung der schweizerischen Eidgenossenschaft. III Chroniken III Anhang pp. 1–53. Aarau: Sauerländer, 1947. (in German)
- Roger E. Mitchell and Joyce P. Mitchell. "Schiller's William Tell: A Folkloristic Perspective." Journal of American Folklore 83 (1970) 44–52.
- Alan Dundes. "The Apple-Shot: Interpreting the Legend of William Tell." Western Folklore 50 (October 1991) 327–60. JSTOR. Reprinted in From Game to War and Other Psychoanalytic Essays on Folklore. Lexington, Kentucky: University Press of Kentucky, 1997. ISBN 0-8131-2031-4. pp. 46–77.
- Hemings þáttr Áslákssonar: An edition of texts from Flateyjarbók, Hrokkinskinna and Hauksbók. Ed. Gillian Fellows Jensen. Editiones Arnamagnæanæ series B. volume 3. Copenhagen: Munksgaard, 1962. OCLC 559417993.
- Th. Alwin. Henning Wulf, der ditmarsische Tell. Bonn: Heidelsmann, 1904. OCLC 250589189. (in German)
