= Petermann Etterlin =

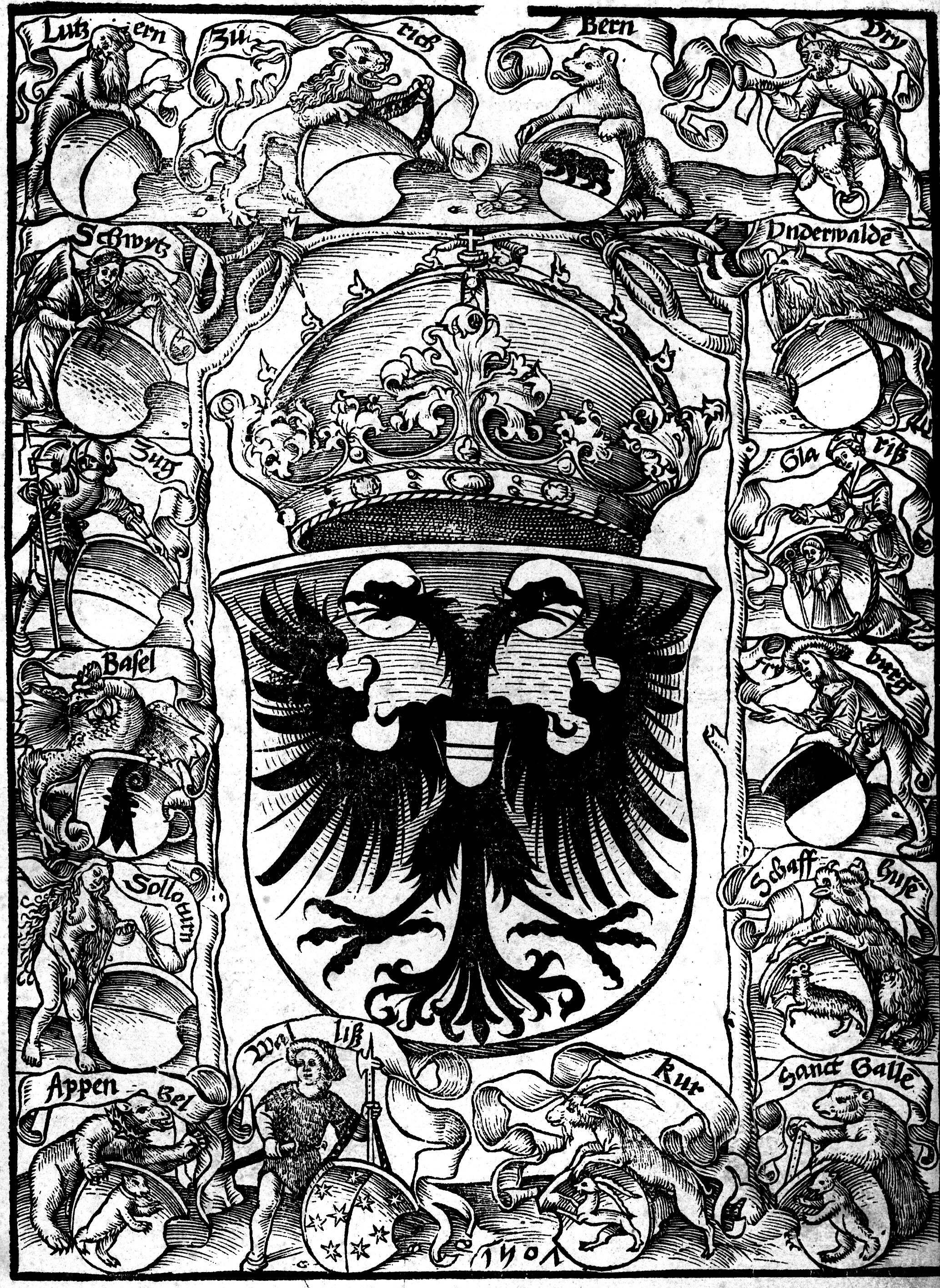
Chronicle's title page

Petermann Etterlin (c. 1430/40 – c. 1509) was born in Lucerne, Switzerland, as the son of Egloff Etterlin, who served as chronicler of the city of Lucerne from 1427 to 1453. Although his parents had destined him for an ecclesiastical career, Etterlin never became a clergyman. In 1464, Etterlin was appointed copyist of the city of Lucerne.

Etterlin’s military career began in 1468 when he joined the army of the Swiss Confederation at the siege of Waldshut. During a temporary exile from the city of Lucerne, Etterlin participated in the battles of Grandson, Murten and Nancy during the Burgundian Wars (Müller 397). In 1477, he was involved in a campaign against Lorraine.

After his return to his hometown in 1477, Etterlin was appointed the post of chancellor of the city of Lucerne. In 1495, after his promotion to the position of chronicler of the city of Lucerne, Etterlin joined the leading French-minded party. From 1493 to 1501, Etterlin is reported to have made several journeys to France.

Towards the end of his life, Etterlin embarked upon writing his Chronicle of the Swiss Confederation (German: Kronika von der loblichen Eydtgenossenschaft). According to Müller, Petermann Etterlin died in Lucerne in 1509, only two years after the completion of his monumental work.
