= Conrad Justinger =

14th-century chronicler

Conrad Justinger was a 14th-century chronicler who was probably born in Strasbourg.

Justinger, who had learned the trade of a chronicler in his home town, appears to have moved to the city of Bern in the last quarter of the 14th century. From 1390 until his death, Justinger served the city of Bern as a magistrate and notary public.

In 1388, Justinger copied Jakob Twinger von Königshofen’s treatise Computus Novus Chirometralis. Justinger’s handwriting furthermore appears in a number of chancellery documents of the city of Bern, such as the Udelbuch from 1390, the Satzungenbuch (German: ‘Statutes Book’) from 1398, the Freiheitenbuch (German: ‘Book of Liberties’) from 1431 as well as a Habsburg urbarium written after 1415. In 1420, Justinger, who was appointed chronicler of the city of Bern around 1400, was entrusted by the Bernese council to chronicle the history of his hometown. This chronicle, which Justinger completed in 1430, is known under the name of Bernese Chronicle (German: Chronik der Stadt Bern).

Conrad Justinger, whose name was frequently omitted in later publications of the Bernese Chronicle, probably died childless in April 1438. The original is lost, but a copy of the text survives in Jena. The original may have been illustrated; if so, that would make it the precursor of the late 15th century Swiss illustrated chronicles.
