= Bernese Chronicle =

1430 history of Bern by Conrad Justinger

The Bernese Chronicle (German: Chronik der Stadt Bern) contains information about the early history of the city of Bern, Switzerland.

The Bernese Chronicle was composed in 1430 by Conrad Justinger from Bern. According to Müller, Justinger was entrusted by the Bernese council under the chairmanship of its mayor Rudolf Hofmeister to chronicle the history of his hometown Bern from its foundation until the present time.

By Justinger's own account, the Bernese Chronicle is primarily based on documents that were stored in the archives of the city of Bern in the early 14th century. Furthermore, Justinger used the Narratio conflictus apud Laupen (Latin: ‘Narrative of the conflict at Laupen’) as well as the annals of the cathedral of Bern (Cronica de Berno) as sources for his chronicle.

Even if Justinger's monumental work appears to have been considerably influenced by older chronicles from Strasbourg, Basel, Konstanz and Zürich, researchers are generally agreed that the Bernese Chronicle constitutes the earliest record of the cruelties of the Habsburg governors towards the population of the Forest Cantons.

Justinger's Bernese Chronicle had a deep impact on the historiography of Switzerland. Although the original manuscript of the Bernese Chronicle is lost with the exception of 2½ leaves, its text has, nevertheless, been preserved in a single manuscript contained in the archive of the University of Jena.
