= Francis Kinloch =

Francis Kinloch may refer to:

- Sir Francis Kinloch, 1st Baronet (died 1691), Scottish politician
- Sir Francis Kinloch, 3rd Baronet (1676–1747), scion of a noble family
- Francis Kinloch (congressman) (1755–1826), American soldier and politician from South Carolina
