= Historiography of Switzerland =

Study of the history of Switzerland

The historiography of Switzerland is the study of the history of Switzerland.

Early accounts of the history of the Old Swiss Confederacy are found in the numerous Swiss chronicles of the 14th to 16th centuries. As elsewhere in Europe, these late medieval and early modern works were subjected to critical treatment with the emergence of modern historiography in the later 18th century.

Swiss historiographical scholarship of the postmodern era (late 20th century) also followed international trends in its emphasis on topical history, such as economic history, legal history and social history and Switzerland's conduct during World War II.

The first comprehensive historiography was Gottlieb Emanuel Haller's six-volume Bibliothek der Schweizergeschichte (1785–88), published still before the collapse of the Old Swiss Confederacy in the wake of the French Revolution. Later comprehensive treatments include Johannes von Müller's Geschichten Schweizerischer Eidgenossenschaft (1786–1806), Johannes Dierauer's Geschichte der Schweizerischen Eidgenossenschaft (1887–1917, with extensions up until 1974), the Handbuch der Schweizer Geschichte, (1972–77) and the Historical Dictionary of Switzerland (2002–2014).

== Swiss chronicles ==
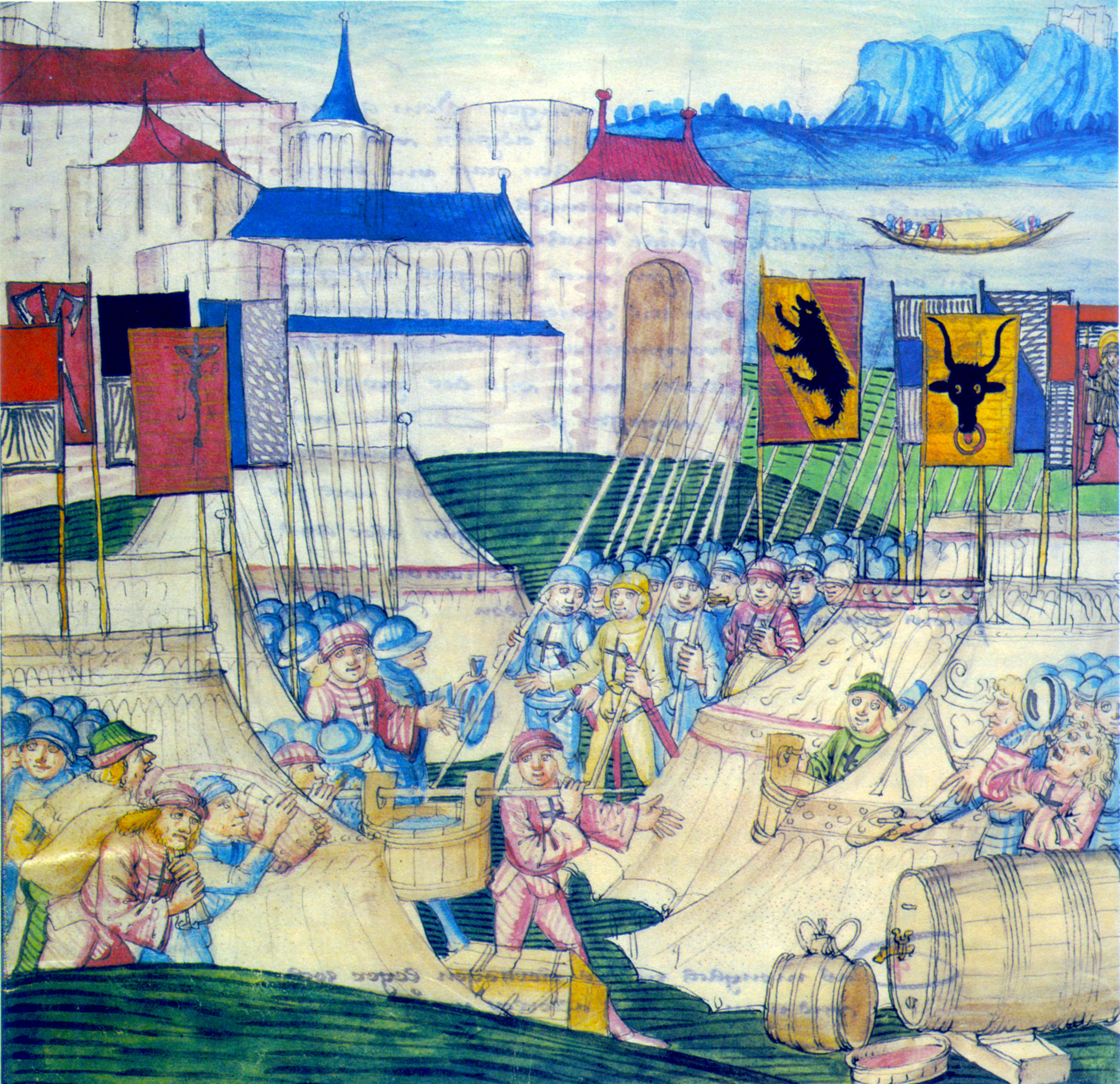
The Swiss loot the camp of Charles the Bold after the Battle of Grandson of 2 March 1476 (Berner Schilling, 1480s).

The earliest works of Swiss history are the battle songs and folk songs in which the earliest Confederates celebrated their deeds, as well as the Swiss chronicles written mostly in the 15th and 16th centuries, especially the illustrated chronicles produced in the late 15th and early 16th centuries on behalf of the authorities of the city-states of Bern and Lucerne. While these chronicles were written from the point of view of the individual states, even the earliest did address issues of all-Swiss significance in some detail.

With the introduction of movable type in Europe, chroniclers could reach a wider audience and begin to write about Swiss history as a whole. The 1507 Chronicle of the Swiss Confederation by Petermann Etterlin exerted great influence on later writers because, as a printed work, it was the first to be generally available.

== Early modern period ==
Humanist scholars such as Johannes Stumpf and Aegidius Tschudi connected the history of their time with the Roman era of Switzerland and to the accounts of the Helvetii, giving a greater depth to the emerging discipline of history in Switzerland.

This development came to a close with Josias Simler's 1576 De Helvetiorum republica libri duo, a sober account of the Confederacy's constitutional status and historical background. The work remained the definitive account of Swiss political history for centuries – it saw some 30 editions up until the 18th century, and was immediately translated into German and French. The rest of the world learnt of Swiss history essentially through Simler's treatise.

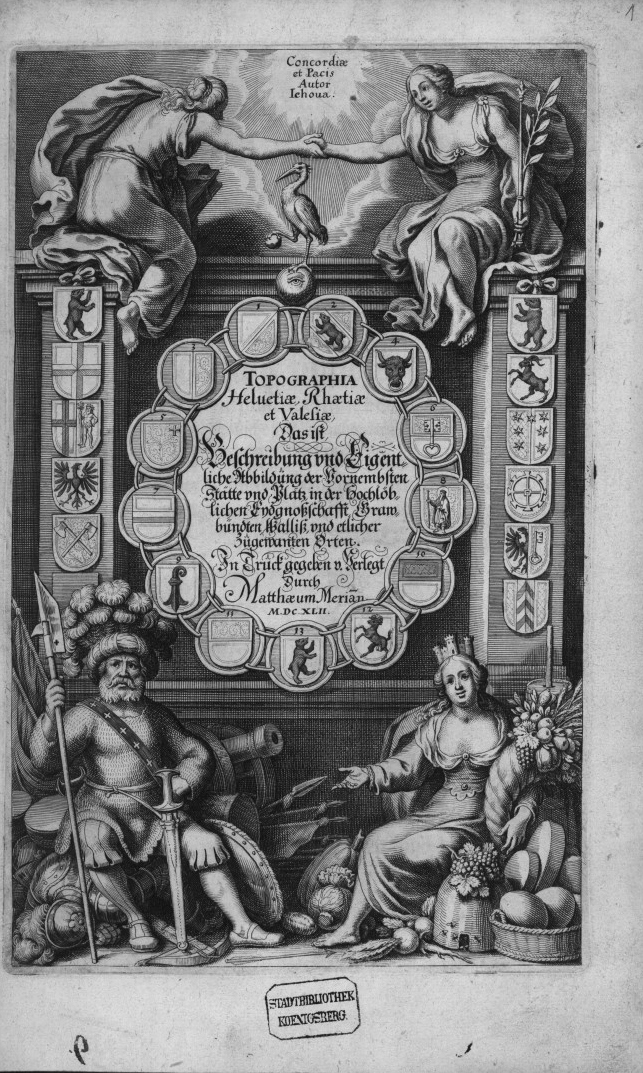
Title page of Merian's Topographia Helvetiae, Rhaetiae et Valesiae (1642, reprinted 1654).

As the Swiss city-states grew more stratified and oligarchical, and as confessional, social and political barriers became more pronounced, the 17th century saw a shift of focus in historical writing from the affairs of the Confederacy to that of the individual state. The continuation of the last great work of Swiss humanist historiography, Franz Guilliman's De rebus Helvetiorum sive antiquitatum, was thwarted by partisan politics. The baroque appetite for curiosa was allayed by Matthäus Merian's great engravings.

Historical research bloomed again in the time of the Enlightenment, when as early as with Johann Jakob Wagner's 1680 Historia naturalis Helvetiae curiosa, the spirit of critical inquiry took hold in Swiss scholarship. Conditions were not optimal – state archives remained mostly closed to private researchers and the zeitgeist favoured a heroic interpretation of history in a less than heroic present. Still, the early 18th century saw the first critical editions of ancient sources (by Johann Jakob Bodmer in 1735) and the publication of the first Swiss historical journals (Helvetische Bibliothek, also by Bodmer, and Mercure Helvétique, both in 1735). The century's most significant work of historiography was the country's first historical dictionary, the 20-volume Allgemeines helvetisches eidgenössisches Lexikon in 20 volumes (1743–63), written by scholars from all cantons and edited by Johann Jakob Leu.

The need for a historical overview was met by François-Joseph-Nicolas d'Alt de Tieffenthal's very patriotic Histoire des Hélvetiens (1749–53), Alexander Ludwig von Wattenwyl's prelude to Swiss criticism Histoire de la Confédération hélvetique (1754) and Vinzenz Bernhard Tscharner's Historie der Eidgenossen (1756–71). These works were complemented by treatises on the early history of Switzerland, the Reformation in Switzerland or Swiss military service abroad, as well as an increasing number of reports by foreign travelers in Switzerland. These works, in general, hewed closely to the received account of the foundation of the Old Swiss Confederacy as described in the Swiss chronicles of the 15th and 16th centuries.

== Modern historiography ==
=== Enlightenment and Napoleonic era ===
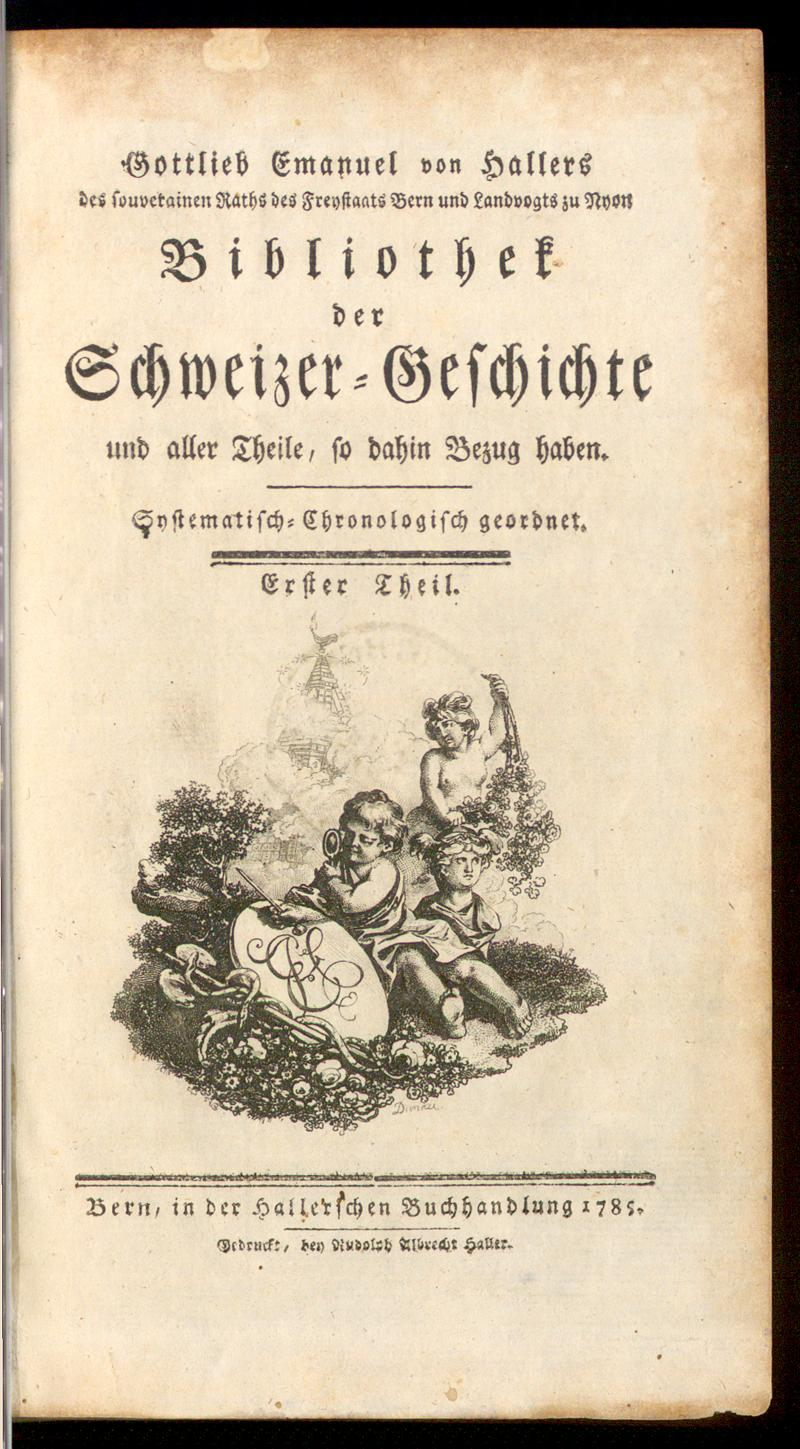
Title page of the first volume of von Haller's Bibliothek der Schweizer-Geschichte (1785).

When Bernese historians Gottlieb Emanuel Haller and Uriel Freudenberger first publicly questioned the historicity of William Tell, they triggered a political scandal and caused tensions between Bern and Tell's traditional home state, Uri. Their 1760 book Der Wilhelm Tell. Ein dänisches Mährgen, in which they showed the Tell saga to be an adaptation of a Danish legend, was banned and burnt in public. The first comprehensive historiography was Gottlieb Emanuel Haller's six-volume Bibliothek der Schweizergeschichte (1785–88).

The 19th century's most influential work of historiography was Johannes von Müller's epic and lively five-volume Geschichten Schweizerischer Eidgenossenschaft (1786–1806). It helped Switzerland, thrown into turmoil by Napoleon's violent overthrow of the Ancien Régime and the establishment of the short-lived Helvetic Republic, to find a sense of national identity and to refound the Confederation after Napoleon's fall.

The work, which did not go beyond the Swabian War of 1499 – Switzerland's war of independence – was soon continued in the works of an entire generation of historians. Robert Glutz von Blotzheim and Johann Jakob Hottinger in the German-speaking part of Switzerland as well as Louis Vuillemin and Charles Monnard in the Romandie translated and extended Müller's work, providing the new federal state founded in 1848 with a reasonably coherent common national history.

=== Popularization of history ===
In the period of historicism, learning from this national history became a general preoccupation, and dozens of works of popular history – notably by the educator Heinrich Zschokke and by the liberal historian André Daguet – were published to meet this demand. The democratic reforms of the 18th century caused a broadening of public education and the publication of innumerable historical textbooks.

Cantonal archives along with the new Federal Archives were opened to researchers, and chairs of Swiss history were established in Swiss universities. The first historical society in Switzerland was founded in 1841.

As the rationalist Enlightenment gave way to the more emotional period of Romanticism, the questioning of popular heroes grew more unpopular still, and the traditional account of Tell was reestablished for generations by Friedrich Schiller's play William Tell of 1804.

=== Late 19th to early 20th centuries ===
Von Müller's work was eventually supplanted by Johannes Dierauer's seminal Geschichte der Schweizerischen Eidgenossenschaft (1887–1917, with extensions up until 1974), which remains indispensable to modern research thanks to its thorough critical apparatus.

An important foundation for later research was laid in the later 19th century through the edition and publication of official documents, including those of the Old Confederacy and the Helvetic Republic, in voluminous series whose publication was not completed until 1966. This tradition is being continued in the ongoing publication of Swiss diplomatic archives by several Swiss universities starting in 1979.

With the 17th and 18th century seen by later 19th-century historians as uninteresting periods of stagnation, academic interest focused on the early history of Switzerland, whose discovery was aided by new archaeological methods, and, following European trends, on the medieval period and the Reformation. The conservative Roman Catholic cantons – who had been defeated in the 1847 Sonderbund War – also received little attention from scholars situated in the liberal Protestant mainstream of the time.

The early 20th century saw the publication of great topical histories of Switzerland, including Eugen Huber's legal history (Geschichte und System des schweizerischen Privatrechts, 1893), Andreas Heusler's constitutional history (Schweizer Verfassungsgeschichte, 1920; supplanted by Hans Conrad Peyer's Verfassungsgeschichte of 1978) and Paul Schweizer's diplomatic history (Geschichte der schweizerischen Neutralität, 1895; continued by Edgar Bonjour from 1946 on).

=== Later 20th century ===
On the whole, Swiss historiography up until the early 20th century was focused on the political and military history of Switzerland. The liberal, Radical intellectual mainstream, which viewed Swiss history as a steady progression of liberty culminating in the founding of the 1848 federal state, was dominant.

Some academic attention also shifted to the economic and social history of Switzerland, which began to be treated in substantial monographs by William Rappard and Eduard Fueter in the 1910s. These developments, inspired by Anglo-American historiographical trends, were however cut short by the World Wars. Attempts by non-historians including Robert Grimm to write a Socialist history of Switzerland had no impact.

On the other hand, apologists of the Ancien Régime such as Gonzague de Reynold, who praised the perceived enlighted authoritarianism of the Old Confederacy, left an imprint on the generally conservative historiography of the post-World War II generation. One historian, Karl Meyer, even attempted to rehabilitate the historicity of the national founding legends in a 1933 work. The early Cold War period's emphasis on geistige Landesverteidigung – "intellectual defense of the country" – did also not encourage a re-thinking of Swiss history.

It was only with the societal upheavals associated with the year 1968, which in Switzerland as elsewhere in the West began to move the mainstream of academic thought to the political Left, that the approach of Swiss historians began to shift again. Picking up where Rappard and Fueter had left off, historians of the 1960s and 1970s published large treatises on the social and economic history of Switzerland. Adapting the newer methods of historical research in the United States, the United Kingdom and France, researchers used disciplines such as historical demographics and ecology to support their work. Inspired by the Annales School, the postulate of "total history" – a comprehensive view of history aiming to understand long-term structures instead of explaining the current state of affairs – is now well-established in Swiss historiography.

== Contemporary works ==
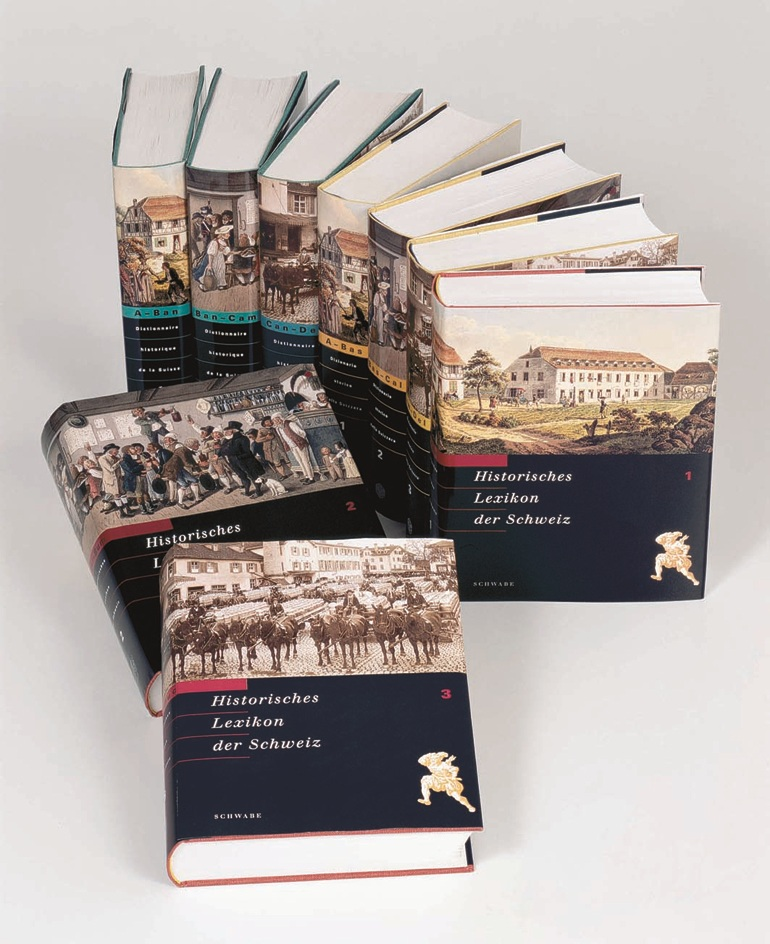
The first three volumes of the Historical Dictionary in each language.

Dierauer's seminal work of 1887–1917 was eventually supplanted as the leading work of Swiss historiography by the Handbuch der Schweizer Geschichte, a collaborative work of 1972–77, which remains largely rooted in the conservative mainstream of the early 1960s. A historians' "committee for a new history of Switzerland", avowedly following the new "total history" approach, published its three-volume Nouvelle histoire de la Suisse et des Suisses in 1982/83; a condensed one-volume edition (Geschichte der Schweiz und der Schweizer, last reprinted 2006) is currently the standard university textbook of Swiss history.

The principal ongoing project of Swiss historiography is the Historical Dictionary of Switzerland. It is also accessible online, as are more and more topical historical dictionaries, including SIKART (a biographical dictionary of Swiss artists) and the Culinary Heritage of Switzerland project (a historical encyclopedia of Swiss food).
