= Kinloch baronets of Gilmerton (1686) =

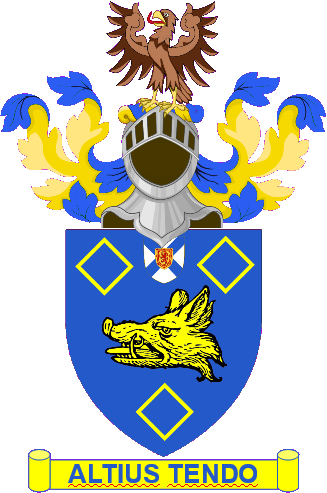
- Crest: An eagle rising proper.
- Shield: Azure a boar’s head erased between three mascles Or
- Motto: Altius Tendo

The Kinloch baronetcy, of Gilmerton in the County of Haddington, was created in the Baronetage of Nova Scotia on 16 September 1686 for Francis Kinloch, a former Lord Provost of Edinburgh, and Member of the Parliament of Scotland for Edinburghshire in 1678. His eldest son and successor, Sir Francis Kinloch, 2nd Baronet, married Mary, second daughter of David Leslie, Lord Newark.

The 11th Baronet was a Brigadier-General in the British Army and served in the Second Anglo-Boer War and the First World War.

The family seat is Gilmerton House, North Berwick, East Lothian.

== Kinloch baronets, of Gilmerton (1686) ==
- Sir Francis Kinloch, 1st Baronet (died 1691)
- Sir Francis Kinloch, 2nd Baronet (died 1699)
- Sir Francis Kinloch, 3rd Baronet (1676–1747)
- Sir James Kinloch, 4th Baronet (1705–1778)
- Sir David Kinloch, 5th Baronet (c. 1710–1795)
- Sir Francis Kinloch, 6th Baronet (c. 1747–1795), shot by his brother the 7th Baronet.
- Sir Archibald Gordon Kinloch, 7th Baronet (died 1800), tried for the murder of 6th Baronet in 1795, acquitted as insane.
- Sir Alexander Kinloch, 8th Baronet (died 1813)
- Sir David Kinloch, 9th Baronet (1805–1879)
- Sir Alexander Kinloch, 10th Baronet (1830–1912)
- Sir David Alexander Kinloch, 11th Baronet (1856–1944)
- Sir Alexander Davenport Kinloch, 12th Baronet (1902–1982)
- Sir David Kinloch, 13th Baronet (born 1951)

The heir apparent is the present holder's son Alexander Kinloch, Younger of Gilmerton (b. 1978).
