= Diana Vreeland =

American fashion columnist and editor (1903–1989)

- Vreeland in 1979, by Horst P. Horst
- Born: Diana Dalziel; September 29, 1903; Paris, France
- Died: August 22, 1989 (aged 85); New York City, U.S.
- Occupations: Magazine editor; fashion journalist
- Years active: 1936–1989
- Employer(s): Hearst Corporation and Condé Nast Publications
- Agent: Irving Paul Lazar
- Title: Editor-in-chief of Vogue
- Term: 1963–1971
- Predecessor: Jessica Daves
- Successor: Grace Mirabella
- Spouse: Thomas Reed Vreeland (m. 1924; died 1966)
- Children: 2, including Frederick Vreeland
- Mother: Emily Hoffman
- Relatives: Nicholas Vreeland (grandson); Pauline de Rothschild (cousin)
- Awards: Chevalier of the Légion d'honneur (1976); Chevalier of the Ordre des Arts et des Lettres (1970)
- Website: www.dianavreeland.com

Diana Vreeland (September 29, 1903 – August 22, 1989) was an American fashion columnist and editor. She worked for the fashion magazine Harper's Bazaar and as editor-in-chief at Vogue, later becoming a special consultant to the Costume Institute of the Metropolitan Museum of Art. She was named on the International Best Dressed List Hall of Fame in 1964. Vreeland coined the term youthquake in 1965.

== Early life ==
Born Diana Dalziel in Paris in 1903, she lived at 5 avenue du Bois-de-Boulogne (known as Avenue Foch post-World War I). Vreeland was the eldest daughter of an American socialite mother, Emily Key Hoffman, and a British stockbroker father, Frederick Young Dalziel. Hoffman was a descendant of George Washington's brother, as well as a cousin of Francis Scott Key. She was also a distant cousin of writer and socialite Pauline de Rothschild (née Potter). Vreeland had one younger sister, Alexandra (1907-1999), who later married Sir Alexander Davenport Kinloch, 12th Baronet (1902–1982). Their daughter Emily Lucy Kinloch married Lt.-Col. Hon. Hugh Waldorf Astor (1920–1999), the second son of John Jacob Astor, 1st Baron Astor of Hever and his wife, Lady Violet Mary Elliot-Murray-Kynynmound.

Vreeland's family immigrated to the United States at the outbreak of World War I, moving to 15 East 77th Street on the Upper East Side of Manhattan, New York City, where they became prominent society figures. Vreeland was sent to dancing school as a pupil of Michel Fokine, the only Imperial Ballet master ever to leave Russia, and later of Louis Harvy Chalif. She performed in Anna Pavlova's Gavotte at Carnegie Hall. In January 1922, she was featured in the pages of her future magazine, Vogue, in a roundup of socialites and their cars. The story read, "Such motors as these accelerate the social whirl. Miss Diana Dalziel, one of the most attractive debutantes of the winter, is shown entering her Cadillac."

On March 1, 1924, Diana Dalziel married Thomas Reed Vreeland (1899–1966), a banker and international financier, at St. Thomas Church in New York. The couple had two sons: Tim (Thomas Reed Vreeland, Jr.) born 1925, who became an architect, as well as a professor of architecture at the University of New Mexico and then UCLA, and Frecky (Frederick Dalziel Vreeland), born 1927, who would become U.S. ambassador to Morocco. A week before Diana's wedding, The New York Times reported that her mother had been named co‑respondent in the divorce proceedings of Sir Charles Ross and his second wife, Patricia. The ensuing scandal estranged Vreeland from her mother, who died in September 1927 in Nantucket, Massachusetts.

After the Vreelands' honeymoon, they moved to Brewster, New York, where they raised their two sons and remained until 1929, when they relocated to 17 Hanover Terrace, Regent's Park, London, previously the home of Wilkie Collins and Edmund Gosse. In London, she danced with the Tiller Girls and met Cecil Beaton, who became a lifelong friend. Like Syrie Maugham and Elsie de Wolfe, society women who ran their own boutiques, Diana operated a lingerie business near Berkeley Square. Her clients included Wallis Simpson and Mona Williams. She often visited Paris, where she would buy her clothes, mostly from Chanel, whom she had met in 1926. She was one of fifteen American women presented to King George V and Queen Mary at Buckingham Palace on May 18, 1933. In 1935, her husband's job brought them back to New York, where they lived for the remainder of their lives.

As Vreeland would later recall, "Before I went to work for Harper's Bazaar, in 1936, I had been leading a wonderful life in Europe. That meant traveling, seeing beautiful places, having marvelous summers, studying and reading a great deal of the time."

A biographical documentary of Vreeland, The Eye has to Travel, debuted in September 2012 at the Angelika Theater in New York City.

== Career ==
=== Harper's Bazaar 1936–1962 ===
Vreeland began her publishing career in 1936 as columnist for the women's luxury fashion magazine Harper's Bazaar. Its editor, Carmel Snow, had been so impressed with Vreeland's style and attire that she asked her to work at the magazine. From 1936 until her resignation, Diana Vreeland ran a column for Harper's Bazaar called "Why Don't You...?,"full of random, imaginative suggestions. For example, she wrote, "Why don't you...Turn your child into an Infanta for a fancy-dress party?" According to Vreeland, "The one that seemed to draw the most attention was [...] "[Why Don't You] [w]ash your blond child's hair in dead champagne, as they do in France?" Vreeland says that S. J. Perelman's subsequent parody of it for The New Yorker magazine outraged her then-editor, Carmel Snow.

Vreeland "discovered" the then-unknown Lauren Bacall during World War II. The Harper's Bazaar cover for March 1943 shows the newly minted model (not yet a Hollywood star) Lauren Bacall, posing near a Red Cross office. Vreeland directed the shoot, later describing the image as "an extraordinary photograph, in which Bacall is leaning against the outside door of a Red Cross blood donor room. She wears a chic suit, gloves, a cloche hat with long waves of hair falling from it". Ever focused on fashion, Vreeland commented in 1946 that "[T]he bikini is the most important thing since the atom bomb". Disdainful of the typical approach to dressing in the United States in the 1940s, she detested "strappy high-heel shoes" and the "crêpe de chine dresses" that women wore even in the heat of the summer in the countryside.

Until her resignation from Harper's Bazaar, she worked closely with Louise Dahl-Wolfe, Richard Avedon, Nancy White, and Alexey Brodovitch. She became the magazine's Fashion Editor. Richard Avedon recalled when he first met her, at Harper's Bazaar, she "looked up at me for the first time and said, 'Aberdeen, Aberdeen, doesn't it make you want to cry?' Well, it did. I went back to Carmel Snow and said, 'I can't work with that woman. She calls me Aberdeen.' Carmel Snow said, 'You're going to work with her.' And I did, to my enormous benefit, for almost 40 years." Avedon said at the time of her death that "she was and remains the only genius fashion editor".

In 1955, the Vreelands moved to a new apartment, which Diana had Billy Baldwin decorate entirely in red. She said, "I want this place to look like a garden, but a garden in hell". Regular attendees at the parties the Vreelands threw were socialite C. Z. Guest, composer Cole Porter, and British photographer Cecil Beaton. Paramount's 1957 movie musical Funny Face featured a character—Maggie Prescott as portrayed by Kay Thompson—based on Vreeland.

In 1960, John F. Kennedy became president and Vreeland advised First Lady Jacqueline Kennedy in matters of style. "Vreeland advised Jackie throughout the campaign and helped connect her with fashion designer Oleg Cassini, who became chief designer to the first lady". "I can remember Jackie Kennedy, right after she moved into the White House...It wasn't even like a country club, if you see what I mean--plain." Vreeland occasionally gave Mrs. Kennedy advice about clothing during her husband's administration, and small advice about what to wear on Inauguration Day in 1961.

In spite of being extremely successful, Diana Vreeland was paid a relatively small salary by the Hearst Corporation, which owned Harper's Bazaar. Vreeland said that she was paid $18,000 a year from 1936 with a $1,000 raise, finally, in 1959. She speculated that newspaper magnate William Randolph Hearst's castle in San Simeon, California, "must have been where the Hearst money went".

=== Vogue 1962–1971 ===
According to some sources, hurt that she was passed over for promotion at Harper's Bazaar in 1957, she joined Vogue in 1962. She was editor-in-chief from 1963 until 1971. Vreeland enjoyed the 1960s enormously because she felt that uniqueness was being celebrated. "If you had a bump on your nose, it made no difference so long as you had a marvelous body and good carriage."

In December 1962 Rudi Gernreich first conceived of a topless swimsuit, but he didn't intend to produce the design commercially. It had more meaning to Gernreich as an idea than as a reality. Gernreich had Peggy Moffitt model the suit in person for Vreeland, who asked him why he conceived of the design. Gernreich told her he felt it was time for "freedom—in fashion as well as every other facet of life," but that the swimsuit was just a statement. "[Women] drop their bikini tops already," he said, "so it seemed like the natural next step." She told him, "If there's a picture of it, it's an actuality. You must make it." Gernreich did, and he decided to call his design a monokini.

Vreeland sent memos to her staff urging them to be creative. One said, "Today let's think pig white! Wouldn't it be wonderful to have stockings that were pig white! The color of baby pigs, not quite white and not quite pink!" During her tenure at the magazine, she discovered the sixties "youthquake" star Edie Sedgwick. In 1984, Vreeland explained how she saw fashion magazines. "What these magazines gave was a point of view. Most people haven't got a point of view; they need to have it given to them—and what's more, they expect it from you. [...][I]t must have been 1966 or '67. I published this big fashion slogan: This is the year of do it yourself. [...][E]very store in the country telephoned to say, 'Look, you have to tell people. No one wants to do it themselves—they want direction and to follow a leader!'"

She notoriously went over budget each issue. However, she was not someone known to compromise. If she was going to be editor-in-chief at Vogue, she would not skimp on her ideas no matter the cost, man-power, or obscurity. Then in 1971, like a large wooden door swinging closed, silencing a steady wind, Vreeland was let go from her position as editor-chief of Vogue. She was chronically over-budget and, though good-natured, a tyrant in the office.

=== The Metropolitan Museum of Art ===
After she was fired from Vogue, she became consultant to the Costume Institute of the Metropolitan Museum of Art in New York in 1971. By 1984, according to Vreeland's account, she had organized twelve exhibitions. Artist Greer Lankton created a life-size portrait doll of Vreeland that is on display in the Costume Institute's library.

== Later years ==
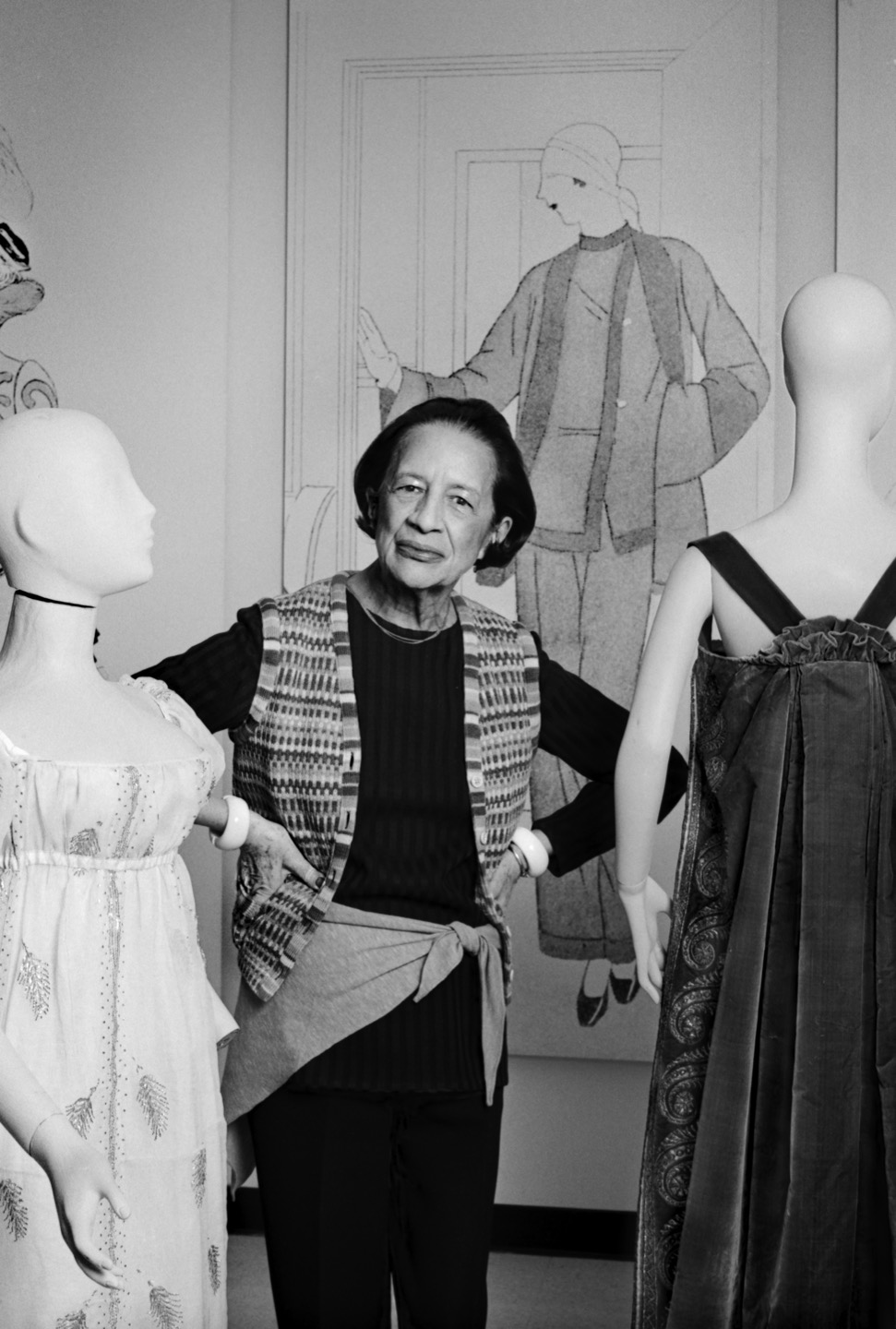
Diana Vreeland photographed in New York City 1978 by Lynn Gilbert

In 1984, Vreeland wrote her autobiography, D.V.

In 1989, she died of a heart attack at age 85 at Lenox Hill Hospital, on Manhattan's Upper East Side in New York City.

== Diana Vreeland Estate ==
The Diana Vreeland Estate is administered by her grandson, Alexander Vreeland, Frederick's son. The responsibility was given to him by her sons, Fredrick and Tim. The official Diana Vreeland website was launched in September 2011. Created and overseen by her estate, DianaVreeland.com is dedicated to her work and career, presenting her accomplishments and influence, and revealing how and why she achieved her notoriety and distinction.

== Film portrayals ==
Vreeland was portrayed in the film Infamous (2006) by Juliet Stevenson. She was also portrayed in the film Factory Girl (2006) by Illeana Douglas. Her life was documented in Diana Vreeland: The Eye Has to Travel (2011).

Diana Vreeland Parfums is featured in the opening scene of Ocean's 8.

== References in media and pop culture ==
Literature:

- 2011: In the book Damned by Chuck Palahniuk, the main character (Madison Spencer) receives a pair of high heels from the character Babette.
- 2025: In Fiona Davis's novel The Stolen Queen, fictional character Annie Jenkins encounters Vreeland at the Costume Institute of the Metropolitan Museum of Art and is offered a job as her assistant shortly before the Met Gala in 1978. Vreeland's all-red, "garden-in-hell" apartment also makes an appearance.

Theater and musicals:

- 1941: In the musical Lady in the Dark by Moss Hart, Kurt Weill, and Ira Gershwin, the character of Alison Du Bois was based on Vreeland.
- 1996: Mary Louise Wilson portrayed Vreeland in a one-woman play called Full Gallop, which she co-wrote with Mark Hampton. It was revied at London's Hampstead Theatre in 2008.

Film:

- 1957: Maggie Prescott, a fashion magazine editor in Funny Face (1957) is loosely based on Diana Vreeland.
- 1966: In Who Are You, Polly Maggoo?, Miss Maxwell (Grayson Hall) portrays an extravagant American expatriate fashion magazine editor the director confirmed was modeled on Vreeland.
- 1995: In To Wong Foo, Thanks for Everything! Julie Newmar, Vida Boheme (Patrick Swayze) gives a copy of Vreeland's autobiography to a thrift-store clerk and tells him to "commit sections to memory", which he does.
- 2023: The documentary Donyale Luna: Supermodel includes a Vreeland letter from Richard Avendon's archive.

Television:

- 2016: Robbie Turner impersonated Vreeland in the Snatch Game on Season 8.
- 2022: Raja Gemini impersonated Vreeland in the Snatch Game on Season 7 of All Stars.

Print/journalism:

- 1980: Vreeland was profiled in an article about social climbing in The New Yorker.
- 1982: Bruce Chatwin wrote a memoir piece, "At Dinner with Diana Vreeland", about a dinner conversation with her.

== See also ==
- Monk with a Camera, a film about Nicholas Vreeland, who is Diana Vreeland's grandson.

Media offices
| Preceded by Jessica Daves | Editor of American Vogue; 1963–1971 | Succeeded by Grace Mirabella |
