= Emily Hoffman =

American socialite

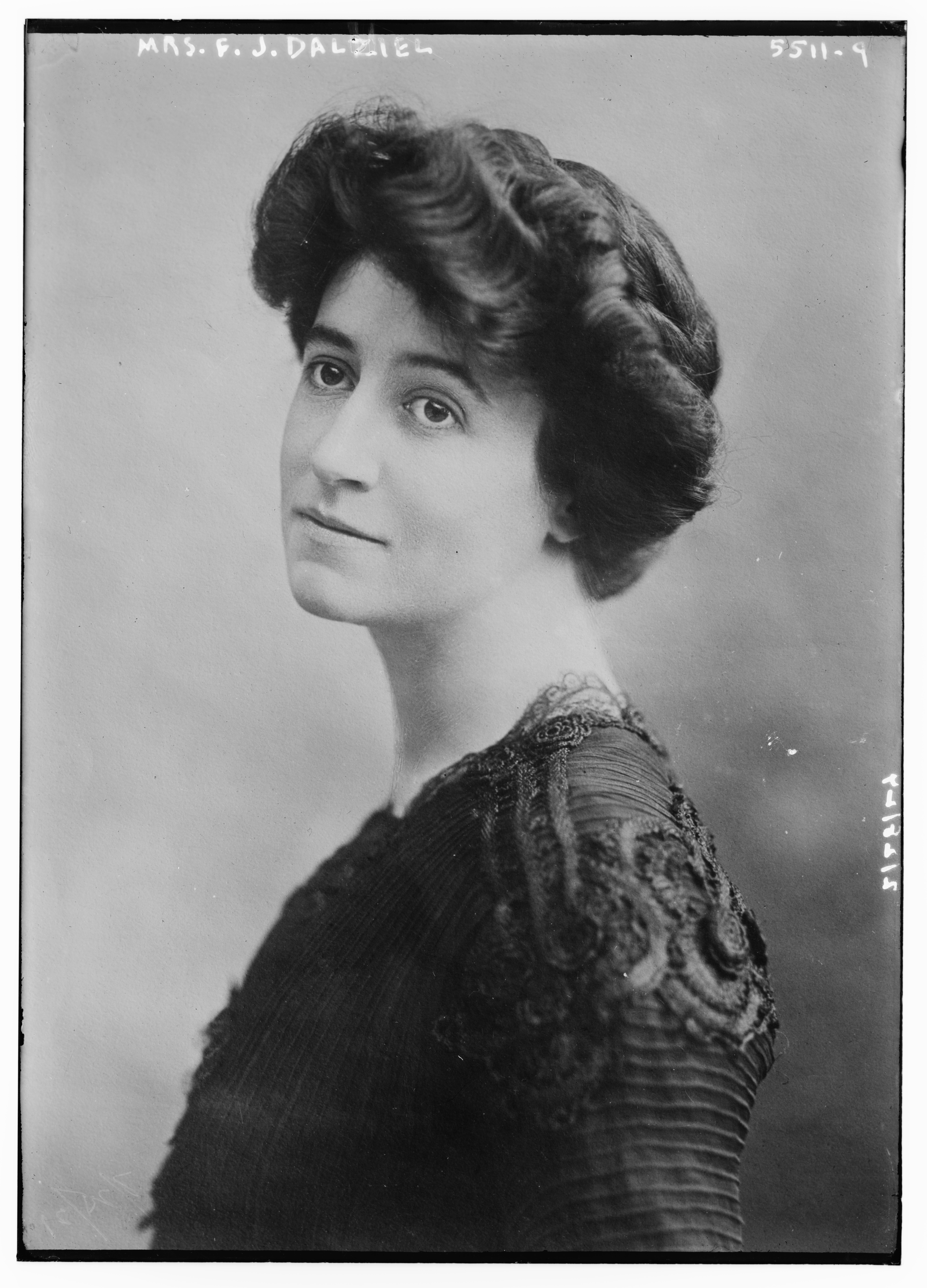
- Hoffman in 1900
- Born: Emily Key Hoffman; 1876; New York City, New York, U.S.
- Died: September 12, 1927 (aged 50–51); Nantucket, Massachusetts, U.S.
- Education: Brearley School
- Occupations: socialite, dancer, sportswoman
- Spouse: Frederick Young Dalziel (m. 1901)
- Children: 2, including Diana Vreeland
- Relatives: Philip Barton Key (great-grandfather)

Emily Key Hoffman, known upon her marriage as Mrs. F. Y. Dalziel, (1876 – September 12, 1927) was an American socialite, heiress, dancer, and big-game hunter. A prominent debutante of the Gilded Age, she was a leading figure in New York and Newport high society. Hoffman was an accomplished amateur dancer and performed Spanish dances at various social events. Dubbed "the Carmencita of New York society", one of her performances in 1900 at the Waldorf-Astoria earned her a standing ovation and an invitation from Lew Fields and Joe Weber to perform on Broadway, an offer she declined due to the rigid expectations for women of her social class.

After marrying British financier Frederick Young Dalziel in 1901, Hoffman lived the life of an expatriate socialite in Paris during the Belle Époque. She returned to the United States shortly before the outbreak of World War I. An avid big-game hunter, she went on hunting expeditions in the Western United States and in Eastern Africa. She hunted grizzly bears, lions, rhinoceroses, and hippopotamuses. On one hunting trip she was nearly killed by a charging rhinoceros, but was saved when Sir Charles Ross, 9th Baronet, fatally shot the animal.

Hoffman was the mother of Vogue editor-in-chief Diana Vreeland and of Alexandra, Lady Kinloch.

== Early life and family ==
Emily Key Hoffman was born in 1876 to the lawyer George H. Hoffmann and his wife, Mary Martin Ellis. Both of her parents were members of prominent families with roots in Colonial Virginia and Maryland that were part of the planter class. On her father's side, she was a relative of the Key family of Maryland and a cousin of Francis Scott Key. Her paternal great-grandfather was Philip Barton Key, a chief justice and U.S. congressman. Her paternal great-great-grandfather was Governor George Plater of Maryland. On her mother's side, Hoffman was a relative of the Washington family, descending from one of George Washington's brothers. Her maternal grandfather, John Washington Ellis, made a fortune as a partner of a wholesale dry goods firm in Cincinnati, and was a co-founder of the First National Bank of Cincinnati.

Hoffman's family was recognized as part of Caroline Schermerhorn Astor's The Four Hundred, an elite group of New York high society during the Gilded Age. In 1886 they were added to the Social Register. Hoffman grew up in wealth and privilege at her family's home on West Fiftieth Street in Manhattan, just off of Fifth Avenue, and at their summer "cottage", called Stone Acre, on Bellevue Avenue in Newport, Rhode Island, which was built by her grandfather in 1882. Hoffman's father died in 1885, after which she was reared by her widowed mother. At the age of sixteen, she was sent to Brearley School to complete her education.

== Adult life ==
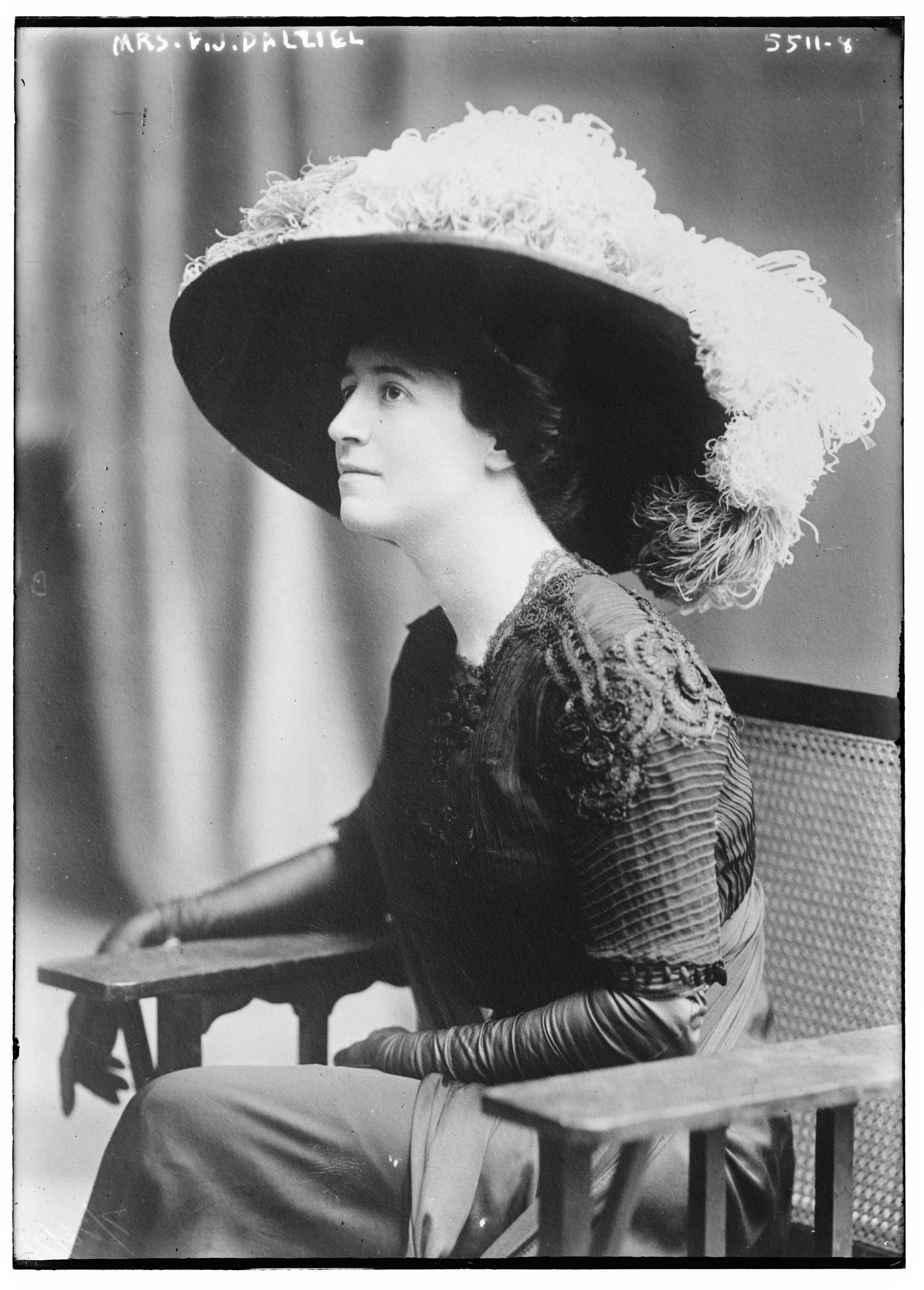
Mrs. F. Y. Dalziel in 1900

In 1895 newspaper columnists wrote that Hoffman was "the most beautiful young lady on the floor" at the Newport ball given by Alva Vanderbilt for Charles Spencer-Churchill, 9th Duke of Marlborough. She was presented as a debutante to New York society in 1896 and was regarded as one of the "most beautiful Belles of Newport" after her formal debut. Hoffman was a great success of the social season, appearing on the guests lists of dinner parties and dances, including Mrs. Astor's annual ball and a Bailey's Beach party hosted by Marion Graves Anthon Fish. Swiss artist Adolfo Müller-Ury painted a portrait of Hoffman posed as the Madonna, which led to her being described as the "Madonna of the 400". The portrait was on exhibition at Paul Durand-Ruel's gallery on Fifth Avenue from March 1 to March 15, 1897. The portrait was possibly purchased by railway executive James J. Hill.

In 1898 she went to Italy for the season in Rome, where she was considered a great success. Hoffman was a sportswoman and enjoyed hunting, riding, and tennis. She was also an accomplished dancer. She was celebrated as high society's "exponent of Spanish dances" and was dubbed "the Carmencita of New York society" by the press. She was known for her performances of the cachucha, especially at a charity event at the Waldorf-Astoria in January 1900 that earned her a standing ovation, fan-mail, and glowing reviews in New York newspapers. She was reportedly offered the opportunity to perform her dances on Broadway by Lew Fields and Joe Weber— an invitation she declined due to the societal expectations of a woman of her class.

While many other American debutantes, such as her colleague Consuelo Vanderbilt, were pressured to marry European aristocrats, Hoffman seemed uninterested in finding a successful match. By 1899 she joined a group of Bohemians called the Carbonites, that was led by James L. Breese, and counted social figures such as Stanford White among its members. In November 1900 Hoffman sailed to the Mediterranean aboard Eugene Higgins' yacht Varuna. At the time, she was romantically linked to Higgins and also had a rift with her mother, who had recently married Charles Gouverneur Weir. In September 1901, six months after the Varuna docked in Nice, Hoffman became engaged to Frederick Young Dalziel, a Scottish stockbroker. Although Oxford-educated, Dalziel was from a lower social class, much to the disapproval of Hoffman's mother. On September 28, 1901, Hoffman married Dalziel at St Peter's Church, Eaton Square in London. She and her husband honeymooned in the South of France. They had two daughters: Diana, who became editor-in-chief of Vogue, and Alexandra, who married Sir Alexander Davenport Kinloch, 12th Baronet. Hoffman inherited fortunes from both of her parents. She and her family lived abroad, mainly in London and in Paris at 5 Avenue du Bois de Boulogne. At the outbreak of World War I, she and her family emigrated back to the United States and lived at 15 East 77th Street, a townhouse on the Upper East Side of Manhattan.

Hoffman was an accomplished big game hunter, going on trips to the American frontier to hunt grizzly bears and to Africa to hunt exotic animals. In 1921, Hoffman returned to the United States from East Africa with an elephant, two rhinoceros, seven lions, three hippopotamuses among her hunting trophies. On another hunting expedition in Africa, Hoffman was charged by a rhinoceros. She was saved when a friend, Sir Charles Ross, 9th Baronet, shot and killed the animal. After a trip to Africa for a safari in early 1927, Hoffman was cited as a co-respondent in a divorce case there.

She died from pneumonia on September 12, 1927.
