= Joggle =

Joggle means to shake to and fro, to rock something about, and can be used both transitively and intransitively in several ways, including:

- to joggle along, walk along with short, jerky movements (Oxford English Dictionary, 2003)
- Joggle (architecture), a joint or projection that interlocks blocks
- Joggle bending, a type of offset bend in construction.
- Joggling, a pastime (and competitive sport) that combines juggling and jogging.
- Joggling board, a type of bouncy furniture.
- Joggling (pottery), a method of pot decoration.
- "Joggle Along", a Cornish children's game, (The Folk-lore Journal Vol. 57, 1888), sung to a nursery rhyme of the same name.
