= Kinloch baronets of Kinloch (2nd creation, 1873) =

Escutcheon of the Kinloch baronets of Kinloch

The Kinloch baronetcy, of Kinloch in the County of Perth, was created in the Baronetage of the United Kingdom on 16 April 1873 for George Kinloch. He was the son of George Kinloch: see the 1685 creation for background.

The 2nd Baronet sat as Member of Parliament for Perthshire East from 1889 to 1903.

== Kinloch baronets, of Kinloch (1873) ==
- Sir George Kinloch, 1st Baronet (1800–1881)
- Sir John George Smyth Kinloch, 2nd Baronet (1849–1910)
- Sir George Kinloch, 3rd Baronet (1880–1948)
- Sir John Kinloch, 4th Baronet (1907–1992)
- Sir David Oliphant Kinloch, 5th Baronet(1942–2022)
- Sir Alexander Peter Kinloch, 6th Baronet (born 1986)

The heir apparent is the present holder's son Ivor Oliphant Kinloch, (born 2020).
