= Joggling board =

Type of bouncy furniture

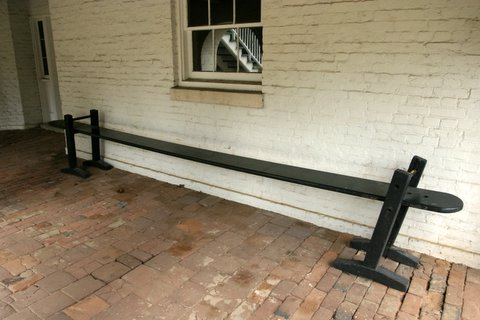
A joggling board found at the Robert Mills House in Columbia, SC.

A joggling or jostling board is a long, pliable board that is supported on each end by wooden stands. The board is springy and a person sitting on it can easily bounce up and down. Sources differ on the origin; its usage in the Lowcountry of South Carolina around Charleston in the early 19th century is, however, rather well-documented.

Traditionally, it is painted Charleston green. The joggling board's popularity has slowly been coming back, mostly as decorations on lawns and front porches.

Martha Graham bought several joggling boards from Old Charleston Joggling Board Co. on a visit to Charleston and used them as props in her dance Maple Leaf Rag. Photos from the rehearsals show the variety of ways the board was used. The company posed with Graham on these boards for the New York Times.

== Construction ==
The main board preferably should be between 10 and 16 feet (3 to 5 meters) long and wide enough to sit on. Traditionally the boards were made from the flexible wood of a southern yellow pine tree. The end pieces, which are often shaped similar to a rocking chair to facilitate rocking side to side, hold the main board at sitting height.

== History ==
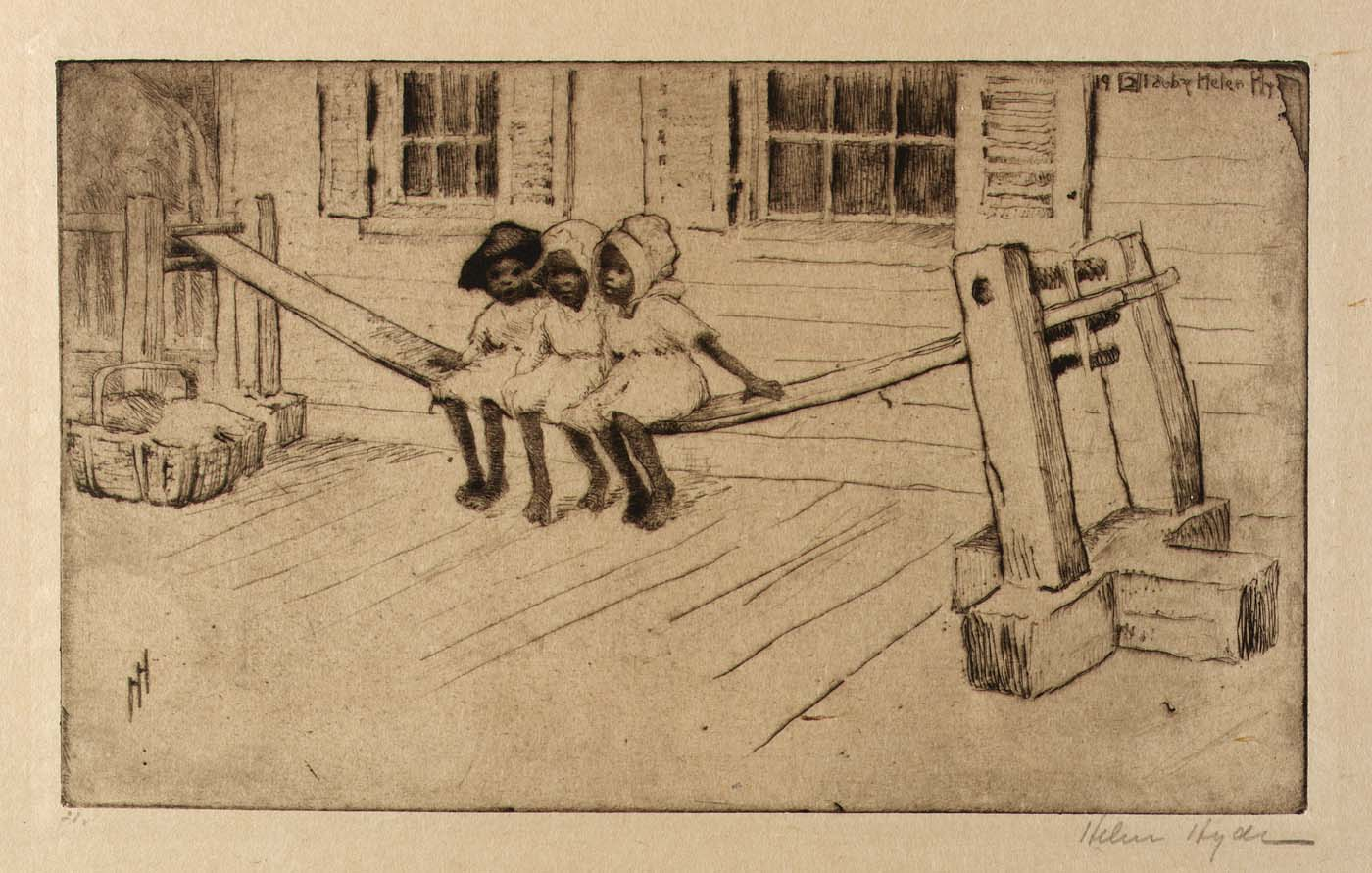
1918 depiction of a joggling board

According to one South Carolina legend, the first joggling board was built in the early 19th century at Old Fields Plantation, which was located in the "Midlands" of South Carolina, near Edgefield in Edgefield County; it is maintained that it was constructed with reference to the design of a model shipped to the plantation owner's sister by relatives at the family estate of Gilmerton House in Scotland, and originally developed for exercise purposes.
