= Sir Archibald Gordon Kinloch, 7th Baronet =

Scottish baronet

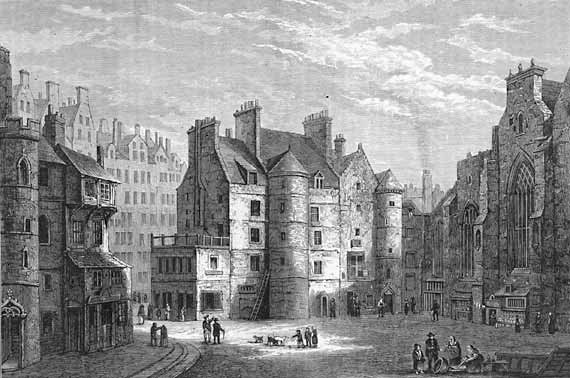
The Edinburgh Tolbooth where Kinloch was imprisoned

Sir Archibald Gordon Kinloch of Gilmerton (c. 1749 – 1800) was a Scottish baronet who, in one of the most celebrated cases in late 18th century Britain, killed his elder brother, Sir Francis Kinloch, 6th baronet of Gilmerton. In the approach to the tragic events (and during the trial) he was known by his military title of Major Alexander Gordon Kinloch (close acquaintances call him Major Gordon). Through the greatest of ironies, due to the murder, Kinloch was thereafter entitled "Sir". It has wrongly been considered one of the first recorded instances of diminished responsibility due to mental instability. Kinloch was acquitted by reason of insanity. The case also set parameters for the use and validity of notes taken by witnesses in use as testimony.

He therefore became a baronet on 16 April 1795 the day of his victim's death. The entirety of his baronetcy was spent either in prison or under house arrest, neither being a barrier to his legal rights to the title of Baronet.

His trial included many prominent legal and medical persons of late 18th century Edinburgh society.

== Life ==
He was the son of Sir David Kinloch, 5th baronet of Gilmerton (1710–1795) (son of Sir Francis Kinloch, 3rd Baronet) and his wife Harriet Cockburn (d. 1757) daughter of Sir Archibald Cockburn, an advocate. His year of birth is unclear, but as the younger brother of Sir Francis Kinloch (b. 1747) is presumed to be around 1749.

He served as an ensign in the 65th Regiment in Ireland in 1767 and there befriended the much older Major John MacKay, who remained a lifelong friend. In 1773 he joined his regiment in Halifax, Nova Scotia. In 1778 he was a captain in the 65th Regiment based in Coxheath, Nova Scotia. During this stay he befriended Lt (later Lt Col) Samuel Twentyman of the 18th Regiment. In the autumn of 1779 Archibald was promoted to major, and Twentyman joined his regiment in sailing to the West Indies.

In 1779/1780 Archibald spent much time in St. Lucia in the West Indies and together with several thousand others (many of whom died) caught a fever (generally called St. Lucia Fever), after which his disposition changed greatly, to the concern of all his family. He is recorded (at an unclear date) of having been once confined to the Edinburgh Bedlam for insanity. His mood was said to worsen with alcohol. In 1783 Twentyman remet him in Lincoln and considered him much changed. Major MacKay met him in London in the same year and was of the same opinion. In 1785 MacKay met him again, also meeting his father Sir David Kinloch and ill-fated brother, Francis, all on a visit to a Mr and Mrs Dalrymple of North Berwick for an evening of whist.

In September 1789, back in Scotland, he is noted in having been in an odd incident where he severely cut his own hand with a pocket-knife whilst in a carriage in the Grassmarket in Edinburgh (blaming it on broken glass in the carriage though none existed). Dr William Farquharson attended him and visited him for two months as he recovered, describing him as "deranged", but seemingly gaining some degree of friendship or empathy.

In the summer of 1790 Kinloch left Gilmerton House in the middle of the night and travelled to Greenock on the west coast of Scotland to track down his friend, Major MacKay, who was much surprised to see him. In October 1790 he is again in London but invites a friend (Cpt Miller) to join him in a hotel on the Oxford Road but is not there. He is tracked down at Old Slaughter's Coffee House on St Martins Lane. He returned to Scotland after a visit to Cpt Miller's recruiting office in Huntingdon in November 1790. He was dressed in black to mourn the recent death of his eldest brother, Cpt David Kinloch (mentioned in few genealogies but the original heir-apparent to the baronetcy).

On 1 April 1794 the same doctor saw him again (on North Bridge) and thought him likely to harm himself. He saw him later that year in irons in Haddington jail, and considered him further disturbed.

He is recorded in having struck Francis in the face over an argument at his father's dining table, prior to his father's death, wounding Francis badly. Francis is said to have forgiven him.

His father, Sir David died at Gilmerton House (in the presence of all his children) on 18 February 1795 precipitating a bizarre series of events. Firstly the baronetcy passed to Sir Francis Kinloch, his eldest son, then becoming 6th baronet. Archibald is stated as having been dissatisfied by his settlement within the will (receiving only £1300 of £1500 he thought due).

On 1 April Kinloch was greeted at his Edinburgh lodgings in the Black Bull Tavern on Leith Street, by Dr James Home. They ate at Hunters on Writers Court (near St Giles Cathedral) together with his younger brother, Alexander Kinloch. Archibald is said to have "only" drunk one or two gills of brandy (around half a pint!)

On 13 April Kinloch was seen by an acquaintance travelling in a chaise to Haddington, where his brother Sir Francis Kinloch lived. He was seen again in Mrs Fairbairn's restaurant in Haddington but appeared (and declared himself) very ill. Kinloch returned to Gilmerton with the two men (including Dr George Somner) he had met in the restaurant (each in their own chaise), but a mile from Gilmerton the carriages paused for the men to urinate and Kinloch began walking back to Haddington. His carriage driver went to find him and did not return, having been then ordered to take him to Haddington, however he was instead returned to Gilmerton House. Kinloch was seen holding a pistol in his room there and declared himself very ill.

On the morning of 14 April (at 5 am) Kinloch was seen wandering in Beanston Wood near his home. He said he was planting. He later barricaded himself into his room and did not emerge until 5 pm, demanding laudanum because he wished to sleep and not wake. He was seen to be carrying two pistols. On the evening of 14 April 1795 Sir Francis Kinloch travelled from his home at Athelstaneford (near Haddington) to visit Archibald at Gilmerton House, recently inherited from their father. He dined with Archibald (as host) and a few other men, including a George Somner. The group as a whole sat until 3 am.

Archibald appears to have arisen from in his bed-chamber, half-dressed, and confronted Sir Francis on the stair. He came down with two loaded pistols in his pockets. He fired one, hitting Francis in the chest as he stood on the staircase. He was taken to his room where the men tried to tend him, and had to escort his sister, Harriet Kinlkoch, back to her room. Francis was mortally wounded, but was fully conscious and it was he who summoned a doctor, through an "expressed" (couriered) letter. Dr James Home and Dr Francis Home were called from their home at Foulis Close in Edinburgh arriving at 9:30 am but could do little to assist. Archibald was placed in a strait jacket, already in the house, and put into the care of a nurse.

Dr Benjamin Bell arrived from Edinburgh at some point during the day and extracted the bullet whilst Francis was still alive. The bullet had passed most of the way through the body and was extracted from the back, near the spine. Sir Francis had a slow and painful death, dying at 11 pm on the evening of 16 April some 44 hours after the shooting. However, he had expressed to those present a deep regret for his poor brother, and seemed to lay no blame on his shoulders. He had specifically requested that the authorities not be contacted. However, Archibald was placed in Haddington Jail on 16 April, escorted there by Hay Smith WS. He was visited in jail by Dr George Somner, Dr Home and Rev Goldie. He was moved to the Edinburgh Tolbooth on 24 April.

On 18 April three doctors confirmed and certified the death: Benjamin Bell and James Home of Edinburgh and Dr George Somner of Haddington (presumably Sir Francis' personal physician). It is unclear why this postdated the death by 36 hours). Archibald was arrested on 30 May and placed in the Tolbooth Prison on the Royal Mile in Edinburgh, adjacent to the Scottish High Courts. The two pistols, inscribed by the maker H. W. Mortimer of London, and the ball taken from Francis' body were held as evidence.

== The trial ==
The trial took place on 30 June 1795 in the Edinburgh High Court. The jury comprised 15 men from the Edinburgh area, including several "gentlemen" to best equate to peers of the baronet.

The trial was held under Lord Justice Clerk, Robert McQueen, Lord Braxfield, presiding over: David Rae, Lord Eskgrove; William Nairne, Lord Dunsinane; John Swinton, Lord Swinton; and William Craig, Lord Craig.

The prosecution was led by Robert Dundas of Arniston. Robert Blair (later Lord Avontoun) was Solicitor General, John Burnet was Advocate and Hugh Warrender was Agent.

For the defence David Hume led Kinloch's defence team, aided by three further advocates: Charles Hope (later Lord Granton); William Rae; and David Monypenny (later Solicitor General for Scotland. Kinloch pleaded not guilty after the reading of the charge of murder. His brother-in-law Sir Foster Cunliffe, and cousin, James Wilkie of Foulden, stood with him through the trial.

Witnesses (family, friends and servants) attested to Archibald's insanity but, in general, the medical witnesses did not consider him insane. Much blame was placed on the servants for not being there to assist in the disarming of Archibald.

Curiously, contrary to standard client-lawyer privileges, Charles Hay WS, Sir Francis Kinloch's lawyer, was asked to disclose private conversations both as a friend and in his professional capacity. He had last seen him on 12 or 13 March. He intimated that Sir Francis had gone through his father's papers (after he died) with lawyers, to separate the important from the unimportant, but on burning the latter, was accused by Archibald of prejudicing the younger members of the family (including himself). This had led to a growing resentment. Mr Hay had written a legal opinion to the effect that the settlement made to the younger siblings exceeded the legal requirements and did not require further legal investigation. This had not satisfied Archibald who felt cheated, and considered that he was still owed £200. This appears to be the underlying cause of the attack. He further suspected Francis of trying to poison him with pills on the day before the attack.

A large amount of the evidence circled around financial matters between Sir Gordon and other parties and of little if any relevance to the murder. Two of the main witnesses, his brother Alexander and sister Harriet, were excused the need to give evidence, it considered to be "too distressing". The Lord Justice in his summary asked the jury to consider whether the acts might be the result of madness as a malady or temporary madness caused by drunkenness. He clarified that the law saw drunken madness as a "voluntary contracted madness" requiring judgement as though the person be in their right senses. It was not disputed that a murder had occurred, the issue was to consider If Archibald was insane at the time.

The jury, led by Andrew Wauchope, found Kinloch guilty, but considered him to have been temporarily insane.

The judgement was read by the Lord Justice Clerk on 15 July 1795. The accused (referred to in the trial as the "pannel") was unanimously declared guilty. However, they declared him insane and "not an object of punishment". This saved him from the death penalty. He was sentenced to life imprisonment in the Tolbooth. An odd rider on the sentence allowed any person to secure his release on payment of £10,000 and on upon promise of holding him securely in another place (effectively allowing a house arrest). Dr William Farquharson approached Lord Braxfield on 17 July and successfully secured Kinloch's release into his own care. It is not clear if the required bond was paid. If so it equates to around £5million by current (2016) standards.

== Death ==
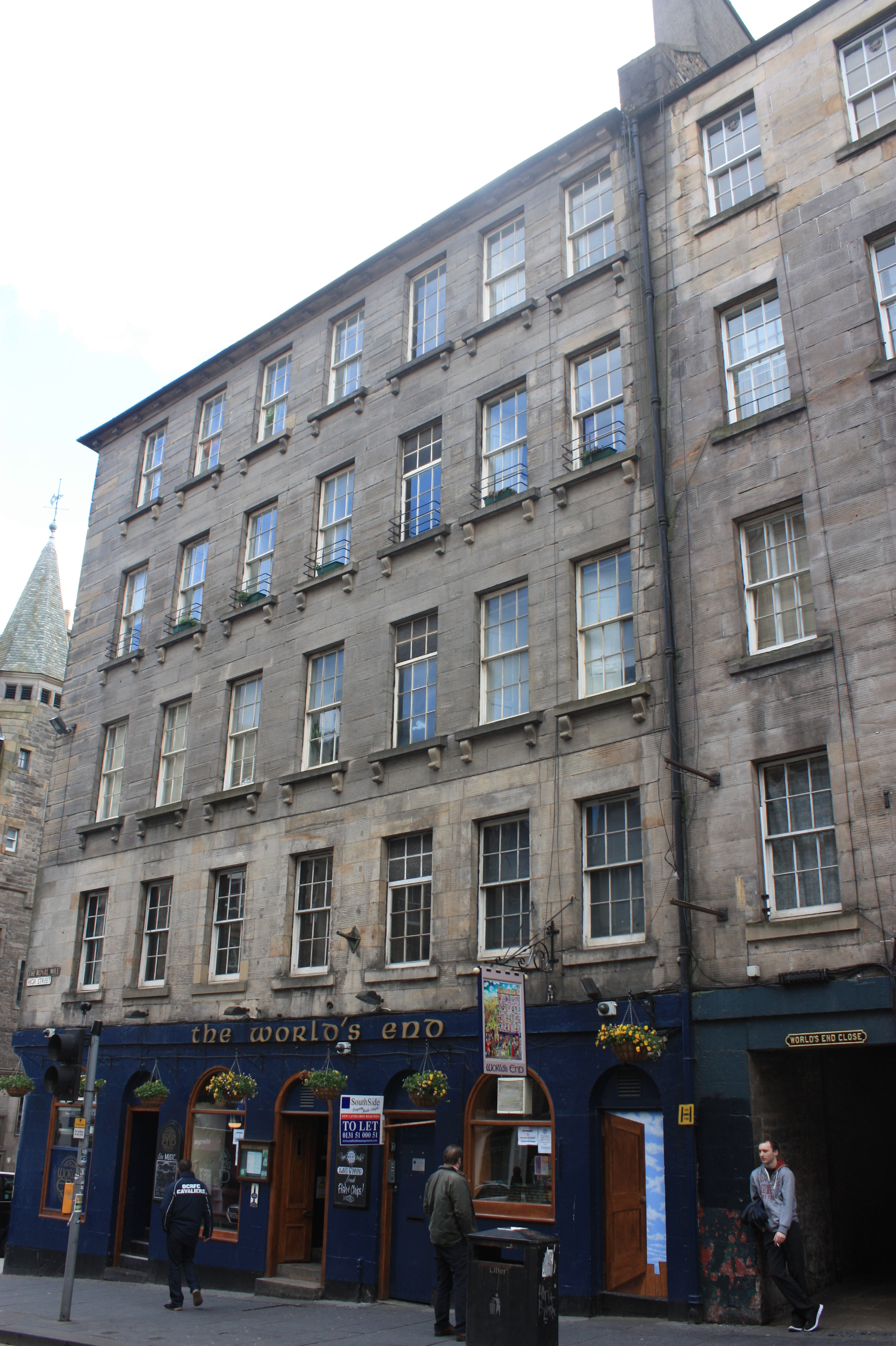
Worlds End Close, Edinburgh

Kinloch went to live with Farquharson at his house at Worlds End Close on the Royal Mile. Farquharson disappears from the Edinburgh Post Office Directory soon thereafter, presumably choosing a less urban environment for this onerous task of caring for Kinloch.

Archibald died in 1800, presumably in Farquharson's house (given the requirements of the judgement). At this point, his younger brother, Sir Alexander Kinloch (Sandie) became the 8th baronet and the Kinloch baronetcy returned to normality.

Baronetage of Nova Scotia
Preceded by Francis Kinloch	Baronet (of Gilmerton); 1795–1800	Succeeded by Alexander Kinloch
