= Johannes Dierauer =

Swiss historian and librarian

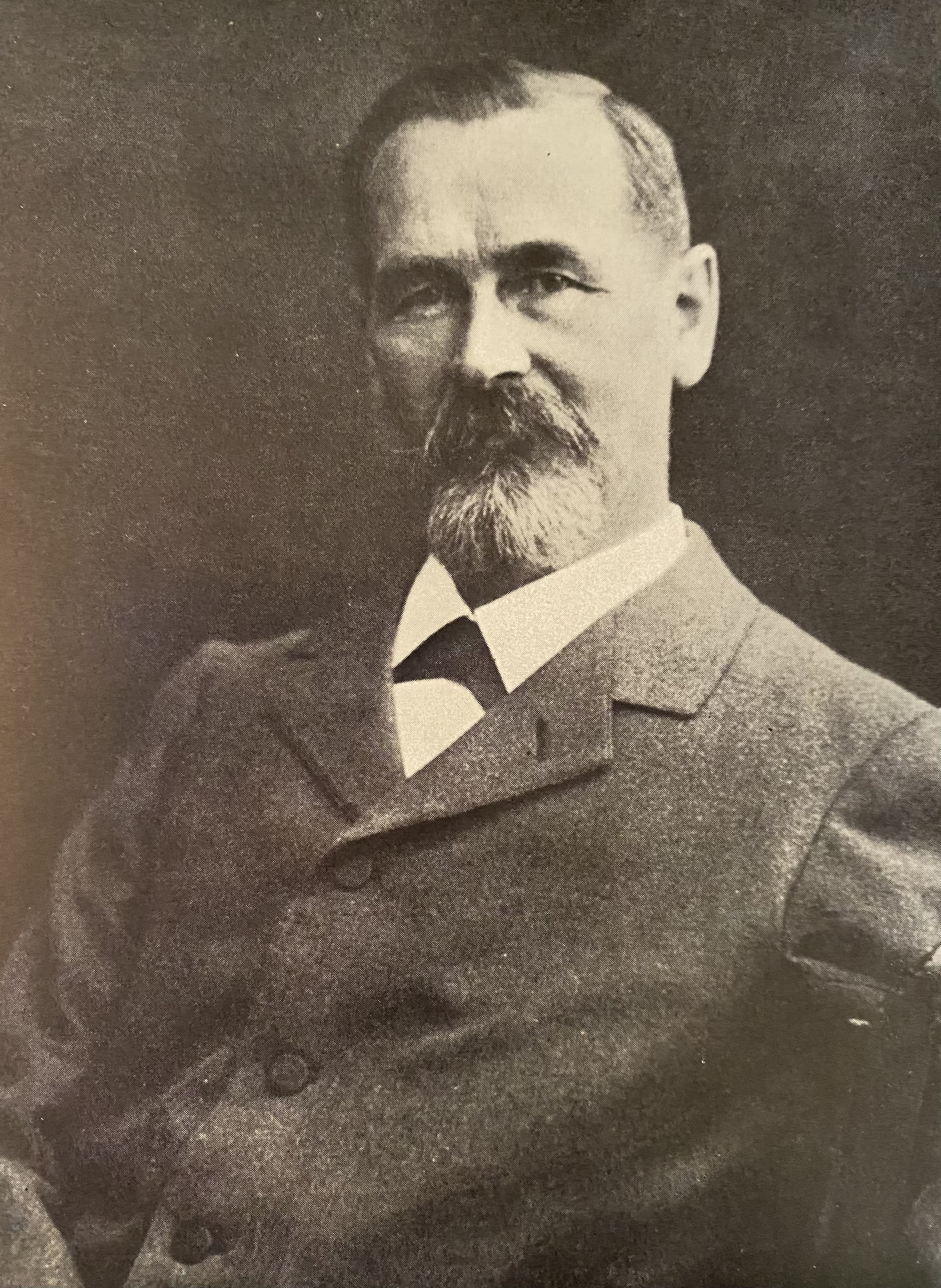
- Born: 20 March 1842; Berneck, St. Gallen, Switzerland
- Died: 14 March 1920 (aged 77); St. Gallen, St. Gallen, Switzerland
- Education: University of Zürich; University of Bonn; University of Paris
- Occupations: historian, librarian
- Spouse: Lisette Brunner
- Children: 2
- Parent(s): Jakob Dierauer; Engelina Hohl
- Writing career
- Genre: history

Johannes Dierauer (20 March 1842 – 14 March 1920) was a Swiss historian and librarian. He taught history classes at the Cantonal School in St. Gallen from 1868 to 1907 and, from 1874 to 1920, served as the head of the City Library of St. Gallen.

== Biography ==
Dierauer was born in Berneck, St. Gallen on 20 March 1842 to Jakob Dierauer and Engelina Hohl. His father was a farmer whose family belonged to Berneck's historic bourgeoisie.

He studied history at the universities of Zürich, Bonn and Paris, receiving his doctorate at Zürich in 1868 with a dissertation on Trajan, titled Beiträge zu einer kritischen Geschichte Trajans. From 1868 to 1907 he taught classes in history at the cantonal school in St. Gallen, and from 1874 onward, was head of the Stadtbibliothek Vadiana, the city library in St. Gallen.

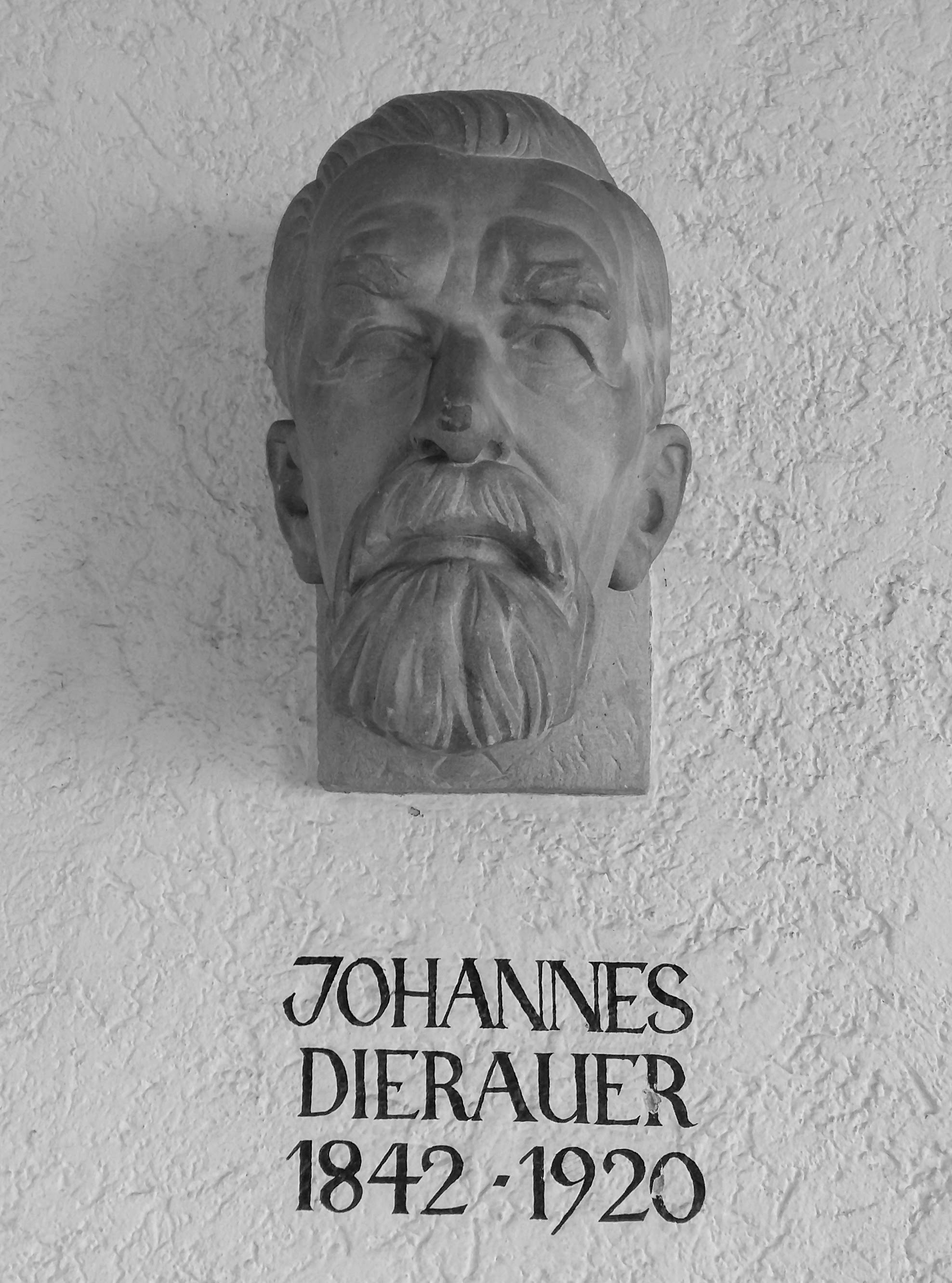
Plaque of Dierauer in the Marktgewölbe of the Berneck town hall

He was married to Lisette Brunner of Oberhelfenschwil, with whom he had two daughters.

Dierauer died in St. Gallen on 14 March 1920.

== Published works ==
His magnum opus was a history of the Swiss Confederation, Geschichte der schweizerischen Eidgenossenschaft, published in five volumes from 1887 to 1917. Other noted writings by Dierauer are:

- Müller-Friedberg; Lebensbild eines schweizerischen Staatsmannes (1755–1836) (as editor, 1885) – Karl von Müller-Friedberg; Life of a Swiss statesman (1755–1836).
- Ernst Götzinger : ein Lebensbild (1897) – Biography of Ernst Götzinger.
- Die Befreiung des Rheintals 1798 (1898) – The liberation of the Rhine Valley in 1798.
- Chronik der Stadt Zürich (as editor, 1900) – Chronicle of the city of Zürich.
- Der Kanton St. Gallen in der Regenerationszeit (1831–1840) (1902) – The canton of St. Gallen in the regeneration period (1831–1840).
- Politische Geschichte des Kantons St. Gallen, 1803–1903 (1904) – Political history of the canton of St. Gallen, 1803–1903.
- Der Zug der Schweden gegen Konstanz 1633. Eine Verletzung der schweizerischen Neutralität im Dreißigjährigen Kriege (1906) – Swedish troops at Konstanz, 1633; a violation of Swiss neutrality in the Thirty Years' War.

He was the author of 18 biographies in the Allgemeine Deutsche Biographie.
