= Gottlieb Emanuel von Haller =

Swiss historian, numismatist, botanist, politician, diplomat and librarian

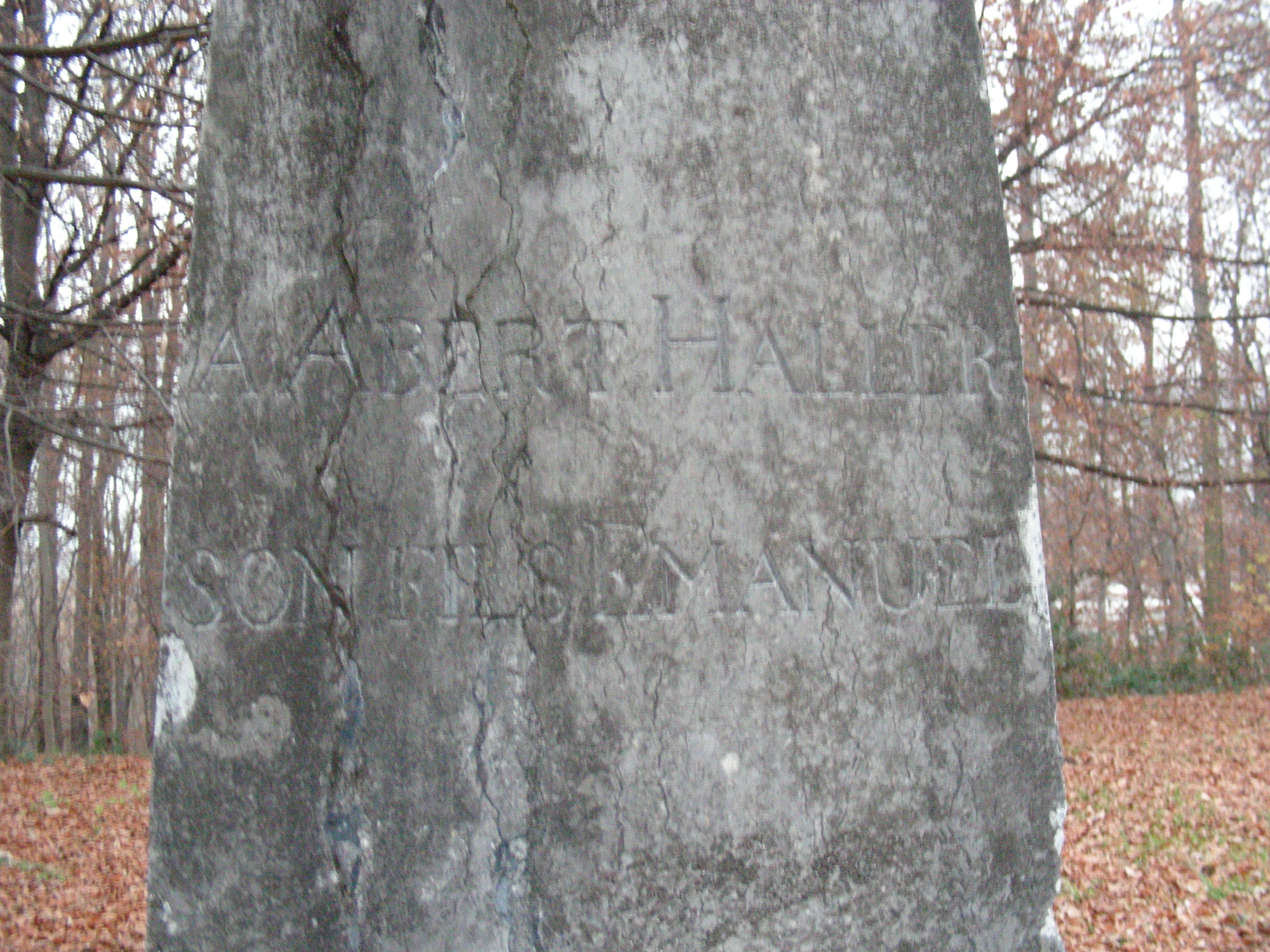
Emanuel Haller Memorial

Gottlieb Emanuel von Haller (1735–1786) was a Swiss historian, numismatist, botanist, politician, diplomat and librarian.

== Biography ==
He was the eldest son of polymath Albrecht von Haller. Born in Bern, he studied law and history in Göttingen, where his father was professor for medicine and botany.

He returned to Bern in 1753. He entered public service in Bern, in 1763 as vice-librarian, 1765 as secretary of the war council, and from 1775 as member of the city council. He was a fellow of the Academy of Sciences Leopoldina from 1778. He was sent to represent Bern in the transmontane bailiwicks in 1779/80 and from 1785 until his death he served as reeve of Nyon.

He married Anna Margarethe Schultheß (1734–1810) in 1761, with whom he had six sons and four daughters. One of his sons was political philosopher Karl Ludwig von Haller.

== Works ==
As a student, he wrote pamphlets against the Linnean system of taxonomy. During his career he authored numerous works on bibliothecography, numismatics and the history of Switzerland, writing in German, French and Latin. His magnum opus was a History of Switzerland (Bibliothek der Schweizer-Geschichte) in six volumes, two volumes published during his lifetime, the remaining four, which were ready for print at the time of his death, were published posthumously by J.J. Stapfer.

- Epistola ad patrem, dubia ex Linnaei fundamentis botanicis hausta continens, Göttingen, 1750
- Dubiorum contra sect. VII. Fundam. bot. Linnaei, Göttingen, 1753
- Specimen bibliothecae Helveticae, Bern, 1757
- Conseils pour former une Bibliothèque historique de la Suisse, Bern, 1771
- Wilhelm Tell – Eine Vorlesung, Bern, 1772
- Schweitzerisches Münz- und Medaillenkabinett, Bern, 1781/82
- Bibliothek der Schweizer-Geschichte und aller Theile, so dahin Bezug haben, Bern, 1785–1787 (doi:10.3931/e-rara-24952)

The standard author abbreviation G.Haller is used to indicate this person as the author when citing a botanical name.

== See also ==
- Historiography of Switzerland
