= Fiona Davis =

Contemporary novelist

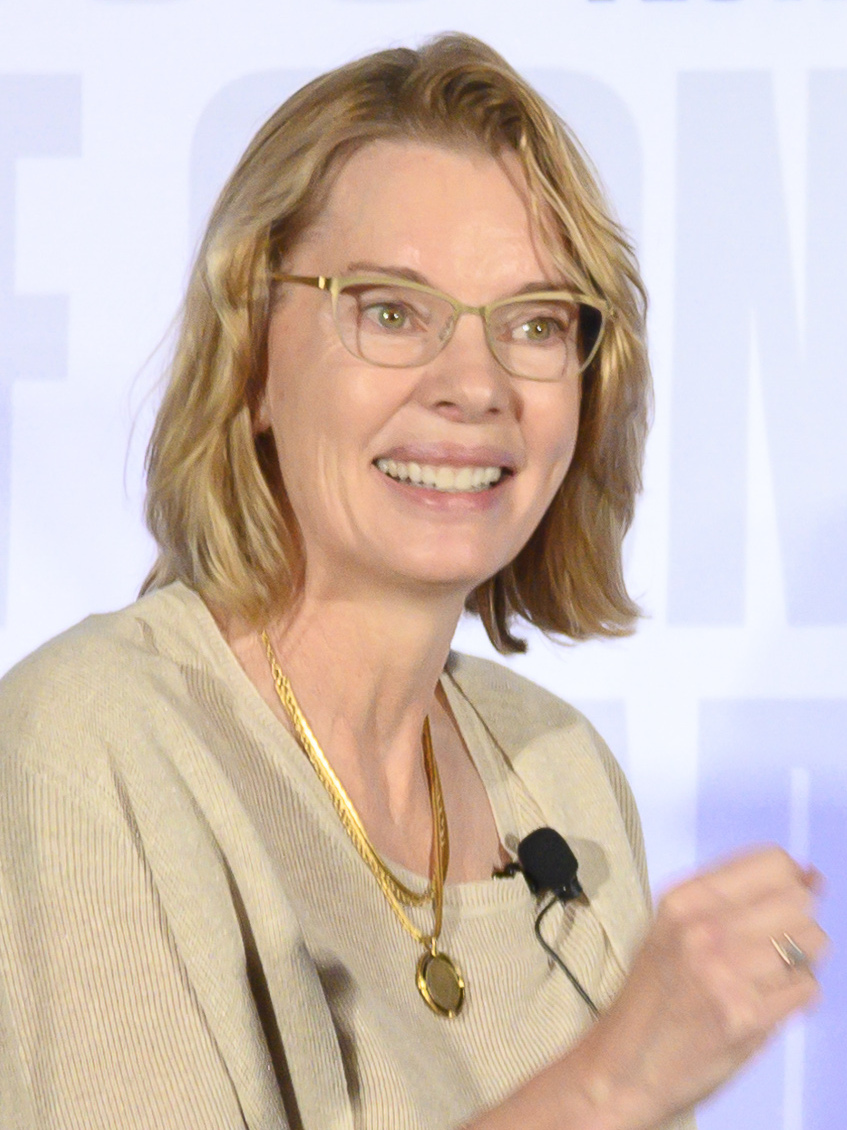
- Davis in 2025
- Born: 1966 (age 59–60); Canada
- Writing career
- Genre: historical fiction
- Notable works: The Dollhouse; The Address; The Masterpiece; The Chelsea Girls; The Lions of Fifth Avenue; The Magnolia Palace

Fiona Davis (born 1966) is a New York Times best selling author, who writes historical fiction novels that are inspired by New York City architecture. Davis' novels are often set in iconic buildings in New York City.

== Early life and education ==
Davis was born in Canada in 1966, and during her childhood, she was raised in New Jersey, Utah, and Texas. She is a graduate of both the College of William & Mary and the Graduate School of Journalism at Columbia University.

== Career ==
Prior to beginning her career as a novelist, Davis moved to New York City to pursue a career as an actress. Later, she enrolled as a student in the School of Journalism at Columbia University, and after graduating, worked as a journalist before beginning her career as a novelist of historical fiction.

== Novels ==
Davis' novels include the following:

- The Stolen Queen, Penguin Random House, January 7, 2025
- The Spectacular, Penguin Random House, June 13, 2023
- The Magnolia Palace, Penguin Random House, January 24, 2022
- The Lions of Fifth Avenue, Penguin Random House, August 3, 2020
- The Chelsea Girls, Penguin Random House, July 29, 2019
- The Masterpiece, Penguin Random House, August 6, 2018
- The Address, Penguin Random House, July 31, 2017
- The Dollhouse, Penguin Random House, August 23, 2016
