= Kinloch baronets of Kinloch (1st creation, 1685) =

scutcheon of the Kinloch baronets of Kinloch, 1st creation

The Kinloch baronetcy, of Kinloch in the County of Fife, was created in the Baronetage of Nova Scotia on 5 September 1685 for David Kinloch, grandson of David Kinloch the physician, by James II and VII in the first year of his reign.

The 2nd Baronet, James Kinloch (died 1744), married Elizabeth Nevay. The 3rd Baronet, Sir James Kinloch (-Nevay), who married Janet Duff, took part in the Jacobite Rising of 1745. He was captured, tried, and condemned to death and the baronetcy and lands were forfeited. Later, he was pardoned. He inherited from his mother, and took Nevay as additional surname.

== Kinloch baronets, of Kinloch (1685) ==
- Sir David Kinloch, 1st Baronet (died c. 1700)
- Sir James Kinloch, 2nd Baronet (c. 1680–1744)
- Sir James Kinloch, 3rd Baronet (died 1766)

== Extended family ==
The baronetcy was not restored, but the Kinloch lands were bought by friends and passed back to the family. The 3rd Baronet's son, William Kinloch (born c. 1735), sold the Kinloch estate to his cousin George Oliphant Kinloch, grandson of James Kinloch, younger brother of the 1st Baronet.

George Oliphant Kinloch's son George Kinloch, a politician, fled to France in 1819, after advocating reform and suffering outlawry under Scottish law. He later returned to Britain and became the first representative for Dundee in the House of Commons in 1832. His son was the 1st Baronet of the 1873 creation.
