= Sir Francis Kinloch, 1st Baronet =

Scottish politician

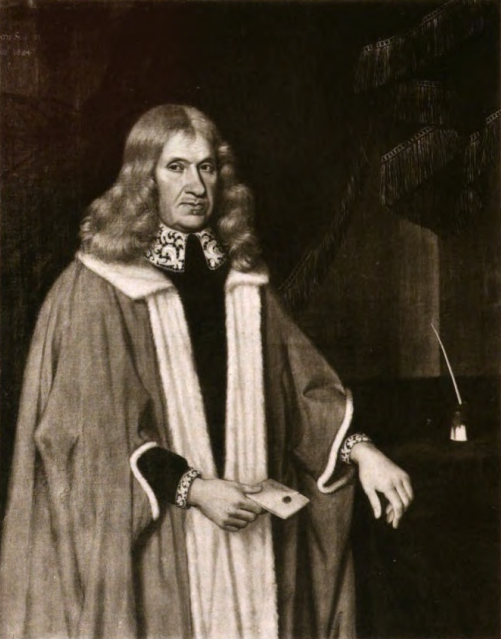
Sir Francis Kinloch, Lord Provost of Edinburgh

Sir Francis Kinloch, 1st Baronet, of Gilmerton, was a seventeenth-century Scottish politician who served as Lord Provost of Edinburgh in 1677.

== Biography ==
Francis Kinloch was the son of Andrew Kinloch, a merchant of Rochelle. He purchased the Haddingtonshire estates of Gilmerton, Athelstaneford and Markle, having a charter of Markle on 24 July 1664. He served as a commissioner of supply, and was Lord Provost of Edinburgh in 1677. He also represented Edinburgh within the Scottish Parliament in the vote on the Convention of the Estates in 1678, and on 16 September 1686 was created a Baronet of Nova Scotia, with remainder to the heirs male of his body.

In 1677 he sold land on Melrose Close on the south side of the Royal Mile in Edinburgh to Sir George Mackenzie of Rosehaugh.

Kinloch was married to Magdalen Macmath of Newbyres. She died aged fifty-nine on 16 November 1674 and was buried in the Greyfriars Kirkyard. He was buried there on 17 December 1691. Their eldest son Francis succeeded to the baronetcy. Their large family included Alexander Kinloch who married Mary Leslie, daughter of Sir David Leslie, 1st Lord Newark.

Baronetage of Nova Scotia
New creation	Baronet (of Gilmerton); 1686–1691	Succeeded by Francis Kinloch
