= Francis Kinloch (congressman) =

American politician

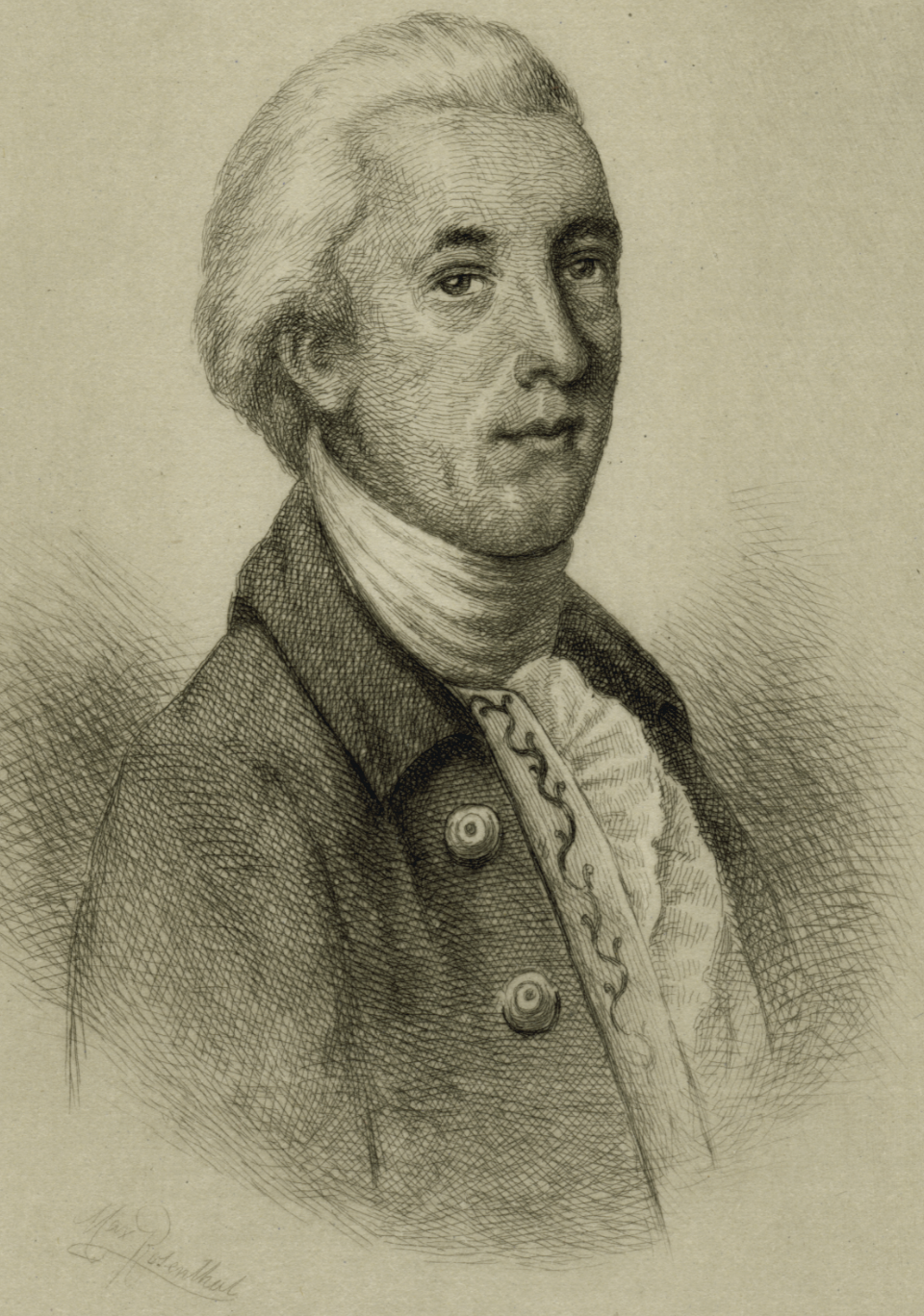
- Etching of Francis Kinloch by Max Rosenthal

Member of the Second Continental Congress
- In office 1780

Personal details
- Born: March 7, 1755
- Died: February 8, 1826 (aged 70)

Francis Kinloch (March 7, 1755 – February 8, 1826) was an American lawyer and rice planter from Georgetown, South Carolina. He served as a delegate for South Carolina to the Continental Congress in 1780.

== Biography ==
Coat of Arms of Francis Kinloch

His father, Francis, was a member of the royal council for South Carolina from 1717 until 1757, and at one time its president, and his grandfather, James, came from Scotland about 1700.

Francis, the son, was first educated in Charleston, but was sent to London in 1768, after his father's death, and placed at Eton. In 1774, after travelling through France, Italy, and Switzerland, he remained in the Republic of Geneva with his friend Johannes von Müller, a Swiss historian. Though at first he had sympathized with the Tories, at the beginning of the American Revolutionary War he returned to Charleston, and received a captain's commission in the South Carolina militia. He was on Gen. Isaac Huger's staff at the attack on Savannah in 1779, and received a bullet wound. He then served on Gen. William Moultrie's staff until 1780, when he was sent to the Continental congress in Philadelphia for one year. While trying to escape from his house during "Simcoe's raid," he was captured, but released on parole and returned home.

After the war he was engaged, with his brother Cleland, in settling their desolated estates near Georgetown. For many years he served in the South Carolina House of Representatives, and was a justice of the peace and of the quorum. He was a delegate to the convention of 1787, and voted there in favor of ratifying the constitution of the United States. He was a member of the legislative council in 1789, and in 1790 one of the convention that formed the constitution for South Carolina. In 1803 he went with his family to the south of France and Geneva, but about 1806 he returned to Charleston.

He was the author of Letters from Geneva (2 vols., Boston), and a Eulogy on George Washington, Esq. (Georgetown, 1800; reprinted privately, New York, 1847).

His surviving letters include correspondence with contemporaries such as James Madison and John Laurens.
