= Ernst Götzinger =

Swiss Germanist and historian (1837–1896)

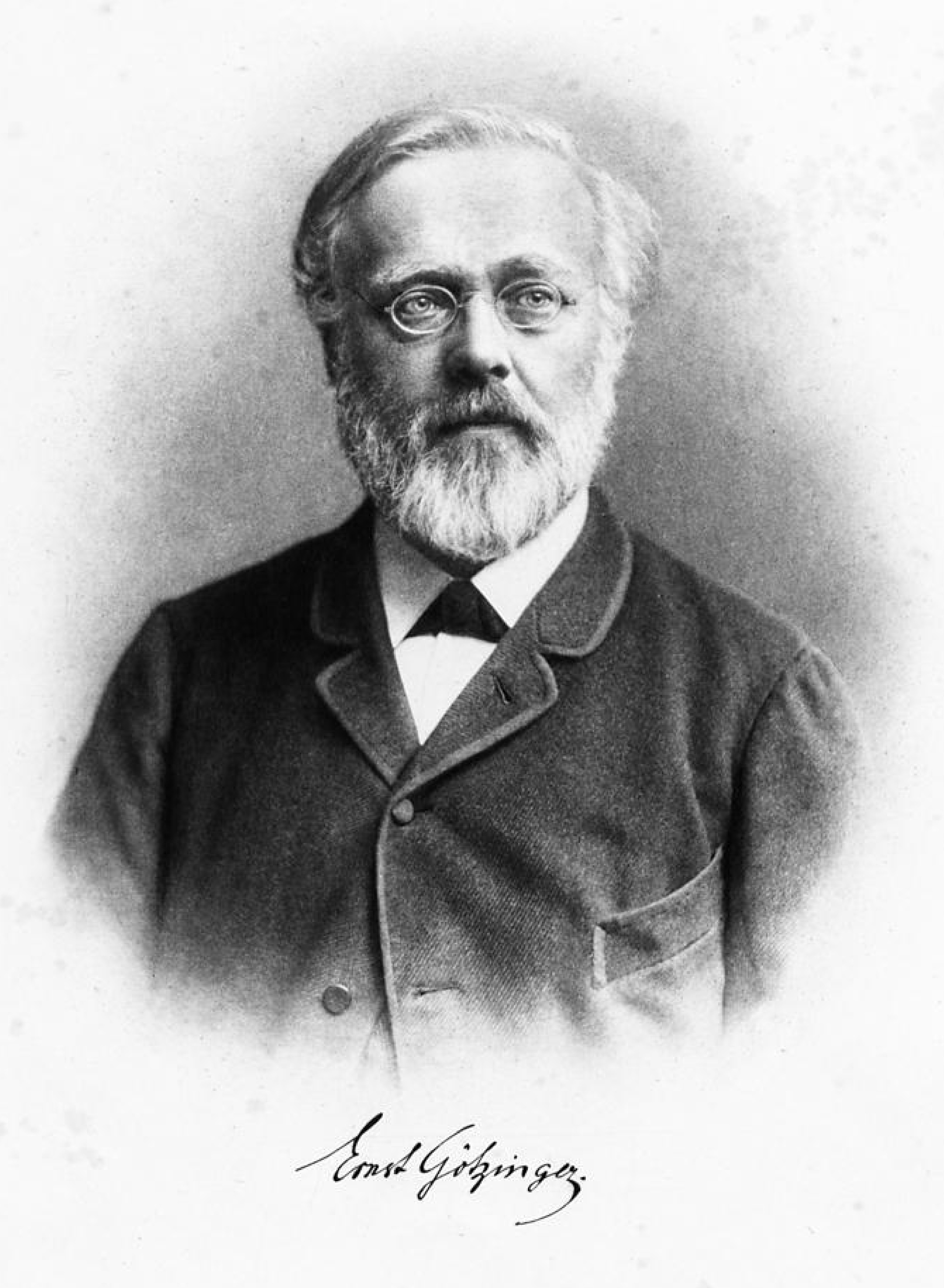
Ernst Götzinger

Ernst Götzinger (23 September 1837 – 10 August 1896) was a Swiss Germanist and historian. He was the son of philologist Maximilian Wilhelm Götzinger (1799–1856).

Born in Schaffhausen, he studied philology at the University of Basel as a pupil of Wilhelm Wackernagel, then furthered his education at the universities of Bonn and Göttingen, where his influences included Wilhelm Müller and Leo Meyer. In 1860 he received his doctorate from Göttingen with a dissertation on the Anglo-Saxon poet Cædmon, titled Ueber die Dichtungen des Angelsachsen Caedmon und deren Verfasser. From 1860 up until his death in St. Gallen, he taught classes in German language and literature at the cantonal school in St. Gallen. He was a member of the Historischer Verein des Kantons St.Gallen.

== Selected works ==
- Zwei St. Gallische Minnesaenger: 1. Ulrich von Singenberg, der Truchsess. 2. Konrad von Landegg, der Schenk, 1866 – Two St. Gallen minnesingers; Ulrich von Singenberg and Konrad von Landeck.
- Johannes Kesslers Sabbata: Chronik der Jahre 1523-1539 (2 volumes, 1866–68) – Johannes Kessler's Sabbata, chronicle of the years 1523–1539.
- Warhafftige Nuwe Zittung des jungst vergangnen Tutschen Kriegs, 1871.
- Joachim von Watt als Geschichtschreiber, 1873 – Joachim von Watt as a historian.
- Hebels Alemannische Gedichte (as editor, 1873) – Johann Peter Hebel's Alemannic poetry.
- Deutsche historische Schriften: Auf Veranstaltung des Historischen Vereins des Kantons St. Gallen (as editor; 3 volumes, 1875–79) – German historical writings; from the Historical Association of the Canton St. Gallen.
- Reallexicon der deutschen Altertümer, 1881 – Reallexicon of German antiquities.
- Fridolin Sichers Chronik (as editor, 1885) – Fridolin Sicher's chronicle.
- Joachim Vadian Reformator und Geschichtschreiber von St. Gallen, 1893 – Joachim Vadian, reformer and historian of St. Gallen.

He was the author of several biographies in the Allgemeine Deutsche Biographie.
