= Robert Glutz-Blotzheim =

Swiss librarian, politician, historian and writer

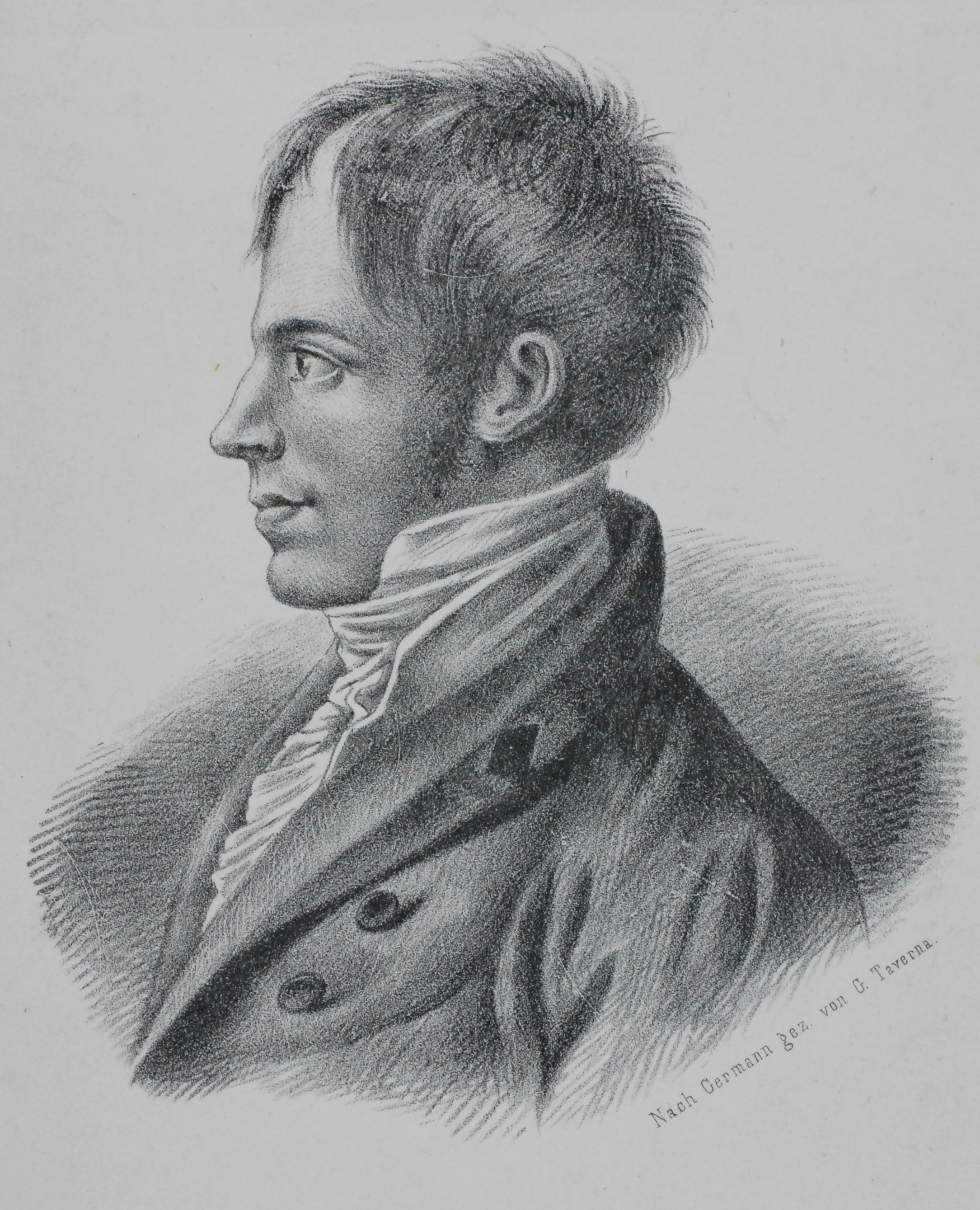
Robert Glutz-Blotzheim

Robert Glutz-Blotzheim, name also given as Robert Glutz von Blotzheim (30 January 1786, in Solothurn – 14 April 1818, in Munich) was a Swiss librarian and historian.

He studied history and political science at the universities of Landshut and Würzburg. From 1807 and 1814 he was manager of the public library in Solothurn, during which time, he became editor of the periodical Solothurn Wochenblatt (from 1810). In 1816 he relocated to Zurich in order to conduct historical research. In 1818 he was offered a position at the Academy of Sciences in Munich, but died of a stroke a few days after his arrival (age 32).

After the death of Johannes von Müller, he published a continuation of his Geschichten Schweizerischer Eidgenossenschaft ("History of the Swiss Confederation"; volume 5.2, covering the years 1489–1517). In this work he wrote a highly acclaimed account of the Battle of Dornach (1499). In 1813 he published Topographisch-statistische Beschreibung des Kantons Solothurn ("Topographical and statistical description of the Canton of Solothurn").
