= Johannes von Müller =

Swiss historian (1752–1809)

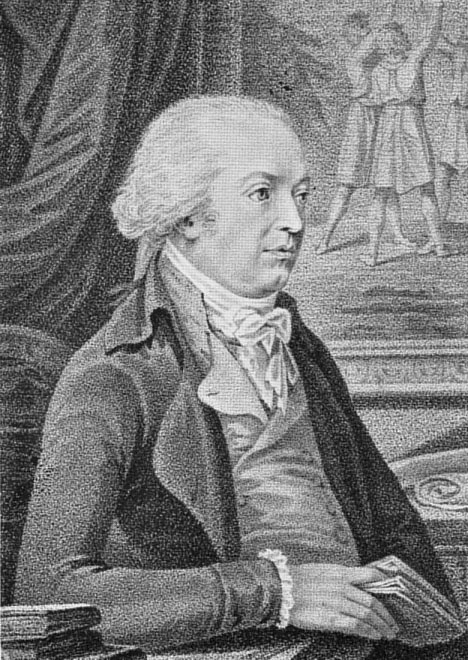
Johannes von Müller

Johannes von Müller (3 January 1752 – 29 May 1809) was a Swiss historian.

== Biography ==
He was born in Schaffhausen, where his father was a clergyman and rector of the gymnasium. In his youth, his maternal grandfather, Johannes Schoop (1696–1757), roused in him an interest in the history of his country. At the age of eight he is said to have written history of Schaffhausen, and at eleven he knew the names and dates of all the kings of the four great monarchies. His ardour for historical studies was further stimulated by Schlözer, when Müller went (1769–1771) to the University of Göttingen, nominally to study theology. In July 1771 he undertook a sketch of Swiss history for a publisher of Halle, but his theological studies and the preparation of a Latin dissertation on the Bellum cimbricum (publ. in 1772) prevented much progress.

In April 1772 he passed his theological examination, and soon after became a professor of Greek at the Collegium Humanitatis in Schaffhausen. He then began to devote his leisure hours to the investigation of Swiss chronicles and documents. Early in 1774, on the advice of his friend Charles Victor de Bonstetten, he gave up this post and became tutor in the Tronchin family at Geneva. However, in 1775 he also resigned this position, and passed his time with various friends, such as Francis Kinloch from South Carolina, in Geneva and Vaud; all that while engaged in carrying his historical scheme into effect. Having accumulated much material, he began the actual composition of his work in the spring of 1776, and the printing in the summer of 1777. But difficulties arose with the censor, and matters came to a standstill.

In 1778–1779 Müller delivered a set of lectures on universal history (revised between 1782 and 1784), which were published as Vierundzwanzig Bücher allgemeiner Geschichte in 1811, and often republished. In 1780 the first volume (extending to 1388) of his Geschichten der Schweizer appeared, nominally at Boston (to avoid the censor), though really at Bern; and it was well received. In 1781 he published at Berlin, in French, his Essais historiques. During his visit to Berlin, he had an interview with Frederick the Great from whom he had hoped to obtain an office, but he did not receive it. He was on his way back to Switzerland when the landgrave of Hesse-Kassel (or Hesse-Cassel) named him professor of history at the Collegium Carolinum. He stayed at Kassel until 1783, publishing in 1782 his Reisen der Päpste, a book wherein certain leanings towards Romanism are visible, as well as his distrust of emperor Joseph II's hegemonic politics.

On his return to Geneva (1783), he accepted the post of reader to the brother of his old patron, Tronchin, and occupied himself with remodeling his published work of 1780. In order to improve his financial position, he accepted early in 1786 the post of librarian to Friedrich Karl Joseph von Erthal, the prince-elector and of archbishop of Mainz, who bestowed many important offices upon him and obtained his elevation to nobility from the emperor Leopold II. in 1791. In June 1786 he issued volume I (reaching to 1412) and two years later volume II (to 1436) of the definitive form of his Swiss history, which was received with great praise. In 1787 he issued an important political tract, Zur Darstellung des Fürstenbundes, and also Briefe zweier Domherren. Then, in October 1792, Mainz was taken by the French, so Müller had to seek for another post. In February 1793 he entered the service of Emperor Francis II as an imperial Aulic Councilor.

At Vienna he spent many years, becoming chief librarian of the imperial library in 1800, and in 1795 he issued volume III (to 1443) of his Swiss history. In 1804 he became historiographer, war councillor, and member of the Academy at Berlin. In 1805, volume IV (to 1475) of his Swiss history appeared. He edited the works of Herder, and wrote various treatises for the Academy, including Über die Geschichte Friedrich's II (On the history of Frederick II).

In 1802/03 a protégé, Fritz von Hartenberg, cheated Müller out of his entire fortune in a homosexual scandal. The young man faked love letters from a Hungarian Count Batthyány and declared his love for Müller. The scandal and political intrigue, during which Müller narrowly avoided a morality suit, became known as the Hartenberg Affair. Müller's love letters to the supposed Batthyány are an important window on same-sex desire in Goethe's time.

In 1806 he became strongly inclined towards Napoleon, by whom he was received in audience after the Battle of Jena (November 1806), and from whom he accepted (end of 1807) the office of secretary of state for the Kingdom of Westphalia, exchanging this position early in 1808 for the posts of privy councillor and general director of public instruction. At the end of 1808 he published volume V (to 1489) of his great work. He died at Kassel on 29 May 1809.

== Works ==
Müller's works were published under the care of his brother Johann Georg Müller (1759–1819), pupil of Johann Gottfried Herder at Tübingen, in 27 volumes (1810–1819), and re-issued, in 40 volumes, at Stuttgart (1831–1835). Vols. 1-3 contain a revised, but unfinished, German version of Müller's Universal History. The Swiss History was re-issued at Leipzig and Zurich, in 15 volumes (1824–1853), with continuations by Robert Glutz-Blotzheim (to 1517), J. J. Hottinger (to 1531), Louis Vulliemin (to 1712), and Charles Monnard (to 1815). A French translation of the German edition (as above) appeared, in 18 volumes, at Paris and Geneva (1837–1851).

Important minor works are Essais historiques, published in French under the auspices of Frederick the Great (Berlin, 1780); Reisen der Päpste (new ed., Aix-la-Chapelle, 1831; French translation, 1859), written against the anti-papal reforms of Joseph II (although he was a Protestant); and Vierundzwanzig Bücher allgemeiner Geschichten, lectures delivered in Switzerland (3 volumes, Tübingen, 1811; often republished).

Müller's letters to Füsslin (1771–1807) were issued at Zürich (1812), and those to Charles Bonnet, etc., at Stuttgart (1835). Many letters addressed to him by various friends were published by Maurer-Constant, in 6 volumes (Schaffhausen, 1839–1840); and those written to him by his brother (1770–1809), Johann Georg Müller, appeared, under the editorship of Eduard Haug and André Weibel, at Frauenfeld (2 volumes, 1893) and Göttingen (6 volumes 2009-2011).

== Sources ==
- Gilman, D. C.; Peck, H. T.; Colby, F. M., eds. (1905). "Müller, Johannes von" . New International Encyclopedia (1st ed.). New York: Dodd, Mead.
- Ripley, George; Dana, Charles A., eds. (1879). "Müller, Johannes von" . The American Cyclopædia.
- Baynes, T. S.; Smith, W. R., eds. (1884). "Müller, Johann von" . Encyclopædia Britannica. Vol. 17 (9th ed.). New York: Charles Scribner's Sons.

Attribution:

- This work in turn cites the biographies by Heeren (1809), Döring (1835) and Monnard (1839); and biographies in G. v. Wyss's Geschichte der Historiographie in der Schweiz (Zürich, 1895), pp. 305–311, and in the Festschrift der Stadt Schaffhausen (Schaffhausen, 1891), pt. v. pp. 83–99. It also notes that F. Schwarz's pamphlet, J. von Müller und seine Schweizergeschichte (Bâle, 1884), traces the genesis of the Swiss History.
- Biographies by Karl Henking (1909–28) (to 1804), Karl Schib (1967) and Matthias Pape (1989) (1793–1807)
- Gordon A. Craig, “Johannes von Müller: The Historian in Search of a Hero,” in: The American Historical Review 74 (1969), pp. 1487–1502.
