= George Kinloch (politician) =

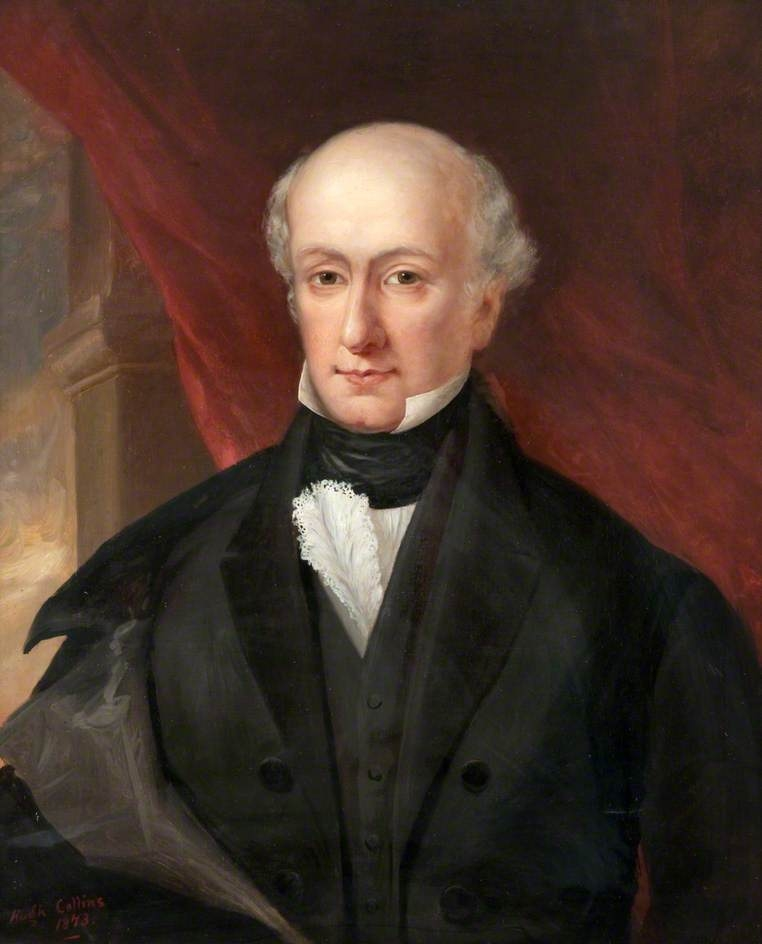
- Portrait by Hugh Collins

Member of Parliament for Dundee
- In office 1832–1833
- Succeeded by: Sir Henry Parnell, B

Personal details
- Born: 30 April 1775 Dundee, Great Britain
- Died: 28 March 1833 (aged 57) London, United Kingdom
- Resting place: Kinloch Chapel, Meigle
- Party: Radical
- Profession: Politician

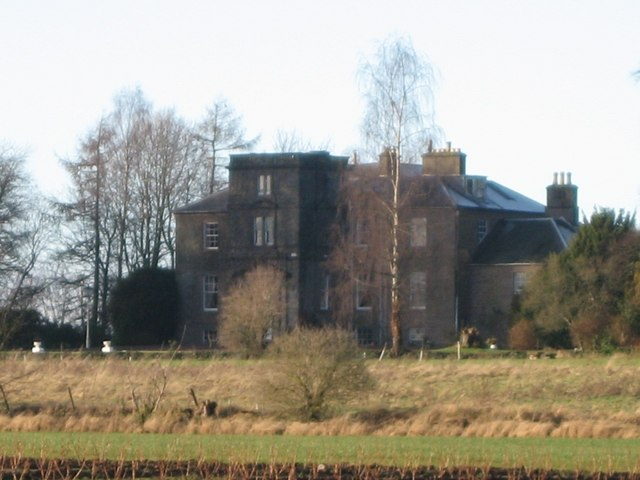
Kinloch House near Meigle, built to a design by George Kinloch in 1798

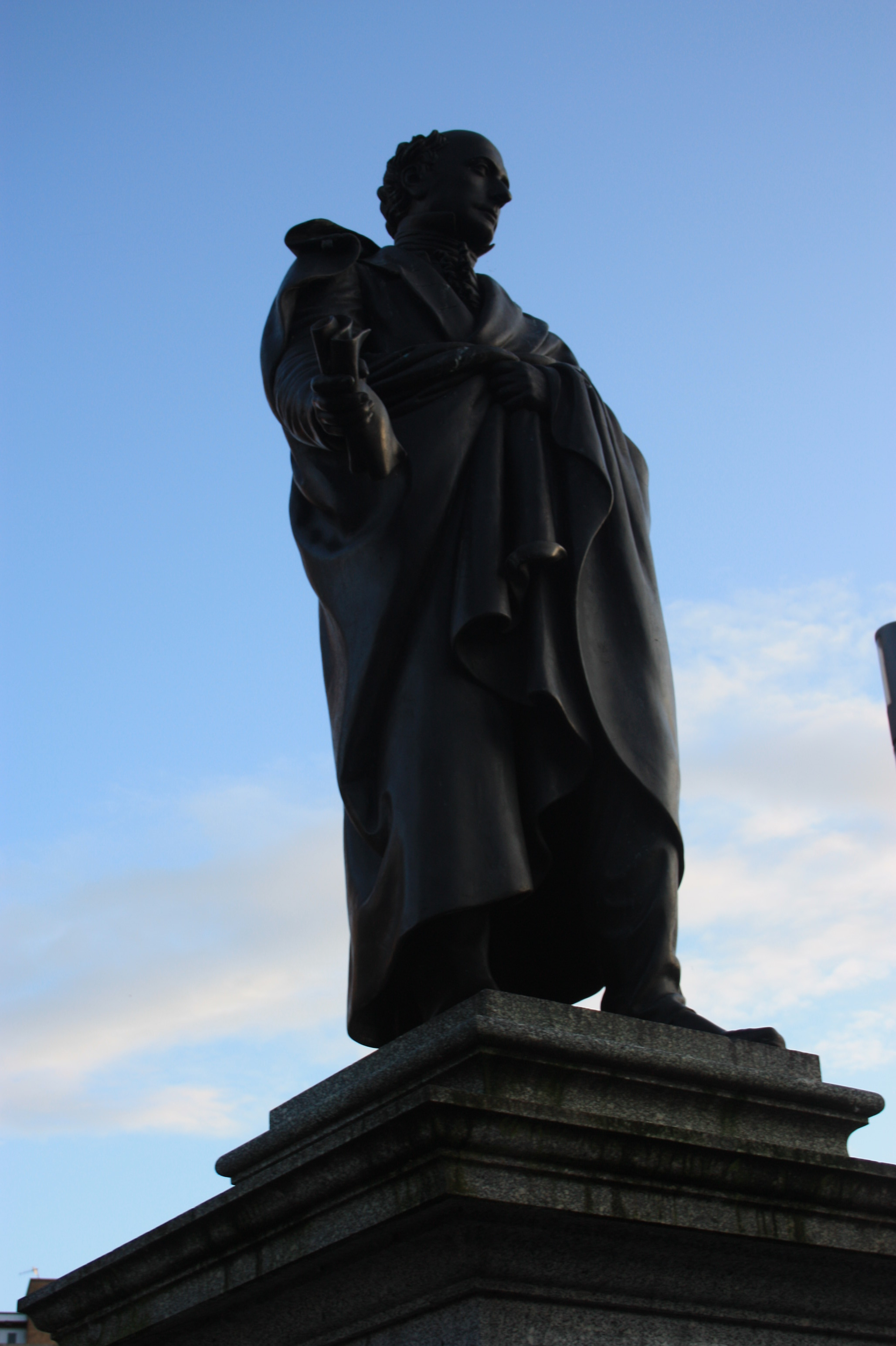
George Kinloch MP by Sir John Steell, Albert Square, Dundee

George Kinloch of Kinloch MP (30 April 1775 – 28 March 1833) was a Scottish reformer and politician.

== Life ==
Kinloch was born at Airlie Lodge in Dundee, the son of Captain George Oliphant Kinloch.

He spent time in France, 1788–1791, during the French Revolution and this influenced his political views. His grandfather had obtained by marriage the estate of Clashbenie (not far from modern Errol), which his father George Oliphant Kinloch sold in order to purchase the ancient Kinloch estate from his cousin. In 1795 aged 20 Kinloch inherited a slave plantation named "The Grange" in Jamaica from his uncle, which he sold by 1804. Kinloch purchased what is now Carnoustie from a Major Philip in 1808 for 11000 pounds and promoted development by starting a brickworks and providing grants for prospective residents who wished to take up feus.

His first involvement with politics was in 1814 and involved the extension of the harbour in Dundee, a project which earned him the gratitude of business interests in the city. His involvement with mass meetings in 1817 and 1819 agitating for Parliamentary reform attracted less favorable attention, and he was forced to flee to France and was declared an outlaw. In 1822 his daughter was presented to George IV in Edinburgh and interceded for him, and he was able to return.

When Dundee was given representation in Parliament by the Reform Act 1832, Kinloch was elected MP. His 1831 speech to voters included his anti-slavery views. He died in London two months after the start of Parliament; his body was brought back to Scotland for burial at the Kinloch Chapel at Meigle.

== Artistic recognition ==
A statue of Kinloch by John Steell was erected in 1872 in Albert Square in Dundee. Although the composition is weak it links to the axial view along Reform Street to its south, named in relation to the Reform Act.

A painting of Kinloch by Hugh Collins was done many years after his death. A street in Dundee, Kinloch Place, is named in his honor.

== Family ==
Kinloch married Helen Smyth, daughter of John Smyth of Balhary in Perthshire. They had eight children: George (1800–1881); John (1802–1828); Cecilia (1797–1879); Margaret (died 1830); Helen (c. 1799–1823); Ann (c. 1801–1865); Eliza (c. 1804–1822); and Jemima Joanna (d. 1805). A lawyer and magistrate, George Kinloch the younger received a baronetcy in 1873. A grandson, Sir John Kinloch (1849–1910), was also an MP.

Parliament of the United Kingdom
New constituency	Member of Parliament for Dundee; 1832 – 1833	Succeeded by Sir Henry Parnell, Bt
