= Sir Francis Kinloch, 3rd Baronet =

Scottish landowner (1676–1747)

Sir Francis Kinloch of Gilmerton, 3rd Baronet (23 June 1676 – 2 March 1747) was a Scottish landowner.

== Early life ==
Kinloch was the son and heir of Sir Francis Kinloch, 2nd Baronet, of Gilmerton, and Mary Leslie, daughter of David Leslie, 1st Lord Newark. He was a member of a noble family whose ancestry is displayed in The Plantagenet Roll of the Blood Royal.

== Career ==
Kinloch succeeded his father in 1699 and inherited the family seat, Gilmerton House, about a mile east-north-east of Athelstaneford, East Lothian.

== Personal life ==
Around 1705, Kinloch married Mary Rochead, daughter and co-heiress of Sir James Rochead, 1st Baronet of Inverleith. Mary's sister, Janet Rochead, married Alexander Murray of Melgund and, after his death, Sir David Dalrymple, 1st Baronet. Together, Mary and Francis were the parents of three sons and three daughters:

- Sir James Kinloch, 4th Baronet, of Gilmerton (1705–1778).
- Sir David Kinloch, 5th Baronet, of Gilmerton (1710–1795).
- Alexander Rocheid of Inverleith (d. 1755).
- Janet Kinloch, who married Charles Broun, an advocate.
- Mary Kinloch, who married Alexander Hamilton of Beil, near Stenton.
- Magdalen Kinloch, who married John Wilkie of Foulden, Berwickshire, in 1745.

Sir Francis died on 2 March 1747 and Lady Kinloch died on 2 April 1749 at Gilmerton House. Sir Francis was succeeded in the baronetcy by his son James, although he lived all his adult life in Switzerland. Following Sir James' death in 1778, his second son David inherited the baronetcy.

=== Descendants ===
His grandson, Sir Francis Kinloch, 6th Baronet FRSE FSA was notoriously murdered by his younger brother Archibald Kinloch in 1795 in order to inherit the baronetcy.

Baronetage of Nova Scotia
Preceded by Francis Kinloch	Baronet (of Gilmerton); 1699–1747	Succeeded by James Kinloch
