= Kinloch baronets =

Set index for Kinloch baronets

There have been three baronetcies created for persons with the surname Kinloch, two in the Baronetage of Nova Scotia and one in the Baronetage of the United Kingdom. As of 2026 two of the creations are extant.

- Kinloch baronets of Kinloch (1st creation, 1685)
- Kinloch baronets of Gilmerton (1686)
- Kinloch baronets of Kinloch (2nd creation, 1873)
