= William Tell discography =

This is a partial discography of William Tell (French: Guillaume Tell), an opera with music by Gioachino Rossini and a French libretto by Etienne de Jouy and Hippolyte Bis. The work was first performed on 3 August 1829 by the Paris Opera at the Salle Le Peletier. It was first performed in Italian as Guglielmo Tell in Germany on 28–29 January 1831 in Dresden and in Italy on 17 September 1831 in Lucca (translated by Calisto Bassi).

== French original as Guillaume Tell ==
| Year | Cast: Guillaume Tell, Arnold Melchtal, Walter Furst, Jemmy, Hedwige, Gessler, Mathilde, Ruodi, Rodolphe, Leuthold | Conductor, Opera House and Orchestra | Label |
|---|---|---|---|
| 1972 | Gabriel Bacquier, Nicolai Gedda, Kolos Kováts, Mady Mesplé, Jocelyne Taillon, Louis Hendrikx, Montserrat Caballé, Charles Burles, Ricardo Cassinelli, Leslie Fyson | Lamberto Gardelli, Royal Philharmonic Orchestra, Ambrosian Opera Chorus | Audio CD: EMI CMS; Cat: 7 69951–2; Angel; Cat: CDMD 69951 |
| 1998 | Thomas Hampson, Giuseppe Sabbatini, Wojtek Smilek, Dawn Kotoski, Michaela Ungureanu, Egils Silins, Nancy Gustafson, Mathias Zachariassen, John Dickie, Yu Chen | Fabio Luisi, Chorus and Orchestra of the Vienna State Opera (Recorded live on 24 October, incomplete) | Audio CD: Orfeo d'Or; Cat: C640 0530 |
| 2011 | Gerald Finley, John Osborn, Matthew Rose, Elena Xanthoudakis, Marie-Nicole Lemieux, Carlo Cigni, Malin Byström | Antonio Pappano, Orchestra and Chorus of the Accademia Nazionale di Santa Cecilia, incomplete | Audio CD: EMI, Cat: |
| 2013 | Andrew Foster Williams, Michael Spyres, Nahuel di Pierro, Tara Stafford, Alessandra Volpe, Raffaele Facciolà, Judith Howarth | Antonino Fogliani, Virtuosi Brunensis, Bach Chamber Choir Poznan, (First totally uncut version recorded live during the XXVth Belcanto Opera Festival Rossini in Wildbad 2013) | Audio CD NAXOS 8.660363-66, (including the omitted or alternative numbers and the new finale of the three-act version) |
| 2015 | Nicola Alaima, Juan Diego Flórez, Simon Orfila, Amanda Forsythe, Veronia Sieoni, Luca Tittoto, Marina Rebeka, Celso Albelo, Alessandro Luciano, Wojtek Gierlach | Michele Mariotti, Teatro Comunale di Bologna orchestra and chorus, Graham Vick, stage director | Video DVD Decca Records; Cat:0743871 |
| 2017 | Gerald Finley, John Osborn, Alexander Vinogradov, Sofia Fomina, Enkelejda Shkosa, Nicolas Courjal, Malin Byström, Enea Scala, Michael Colvin, Samuel Dale Johnson | Antonio Pappano, The Royal Opera orchestra and chorus, Damiano Michieletto, stage director | DVD:Opus Arte; Cat:OABD7195D |

== Italian translation as Guglielmo Tell ==
| Year | Cast: Guglielmo Tell, Arnoldo, Valter, Melchtal, Jemmy, Eduige, Gessler, Matilde, Ruodi, Rodolfo, Leutoldo | Conductor, Opera House and Orchestra | Label |
|---|---|---|---|
| 1952 | Giuseppe Taddei, Mario Filippeschi, Giorgio Tozzi, Plinio Clabassi, Graziella Sciutti, Miti Truccato Pace, Fernando Corena, Rosanna Carteri, Tommaso Soley, Antonio Pirino, Mario Zorgniotti | Mario Rossi, Orchestra and Chorus of Radio Italiana, Milan (Recording of a performance with cuts, broadcast on 8 March) | Audio CD: Warner Fonit; Cat: 8573 87489-2 |
| 1956 | Dietrich Fischer-Dieskau, Gianni Jaia, Giuseppe Modesti, Ivan Sardi, Jolanda Mancini, Giannella Borelli, Enrico Campi, Anita Cerquetti, Tommaso Soley, Antonio Pirino, Sergio Nicolai | Mario Rossi, Orchestra and Chorus of Radio Italiana, Milan (Broadcast on 5 September) | Audio CD: Myto; Cat: 3MCD 001 212; Andromeda; Cat: ANDRCD 5045 |
| 1965 | Giangiacomo Guelfi, Gianni Raimondi, Paolo Washington, Bruno Marangoni, Leyla Bersiani, Anna Maria Rota, Silviano Pagliuca, Leyla Gencer, Enrico Campi | Fernando Previtali, Orchestra and Chorus of the Teatro di San Carlo, Naples (Recorded live on 11 December) | Audio CD: Great Opera Performances; Cat: G.O.P. 715; Opera d'Oro; Cat: OPD 1461 |
| 1972 | Norman Mittelmann, Nicolai Gedda, Mario Rinaudo, Agostino Ferrin, Flora Rafanelli, Maria Casula, Luigi Roni, Eva Marton, Vittorio Terranova, Dino Formichini, Giorgio Giorgetti | Riccardo Muti, Maggio Musicale Fiorentino Orchestra and Chorus, Florence | CD: Gala Records, Cat: 100616 |
| 1978-9 | Sherrill Milnes, Luciano Pavarotti, Nicolai Ghiaurov, John Tomlinson, Della Jones, Elizabeth Connell, Ferruccio Mazzoli, Mirella Freni, Piero di Palma, Cesar Antonio Suarez, Richard van Allan | Riccardo Chailly, National Philharmonic Orchestra, Ambrosian Opera Chorus | Audio CD: Decca (London); Cat: 417 154–2; Decca; Cat: 475 7723 |
| 1988 | Giorgio Zancanaro, Chris Merritt, Giorgio Surjan, Franco De Grandis, Amelia Felle, Luciana D' Intino, Luigi Roni, Cheryl Studer | Riccardo Muti, Orchestra and Chorus of the Teatro alla Scala, Milan (Recorded live in December) | Audio CD: Philips; Cat: 422-391-2; DVD: Image Entertainments; Cat: ID 4357; Opus Arte; Cat: OA LS 3002 D; Opus Arte; Cat: OA 3001 |

== German translation as Wilhelm Tell ==
| Year | Cast Wilhelm Tell, Arnold, Melchtal, Jemmy, Hedwig, Ruodi, Matilda | Conductor, Opera house and Orchestra | Label |
|---|---|---|---|
| 1953 | Theodor Horand, Gert Lutze, Hellmuth Kaphahn, Margarete Hahnkamm, Elisabeth Holtkamp, Heinz Holzke, Annaliese Schubert-Heuhaus | Herbert Kegel, Leipzig Symphony Orchestra and Chorus | Audio CD: Walhall; Cat: 0239 |
