= Sombre forêt =

"Sombre forêt" ("Dark Forest") is a soprano aria from act two of the opera William Tell by Gioachino Rossini, to a French libretto by Étienne de Jouy and Hippolyte Bis. It is sung by Mathilde, a princess of the House of Habsburg, as she waits in the forest on the heights of Rütli for her Swiss lover, Arnold Melchthal.

This aria represents an important development in the traditional form of the strophic romance aria. By expanding somewhat the traditionally minimal accompaniment, Rossini developed what has been called a "Gallo-Italian hybrid" that provided an important model for his contemporaries.

== Libretto ==
French
[Recitative]
Ils s'éloignent enfin; j'ai cru le reconnaître:
Mon cœur n'a point trompé mes yeux;
Il a suivi mes pas, il est près de ces lieux.
Je tremble!...s'il allait paraître!
Quel est ce sentiment profond, mystérieux
Dont je nourris l'ardeur, que je chéris peut-être?
Arnold! Arnold! est-ce bien toi?
Simple habitant de ces campagnes,
L'espoir, l'orgueil de tes montagnes,
Qui charme ma pensée et cause mon effroi?
Ah! que je puisse au moins l'avouer moi-même!
Melcthal, c'est toi que j'aime;
Sans toi j'aurais perdu le jour;
Et ma reconnaissance excuse mon amour.

[Aria]
Sombre forêt, désert triste et sauvage,
Je vous préfère aux splendeurs des palais:
C'est sur les monts, au séjour de l'orage,
Que mon cœur peut renaître à la paix;
Mais l'écho seulement apprendra mes secrets.
Toi, du berger astre doux et timide,
Qui, sur mes pas, viens semant tes reflets,
Ah! sois aussi mon étoile et mon guide!
Comme lui tes rayons sont discrets,
Et l'écho seulement redira mes secrets.

English
[Recitative]
They go at last, I thought I saw him:
My heart has not deceived my eyes;
He followed my steps, he is near this place.
I tremble!...if he were to appear!
What is this feeling, deep, mysterious
I nourished the ardour, which I cherish perhaps?
Arnold! Arnold! is it really you?
Simple inhabitant of these fields,
The hope and pride of the mountains
That charms my mind and causes my fear?
Ah! I can at least admit to myself!
Melcthal, it's you I love;
Without you I would have lost the day;
And my gratitude excuses my love.

[Aria]
Dark forest, wilderness sad and wild,
I prefer you to the splendours of the palace:
It is on the mountains, the place of the storm
That my heart can regain peace;
And only the echo will learn my secrets.
You, the sweet and shy star of the shepherd,
Whose light illuminates my footsteps,
Ah! be also my star and my guide!
Like him, your rays are discrete,
And only the echo will repeat my secrets.

Italian
[Recitative]
S'allontanano alfine! Io sperai rivederlo,
E il cor non m'ha ingannata,
Ei mi seguìa... lontano esser non puote...
Io tremo... ohimè!.. se qui venisse mai!
Onde l'arcano sentimento estremo
Di cui nutro l'ardor, ch'amo fors'anco!
Arnoldo! Arnoldo! ah! sei pur tu ch'io bramo.
Semplice abitator di questi campi,
Di questi monti caro orgoglio e speme,
Sei tu sol che incanti il mio pensiero,
Che il mio timor cagioni. Oh! almen ch'io possa
Confessarlo a me stessa... io t'amo, Arnoldo!
Tu i giorni miei salvasti,
E l'amor più possente in me destasti.

[Aria]
Selva opaca, deserta brughiera
Qual piacer la tua vista mi dà.
Sovra i monti ove il turbine impera
Alla calma il mio cor s'aprirà.
L'eco sol le mie pene udirà.
Tu, bell'astro, al cui dolce riflesso
Il mio passo vagante sen va,
Tu m'addita ove Arnoldo s'aggira;
A lui solo il mio cuor s'aprirà,
Esso sol le mie pene udirà.
