= Joseph Aurèle de Bossi =

French politician and poet (1758–1824)

- Born: Joseph Aurèle Charles de Bossi; 15 November 1758; Turin
- Died: 20 January 1824 (aged 65); Paris
- Occupations: Politician; Poet
- Spouse: Anne Spanzotti

Signature
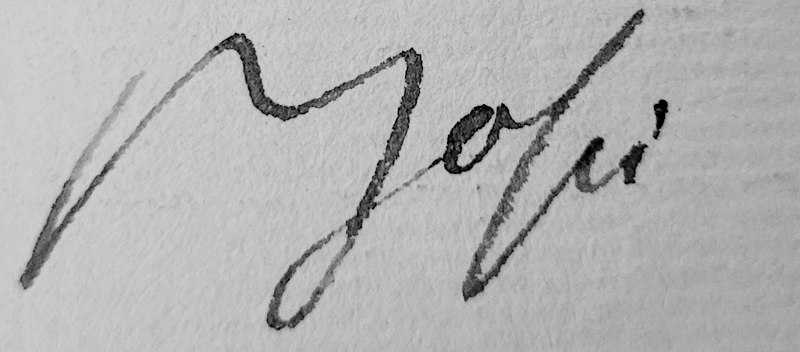

Joseph Aurèle Charles de Bossi (15 November 1758 – 20 January 1824) was a French politician and poet.

== Biography ==
Bossi studied law under Professor Carlo Denina whom he befriended. Dealing simultaneously with literature, he gave two tragedies at the age of 18, the Circassians and Rhea-Sylvia which were well received. Then he published Odes on the reforms of Joseph II, on the death of the young prince of Brunswick, on American Independence, the pacification of Holland, which increased his poet's reputation, but the philosophical sentiments contained in the odes displeased the court of Turin, and undermined his advancement in a first time.

However he was appointed Secretary of Legation at Genoa, then undersecretary for foreign affairs, before being chargé d'affaires to the Russian court, where he remained until the signing of the armistice of Cherasco between Sardinia and France, on 28 April 1796, when the Tsar Paul I ordered him to leave Russia.

When the French invaded Italy in 1796, he showed willingness to serve and participated in the negotiations of the Treaty of Campo Formio. In 1799, General Joubert appointed him a member of the provisional government of Piedmont, as undersecretary of Foreign Affairs. After the battle of Marengo, he went to Holland to meet the resident functions. When he learned of the Piedmont states sale that had been made to France, he went to Turin and determined the heads of the Italian party for the meeting. When the Austro-Russians penetrated in Italy, he retired into the valleys of the Alps, where he received the most generous hospitality. In order to recognize this welcome, Bossi signaled his entry into the government by an act which gave the Vaudois full freedom of worship.

He contributes a lot to the final integration of Piedmont to France, and the First Consul reflected his satisfaction with a flattering letter. Nevertheless, he merely named him resident in Moldova. Bossi, who expected to be employed in the administration refused and would be forgotten for 18 months. After this time he was called to the prefecture of Ain in 1805, then to that of Manche 12 February 1810 until 16 July 1815.

Made a baron of the Empire by Napoléon 9 March 1809, Louis XVIII kept him in office at the Bourbon Restoration and granted him letters of naturalization, but his eagerness to recognize Bonaparte on his return from Elba, led to his dismissal.

After traveling for some time in northern Europe, he settled at 14 rue Saint-Martin (former 5th arrondissement of Paris), where he died. An officier of the Légion d'honneur, he is buried at Père Lachaise Cemetery. From Anne Spanzotti, married 5 November 1806 in Bourg-en-Bresse, he had a daughter named Heloise, born on 14 July 1809 in Bourg-en-Bresse, who first married with Eugène Leroux. Widowed, she remarried with Caesar-Maurice de la Tour d'Auvergne, and had the Carmel of the Pater Noster built in Jerusalem.

His poems were collected, Turin, 1801 3 small vol., and reprinted in London in 1814 to 50 copies only, with a poem entitled Oromasia, and whose subject is the French Revolution. Despite the independence of the author, the poem was in favor of Bonaparte. There is strength in ideas, but the versification is lackluster and the general effect monotonous. Both editions were published under the anagrammatic names "Albo Crisso".

== Sources ==
- Arnault, Antoine-Vincent; de Jouy, Étienne; de Norvins, Jacques Marquet (1821). Biographie nouvelle des contemporains;ou Dictionnaire historique et raisonné de tous les hommes qui, depuis la révolution française, ont acquis de la célébrité par leurs actions, leurs écrits, leurs erreurs ou leurs crimes, soit en France, soit dans les pays étrangers, précédée d'un tableau par ordre chronologique des époques célèbres et des événemens remarquables, tant en France qu'à l'étranger, depuis 1787 jusqu'à ce jour, et d'une table alphabétique des assemblées législatives, à partir de l'assemblée constituante jusqu'aux dernières chambres des pairs et des députés (in French). Vol. 3. Paris: Librairie historique. pp. 302–6..
