= Working in layers =

Working in layers is a system for creating artistic paintings that involve the use of more than one layer of paint.

== Oil painting ==
Working in layers is used extensively in oil painting for paintings that require more than one session. For a painting that develops over several days, allowing for the oil paint to dry for a given layer, it is helpful to work with explicit painting layers. The first layer may be a ground, usually applied all over the surface. Then an underdrawing in outline may follow. Then comes underpainting, overpainting, and finally semi-transparent glazes and varnish. All of these layers will affect the appearance of the final painting. To understand the role of underpainting, one can use metaphor and think of the underpainting as a base-rhythm in music, and the overpainting as a solo played over this. Areas not underpainted, outlining the space for a figure for example, are said to be reserved.

== History ==
Working in layers has been utilized by many schools of art over many centuries. For example, in the early 15th century Cennino D'Andrea Cennini describes how to paint in layers in the egg tempera medium.

== Today ==
Modern techniques such as X-rays and infra-red reflectograms often enable lower layers of paint and underdrawing to be seen, and reveal pentimenti, or changes of mind by the artist in the course of work.
