= William Tell (opera) =

1829 opera by Gioachino Rossini

Guillaume Tell William Tell
- Opera by Gioachino Rossini
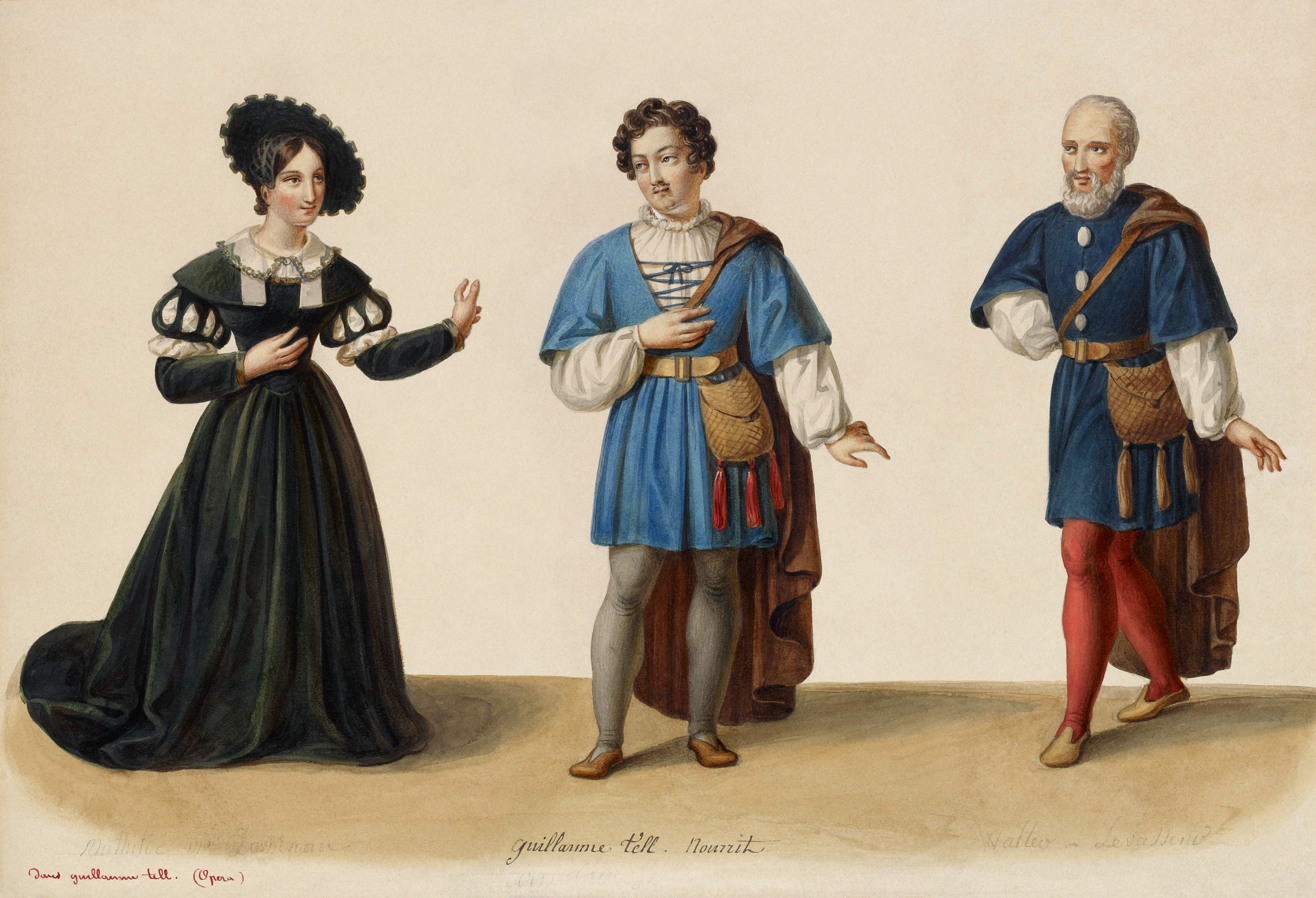
- Costume designs by Eugène Du Faget for the original production: Laure Cinti-Damoreau as Mathilde, Adolphe Nourrit as Arnold Melchtal, and Nicolas Levasseur as Walter Furst
- Librettist: Étienne de Jouy; Hippolyte Bis
- Language: French
- Based on: Wilhelm Tell by Friedrich Schiller
- Premiere: 3 August 1829; Salle Le Peletier, Paris

William Tell (French: Guillaume Tell; Italian: Guglielmo Tell) is a French-language opera in four acts by Italian composer Gioachino Rossini to a libretto by Victor-Joseph Étienne de Jouy and L. F. Bis, based on Friedrich Schiller's play Wilhelm Tell, which, in turn, drew on the William Tell legend. The opera was Rossini's last, although he lived for nearly 40 more years. Fabio Luisi said that Rossini planned for Guillaume Tell to be his last opera even as he composed it. The often-performed overture in four sections features a depiction of a storm and a vivacious finale, the "March of the Swiss Soldiers".

Paris Opéra archivist Charles Malherbe discovered the original orchestral score of the opera in the hands of a second-hand bookseller, resulting in its being acquired by the Paris Conservatoire in 1898.

== Performance history ==
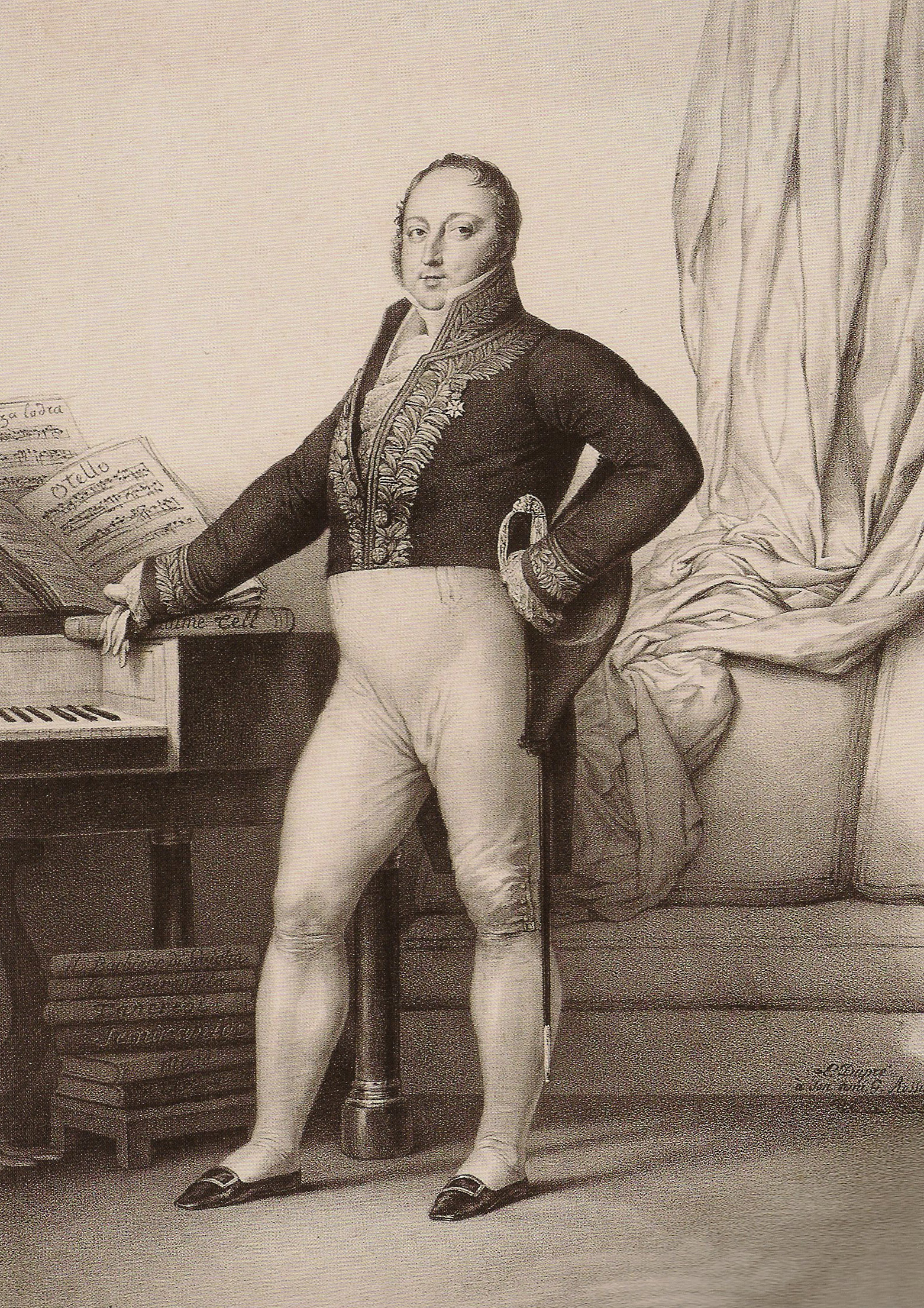
1829 lithograph of Rossini

Guillaume Tell was first performed by the Paris Opéra at the Salle Le Peletier on 3 August 1829, but within three performances cuts were being made and after a year only three acts were performed. The opera's length, roughly four hours of music, and casting requirements, such as the high range required for the tenor part, have contributed to the difficulty of producing the work. When performed, the opera is often cut. Performances have been given in both French and Italian. Political concerns have also contributed to the varying fortunes of the work.

In Italy, because the work glorified a revolutionary figure against authority, the opera encountered difficulties with the Italian censors, and the number of productions in Italy was limited. The Teatro San Carlo produced the opera in 1833, but then did not give another production for around 50 years. The first Venice production, at the Teatro La Fenice, was not until 1856. By contrast, in Vienna, in spite of censorship problems there, the Vienna Court Opera gave 422 performances over the years 1830 to 1907. As Hofer, or the Tell of the Tyrol, the opera was first performed at Drury Lane in London on 1 May 1830 (in English), with a production in Italian following in 1839 at Her Majesty's, and in French at Covent Garden in 1845. In New York, William Tell was first presented on 19 September 1831. It was revived at the Metropolitan Opera in 1923 with Rosa Ponselle and Giovanni Martinelli, and there were revivals during the 1930s in Milan, Rome, Paris, Berlin and Florence. When the opera was performed at Gran Teatre del Liceu (Barcelona) in 1893, an anarchist threw two Orsini bombs in the theatre.

In the later 20th century there were major productions in Florence (1972), Geneva (1979, 1991), La Scala (1988), Théâtre des Champs-Élysées (1989), Covent Garden (1990), and then Opéra Bastille (2003) as well as at the Sportspalace in Pesaro (lasting over 5 hours, 1995). In 2010 there was an important revival of the opera, when it opened the Accademia Nazionale di Santa Cecilia's season, under Antonio Pappano. This performance was of the French version, with some cuts to particularly the fourth act (which Pappano noted had been approved by Rossini himself). A live recording of this concert performance was released in 2011, and the production was transferred to The Proms in July of that year, with Michele Pertusi taking on the title role, Patricia Bardon as Hedwige, Nicolas Courjal as Gessler, and Mark Stone as Leuthold. The performance was very well reviewed, and marked the first full performance of the work in the history of the Proms.

A co-production by the Dutch National Opera and the Metropolitan Opera New York of the opera in the original French opened at the Met in October 2016 with Gerald Finley in the title role.

According to an anecdote, when an admirer told the composer that he had heard his opera the previous night, Rossini replied "What? The whole of it?". Another version of the story refers only to act 2. In 1864 Offenbach quoted the patriotic trio from act 2, "Lorsque la Grèce est un champ de carnage" in La belle Hélène.

== Overture ==
Overture
Chicago Symphony Orchestra, Fritz Reiner conducting (1959)

The famous overture to the opera is often heard independently of the complete work. Its high-energy finale, "March of the Swiss Soldiers", is particularly familiar through its use in the American radio and television shows of The Lone Ranger. The overture was prominently featured in the 1935 Walt Disney cartoon The Band Concert starring Mickey Mouse and Donald Duck. Several portions of the overture were used prominently in the films A Clockwork Orange and The Eagle Shooting Heroes; in addition, Dmitri Shostakovich quotes the main theme of the finale in the first movement of his 15th symphony. The overture has four parts, each linked to the next:

- "The Prelude (Dawn)" is written only for the cello section (including parts for five soloists), the double basses, and the timpani, in a slow tempo and in E major.
- "The Storm" is a dynamic section played by the full orchestra, with backup from the trombones, in E minor.
- The "Ranz des Vaches", or "call to the dairy cows", features the cor anglais (English horn) and the flute. It is in G major.
- The finale ("March of the Swiss Soldiers") is an ultra-dynamic "cavalry charge" galop heralded by horns and trumpets, and is played by the full orchestra in E major.

== Roles ==
Roles, voice types, premiere cast
| Role | Voice type | Premiere cast, 3 August 1829 Conductor: Henri Valentino |
|---|---|---|
| Guillaume Tell | baritone | Henri-Bernard Dabadie |
| Hedwige, his wife | mezzo-soprano | Mlle Mori |
| Jemmy, his son | soprano | Zulmé Dabadie |
| Mathilde, a Habsburg princess | soprano | Laure Cinti-Damoreau |
| Arnold Melchtal | tenor | Adolphe Nourrit |
| Melchtal, his father | bass | Monsieur Bonel |
| Gesler, the Austrian Governor of the cantons of Uri and Schwyz | bass | Alexandre Prévost |
| Walter Furst | bass | Nicolas Levasseur |
| Ruodi, a fisherman | tenor | Alexis Dupont |
| Leuthold, a shepherd | bass | Ferdinand Prévôt |
| Rodolphe, Captain of Gesler's guard | tenor | Jean-Étienne-Auguste Massol |
| A hunter | baritone | Beltrame Pouilley |
Peasants, shepherds, knights, pages, ladies, soldiers, bridal couples

== Instrumentation ==
The instrumentation is:

- Woodwinds: a piccolo, a flute, 2 oboes (1st doubles cor anglais), 2 clarinets in A and 2 bassoons
- Brass: 4 horns (2 in G and 2 in E), 4 trumpets in E and 3 trombones
- Percussion: 2 timpani, triangle, bass drum, cymbals, bell and tam-tam
- Strings: first violins, second violins, viola, violoncelli, double basses, 2 harps
- On stage: 4 horns

== Synopsis ==
Place: Austrian-occupied Switzerland
Time: 13th century

=== Act 1 ===
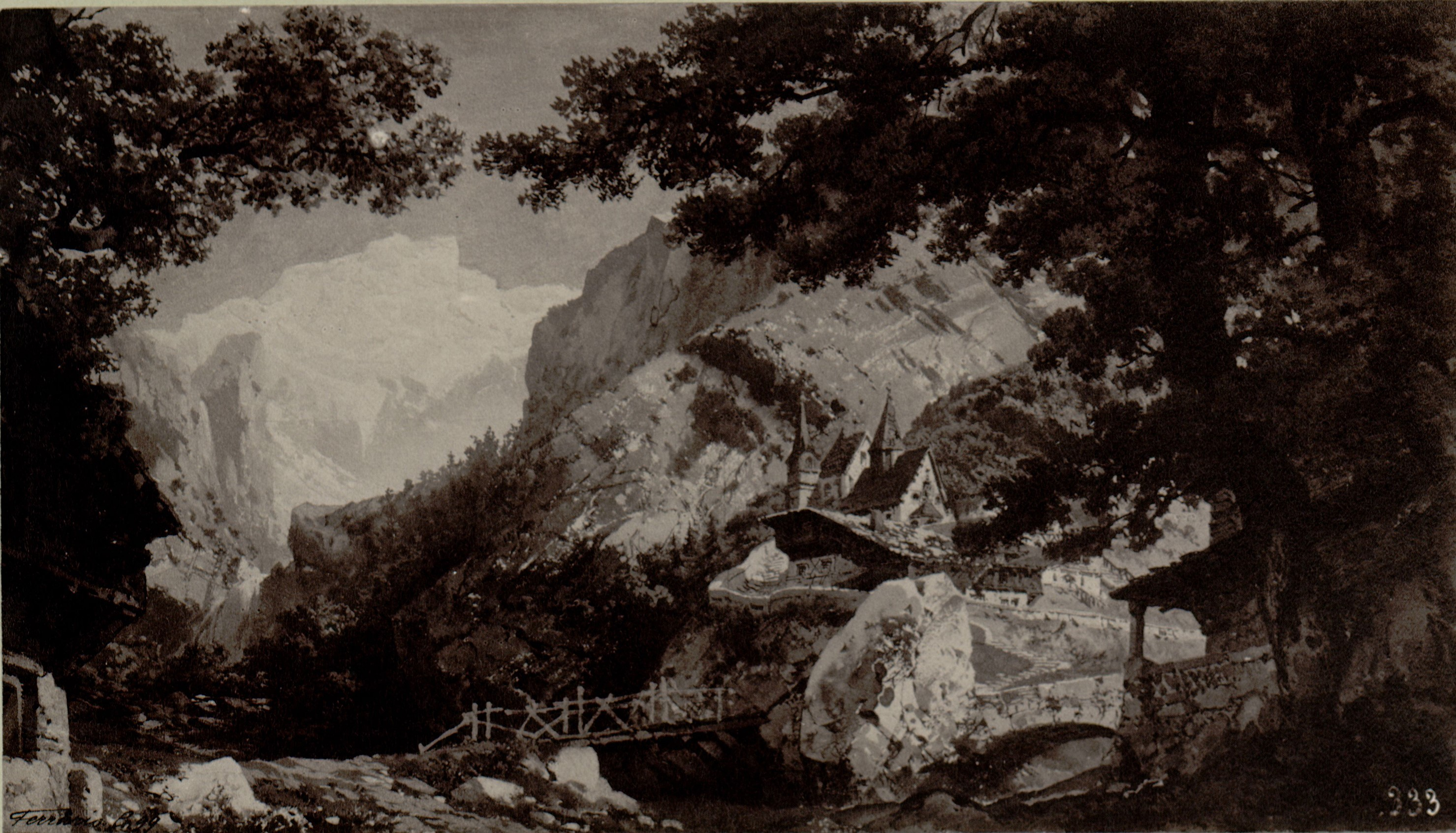
A Mountain Village, set design for Guglielmo Tell, act 1 scene 1 (1899)

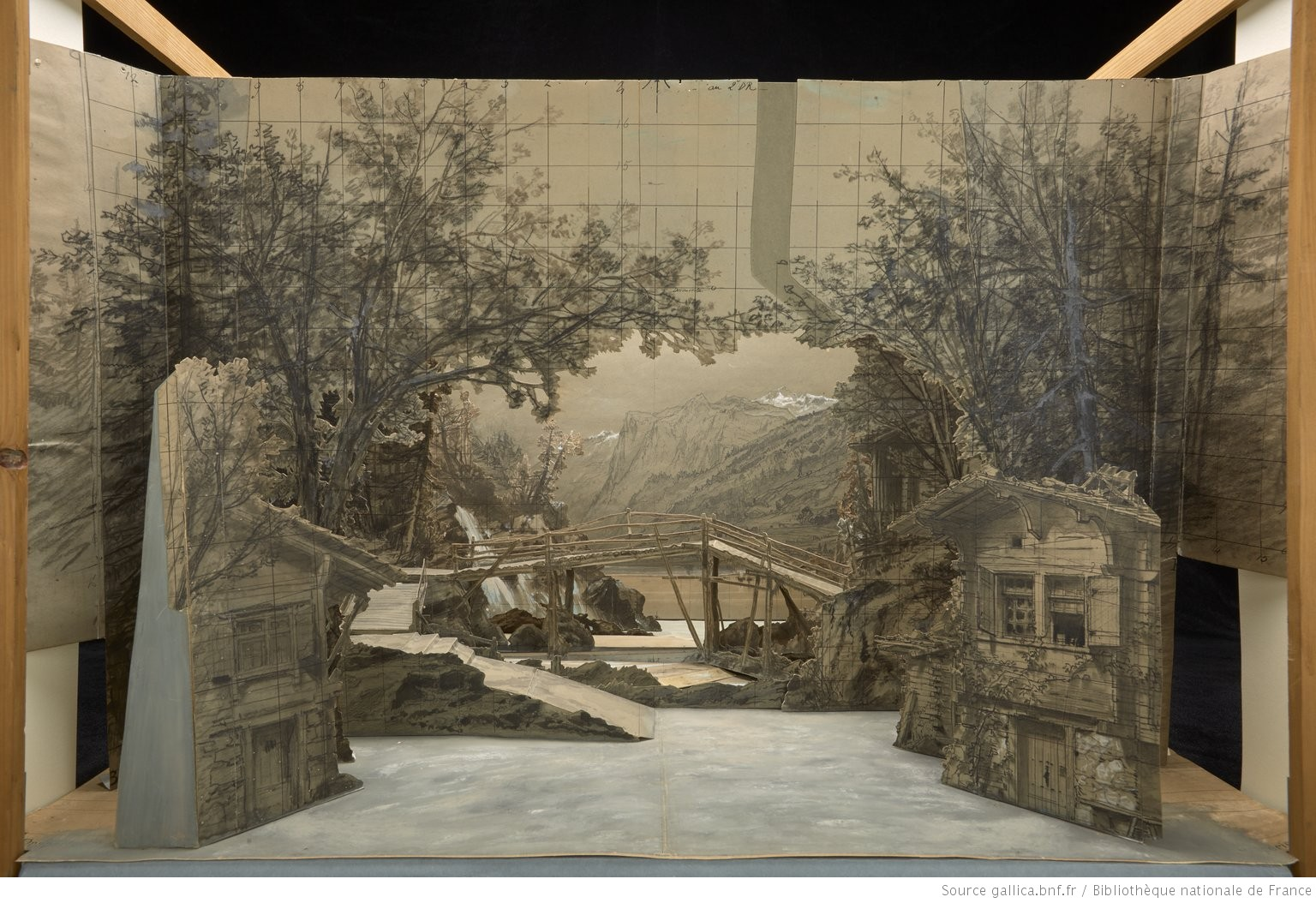
Set design for act 1 in a 19th-century production

By the shore of Lake Lucerne, at Bürglen in the canton of Uri

It is the day of the Shepherd Festival, in May, near Lake Lucerne. The action opens on an idyllic scene, with the local peasants busily preparing chalets for three newly wedded couples, singing as they work (Quel jour serein le ciel présage – "What a serene day the sky foretells"). The fisherman, Ruodi, sings a gentle love song from his boat (to orchestral accompaniment from the harps and flutes). Tell stands apart from the general merriment and laments Switzerland's continued oppression by the Austrian Habsburgs (Il chante, et l'Helvétie pleure sa liberté – "He sings, and Helvetia mourns her liberty"). His wife and son add their own interpretation of Ruodi's song, presaging the coming nautical dramas.

The activities are interrupted by the ranz des vaches resounding from the hills (often performed by off-stage horns, and echoing in its theme the ranz de vaches in the opera's overture). The horns also signal the arrival of Melchthal, a respected elder of the canton. He is persuaded by Hedwige to bless the couples at the celebration. However, his son Arnold, though of marriageable age, is not participating and is evidently uncomfortable. The entire on-stage cast sings in celebration (Célebrons tous en ce beau jour, le travail, l'hymen et l'amour – "Let all celebrate, on this glorious day, work, marriage and love"). Tell invites Melchthal into his chalet; before they move off, Melchthal chides his son for his failure to marry.

His father's rebuke provokes an outpouring of despair from Arnold: in his recitative we learn of his previous service in the forces of the Austrian rulers, his rescue of Mathilde from an avalanche, and the conflict between his love for her and his shame at serving the "perfidious power". Horn fanfares herald the approach of Gesler, the Austrian governor, whom the Swiss detest, and his entourage. Arnold moves off to greet their arrival, as Mathilde will accompany them, but is stopped by Tell. Inquiring as to where Arnold is going, Tell persuades him to consider joining the planned rebellion against the governor. The expressive duet in which this takes place again shows the tension Arnold feels between his love for Mathilde and the "fatherland" (Ah! Mathilde, idole de mon âme!...Ô ma patrie, mon cœur te sacrifie... – "Ah, Mathilde, idol of my soul...O my fatherland, my heart sacrifices to you..."). By the end of the exchange, Arnold is prepared to confront Gesler the moment he arrives; Tell persuades him to at least let the festival pass in peace, but knows he has gained a convert to the cause of freedom.

The villagers then reassemble, and Melchthal blesses the couples. The blessing is followed by singing, dancing and an archery contest that Tell's young son Jemmy wins with his first shot – a result of his "paternal heritage". It is Jemmy who notices the hurried approach of the pale, trembling and wounded shepherd, Leuthold, who killed one of Gesler's soldiers to defend his daughter and is fleeing the governor's forces. He seeks to escape to the opposite shore, but the cowardly Ruodi refuses to take him in his boat, fearing that the current and the rocks make approaching the opposite bank impossible. Tell returns from searching for the departed Arnold just in time: even as the soldiers approach, calling for Leuthold's blood, Tell takes Leuthold into the boat and out onto the water. Gesler's guards arrive, led by Rodolphe, who is further incensed by the villagers' prayers and their evident joy at the escape. Melchthal urges the villagers not to tell Rodolphe who it was who aided Leuthold, and is taken prisoner by the guards. As Rodolphe and the soldiers promise retribution (Que du ravage, que du pillage sur ce rivage pèse l'horreur!), Tell's family and friends take comfort in Tell's skills as an archer, which will surely save them.

=== Act 2 ===
On the heights of Rütli, overlooking the Lake and the Cantons

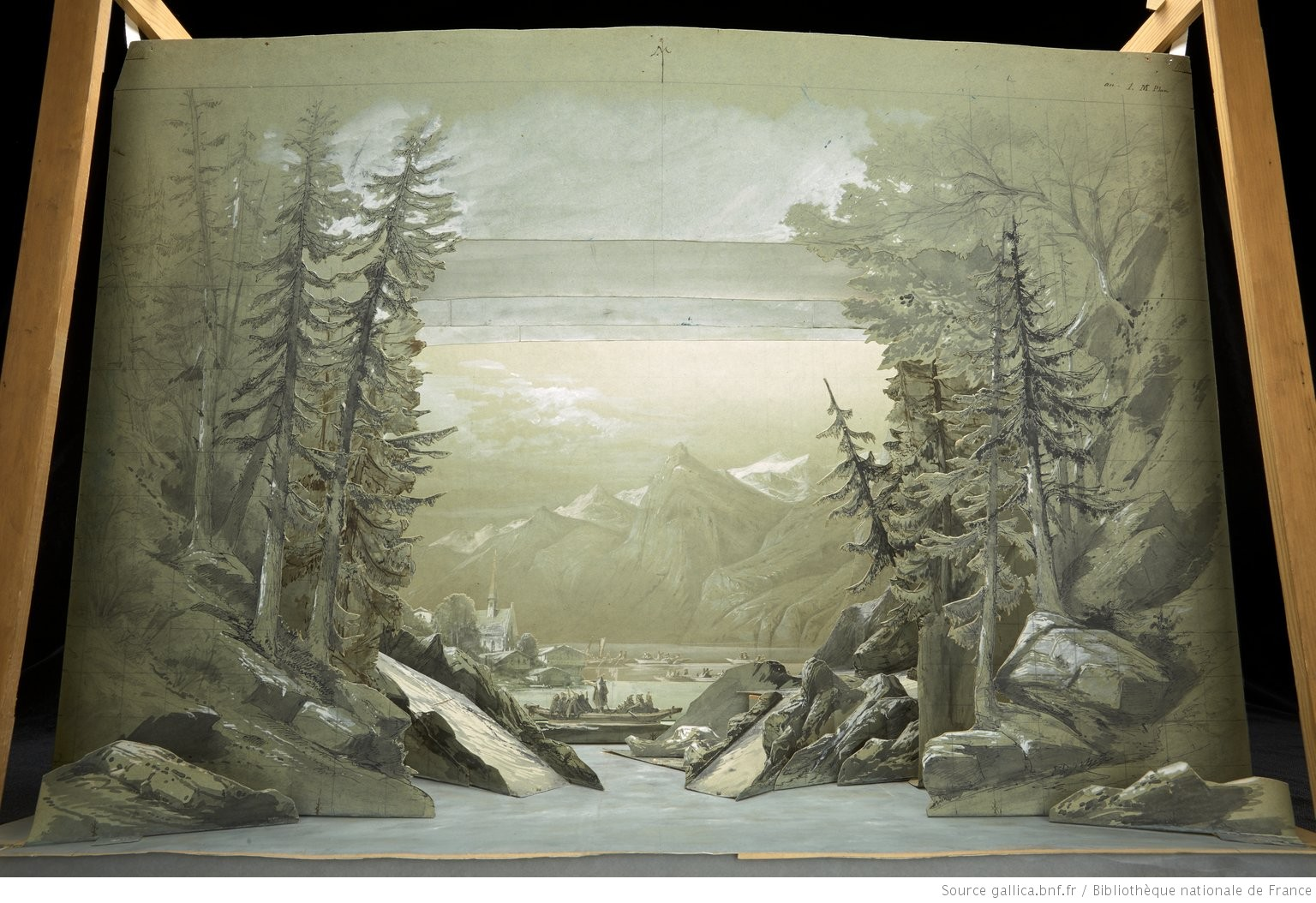
Set design for act 2 by Charles-Antoine Cambon

A hunting party of ladies and gentlemen, accompanied by soldiers, hears the sound of the shepherds returning from the hills as night approaches. Hearing the Governor's horns, they too take their leave. Mathilde, however, lingers, believing she has glimpsed Arnold in the vicinity. She is, like Arnold, anguished by the love she feels for her rescuer, and contemplates it as she sings (Sombre forêt, désert triste et sauvage – "Somber forest, sad and savage wilderness"). Arnold appears, and each confesses to the other their desire for this meeting. In their duet (Oui, vous l'arrachez à mon âme – "Yes, you wring from my soul"), they recognise their mutual passion, but also the obstacles they face. Urging him to "return to the fields of glory", Mathilde assures him of the eventual acceptability of his suit, and leaves at the approach of Tell and Walter. They question Arnold as to why he loves Mathilde, a member of the oppressing Austrians. Arnold, offended by their spying, declares his intention to continue fighting for the Austrians, and thus gain glory, rather than liberty. However, when Walter tells him that Gesler has executed his father Melchthal, Arnold vows revenge (Qu'entends-je? ô crime! – "What do I hear? O crime!").

As the three men affirm their dedication – "to independence or death" – they hear the sound of someone else approaching. It is the men of the canton of Unterwalden coming to join the fight, and describing their journey in a rather gentle refrain (Nous avons su braver). In quick succession, they are joined by the men of Schwyz (En ces temps de malheurs) and Uri (Guillaume, tu le vois). The gathering is complete, and the tone and tempo of the finale rises as the men of the three cantons affirm their willingness to fight or die for the freedom of Switzerland (Jurons, jurons par nos dangers – "Let us swear, let us swear by our dangers"). Plans are made to arm the cantons and to rise up when "the beacons of vengeance burn".

=== Act 3 ===
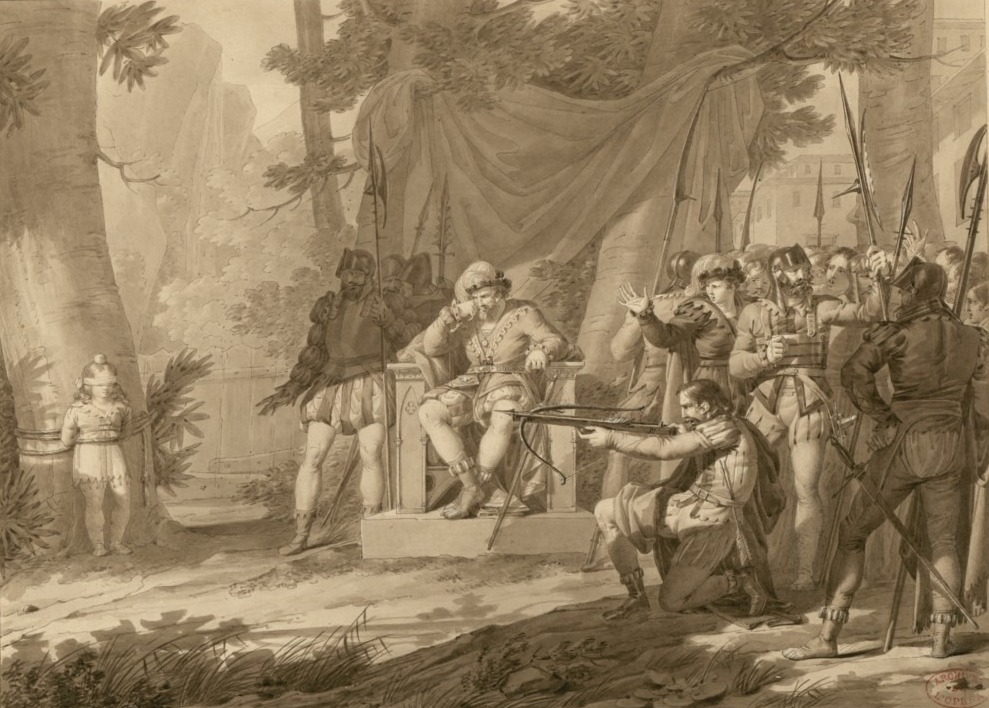
Tell prepares to shoot the apple off Jemmy's head

Scene 1: A ruined/deserted chapel in the Altdorf palace grounds

Arnold has come to tell Mathilde that, instead of leaving for battle, he is staying to avenge his father, and thereby renouncing both glory and Mathilde. When he tells her that it was Gesler who had his father executed, she denounces his crime, and recognises the impossibility of their love (Pour notre amour, plus d'espérance – "All hope for our love has gone"). Hearing preparations for the coming festival in the palace grounds, they bid a fond farewell to each other (Sur la rive étrangère – "Though upon a foreign shore").

Scene 2: The main square at Altdorf

The day is the hundredth anniversary of Austrian rule in Switzerland. Soldiers sing of the glories of Gesler and the Emperor. In commemoration, Gesler has had his hat placed on top of a pole and the Swiss are ordered and then forced to pay homage to the hat. Gesler commands that there should be dancing and singing to mark the century during which the empire has "deigned to sustain [Swiss] weakness", and a variety of dances and choruses follow. Soldiers have noticed Tell and his son in the crowd, refusing to pay homage to the hat, and drag him forward. Rodolphe recognises him as the man who assisted in Leuthold's escape, and Gesler orders his arrest. In a complex choir and quartet, the soldiers express their hesitation at arresting this famed archer (C'est là cet archer redoutable – "It's that redoubtable archer"), Gesler forces them to act, and Tell urges Jemmy to flee, but he prefers to stay with his father.

Gesler notices the affection Tell has for his son, and has Jemmy seized. Inspired, he devises his test: Tell must shoot an arrow through an apple balanced on Jemmy's head – should he refuse, both of them will die. The assembled Swiss are horrified at this cruelty, but Jemmy urges his father to courage, and refuses to be tied up for the challenge. Resigned, Tell retrieves his bow from the soldiers, but takes two arrows from his quiver and hides one of them. He sings an anguished aria to Jemmy, instructing him (Sois immobile – "Stay completely still"), and the two separate. Finally, Tell draws his bow, shoots, and drives the arrow through the apple and into the stake. The people acclaim his victory, and Gesler is enraged. Noticing the second arrow, he demands to know what Tell intended for it. Tell confesses his desire to kill Gesler with the second arrow, and both he and Jemmy are seized for execution.

Mathilde enters and claims Jemmy in the name of the emperor, refusing to let a child die (Vous ne l'obtiendrez pas – "You will not have him"). Gesler announces his intention to take Tell across Lake Lucerne to the fort at Kusnac/Küssnacht, and there to throw him to the reptiles in the lake. Rodolphe expresses concern at attempting a journey on the lake in the storm, but Gesler intends to force Tell, an expert boatman, to pilot the vessel. They leave, amid conflicting cries of "Anathema on Gesler" from the people, and "Long live Gesler" from the soldiers.

=== Act 4 ===
Scene 1: Old Melchthal's house

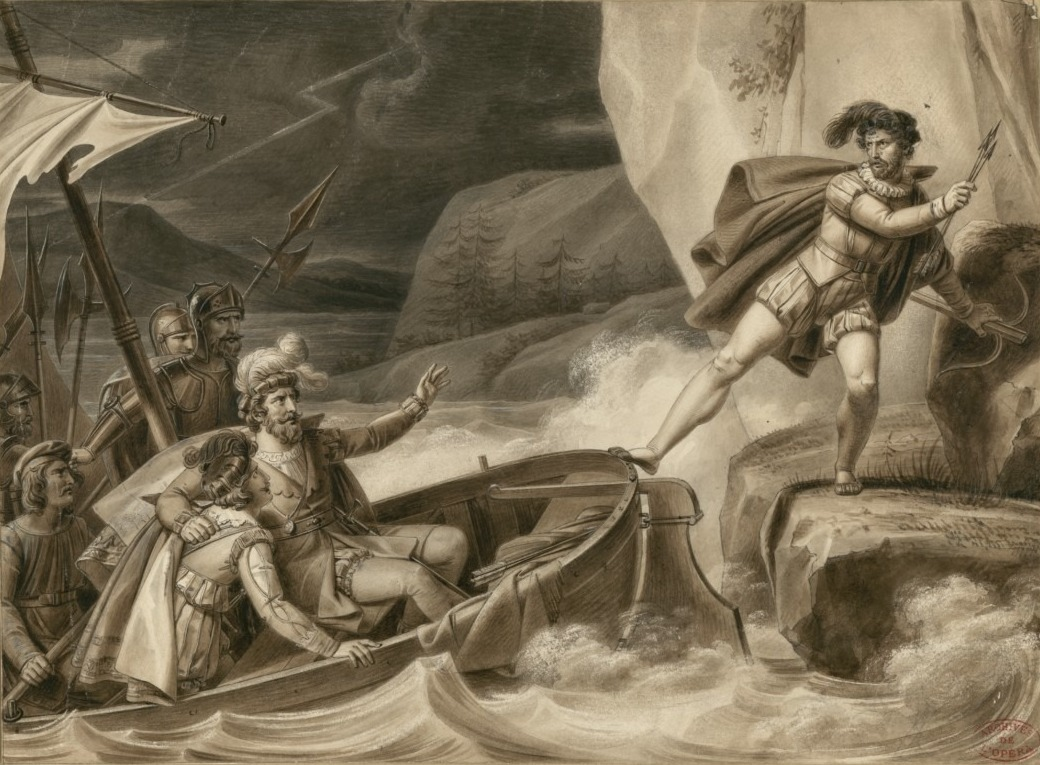
Tell pushes the boat back

Arnold, aware of Tell's arrest, is dispirited, but, set on revenge, draws strength from being in his father's former home and sings a moving lament (Ne m'abandonne point, espoir de la vengeance... Asile héréditaire... – "Do not abandon me, hope of vengeance... Home of my forefathers"). Would-be "confederates" arrive, sharing and reinforcing his hope of vengeance. Revived, Arnold points them to the weapons cache that his father and Tell had prepared. Seeing the men armed, Arnold launches into a hugely demanding aria (Amis, amis, secondez ma vengeance – "Friends, friends, assist my vengeance"), replete with multiple and sustained top Cs. Resolved, they leave to storm Altdorf and free Tell.

Scene 2: The rocky shore of Lake Lucerne

Hedwige is wandering by the lake, distraught. She tells the other women she intends to beg Gesler for Tell's life. In the distance, she hears Jemmy calling. Her son enters, along with Mathilde, whom Hedwige entreats for assistance. In some versions, Mathilde, Jemmy and Hedwige sing a moving trio (Je rends a votre amour un fils digne de vous – "I return to your love a son worthy of you"). Jemmy tells his mother that Tell is no longer in Altdorf, but on the lake, at which point Hedwige begins precipitously to mourn (Sauve Guillaume! Il meurt victime de son amour pour son pays – "Save William! He dies a victim of his love for his country"). Leuthold arrives, telling the assembled villagers that the boat carrying Tell, Gesler and the soldiers is being driven towards the rocks by a storm that has broken over the lake – Leuthold believes that the chains have been removed from Tell's hands, so that he might pilot the boat to safety.

The boat pulls into view, and Tell jumps ashore before pushing the boat back. He is amazed to see his house burning in the distance. Jemmy tells him that, for want of a beacon, he set fire to their home but, before doing so, he retrieved his father's bow and arrows. Gesler and the soldiers come into view, intent on recapturing Tell, who kills Gesler with a single shot and the cry, "Let Switzerland breathe!" Walter and a group of confederates arrive, having seen the burning house. Tell informs them of Gesler's death, but cautions that Altdorf still stands. Arnold and his band enter, and break the happy news: they have taken Altdorf. Arnold sees Mathilde, who declares herself "disabused of false grandeur" and ready to join the fight for liberty at his side.

The clouds break, and the sun shines on a pastoral scene of wild beauty. The gathered Swiss fighters and women sing a paean to the magnificence of nature and the return of freedom in a lyrical C major aria (Tout change et grandit en ces lieux... Liberté, redescends des cieux – "Everything is changing and growing grander in this place... Liberty, descend again from heaven") as the ranz des vaches motif returns once again and finally.

== Noted excerpts ==
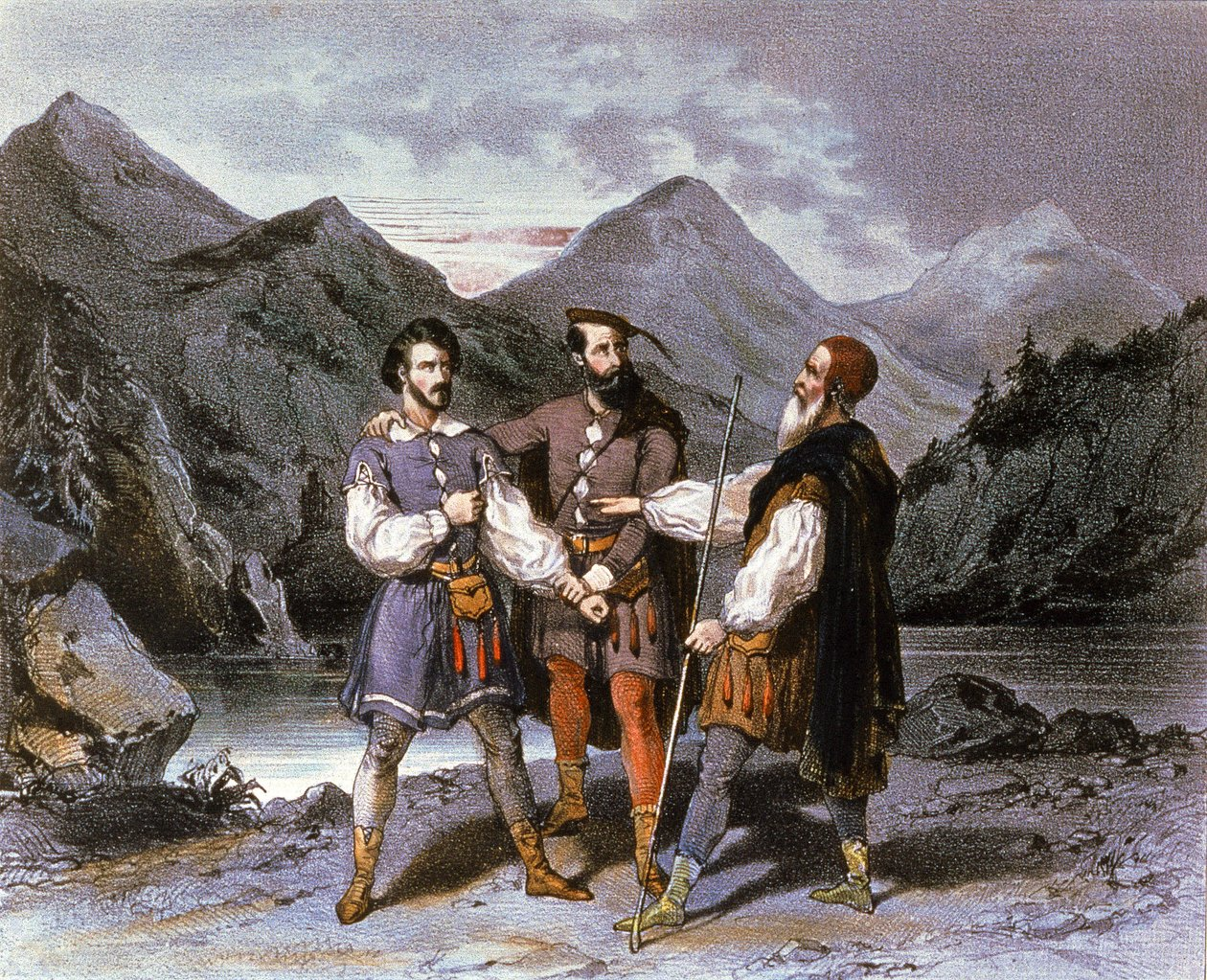
The oath of three cantons

- Overture
- "Ah, Mathilde, je t'aime et je t'adore" (Arnold, act 1)
- "Sombre forêt" (Mathilde, act 2)
- "Oui, vous l'arrachez à mon âme" (Mathilde, Arnold, act 2)
- "Quand l'Helvétie est un champs de supplice... Ses jours qu'ils ont osé proscire... Embrasons-nous d'un saint délire" (Tell, Arnold, Walter, act 2)
- "Pour notre amour... Sur la rive étrangère" (Mathilde, act 3)
- "Sois immobile" (Tell, act 3)
- "Asile héréditaire... Amis, amis, secondez ma vengeance" (Arnold, act 4)

During the Crimean War John MacLeod transcribed "La tua danza sì leggiera", a chorus part in the third act, to create the tune "The Green Hills of Tyrol", a well-known retreat march in the Scottish bagpipe tradition. The musician Andy Stewart added lyrics and the song in 1961 became a hit under the name "A Scottish Soldier".

== In popular culture ==
Characters and scenes from the opera William Tell are recognisable on the court cards and aces of William Tell cards, playing cards that were designed in Hungary around 1835. These cards spread across the Austro-Hungarian Empire and are still the most common German-suited playing cards in that part of the world today. Characters portrayed on the Obers and Unters include: Hermann Gessler, Walter Fürst, Rudolf Harras and William Tell.
