= Imprimatura =

Color stain painted on a white ground

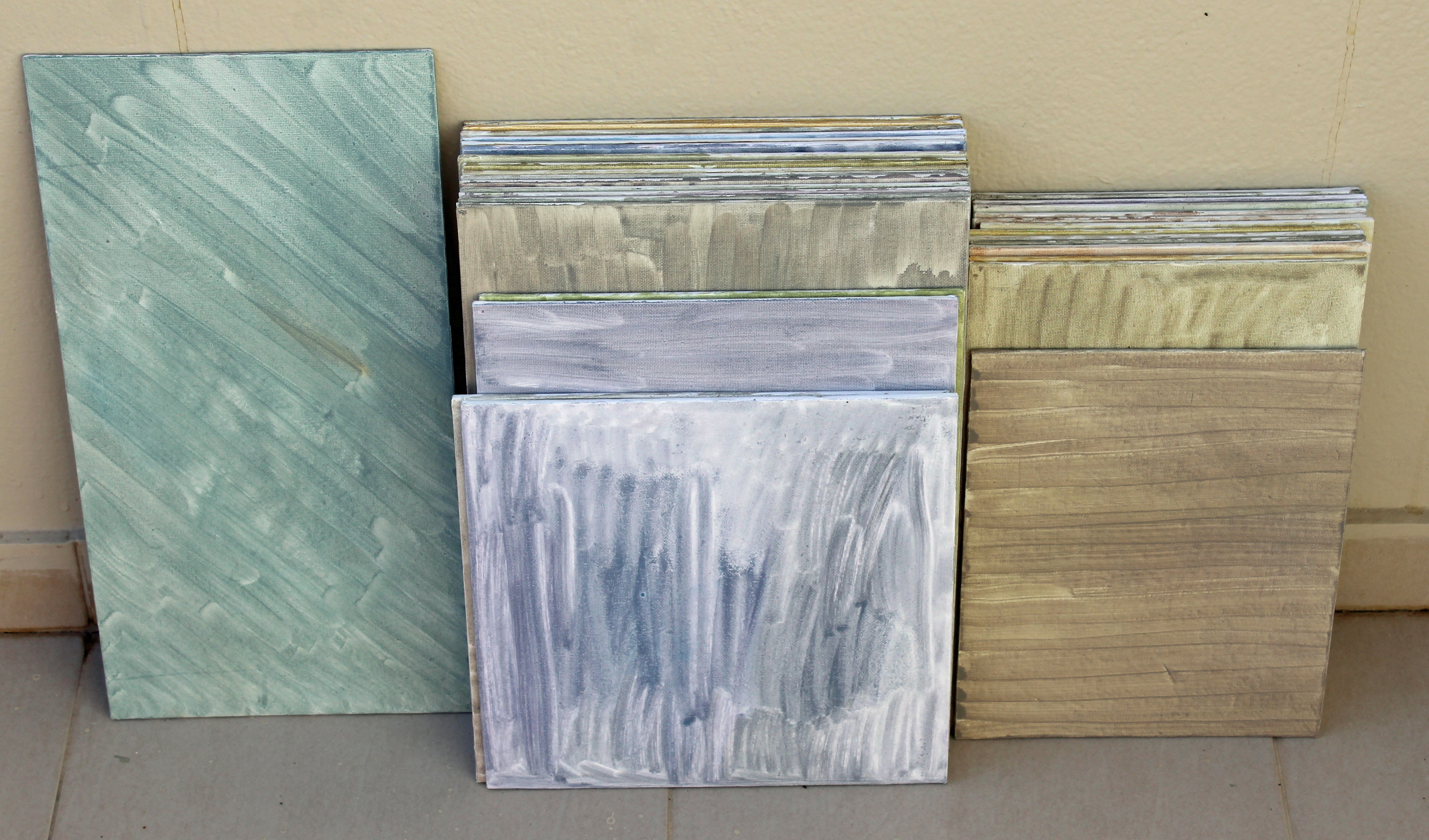
Imprimatura for plein air studies

In painting, imprimatura is an initial stain of color painted on a ground. It provides a painter with a transparent, toned ground, which will allow light falling onto the painting to reflect through the paint layers. The term comes from Italian and literally means 'first paint layer'. Its use as an underpainting layer can be dated back to the guilds and workshops during the Middle Ages; however, it came into standard use by painters during the Renaissance, particularly in Italy.

The imprimatura not only provides an overall tonal optical unity in a painting but is also useful in the initial stages of the work because it helps the painter establish value relations from dark to light. It is most useful in the classical approach of indirect painting, in which the drawing and underpainting are established ahead of time and allowed to dry. The successive layers of color are then applied in transparent glaze or semi-transparent layers.

Care is taken not to cover the imprimatura completely, allowing it to show through the final paint layers; this is effective in particular in the middle to dark shadow areas of the work.

An imprimatura is usually made with an earth pigment such as raw sienna, and it is often diluted with turpentine.

The term imprimatura should not be confused with imprimatur, a term used in editing.

== See also ==
- Underdrawing
- Underpainting
