= Jacques Marquet de Montbreton de Norvins =

French Politician

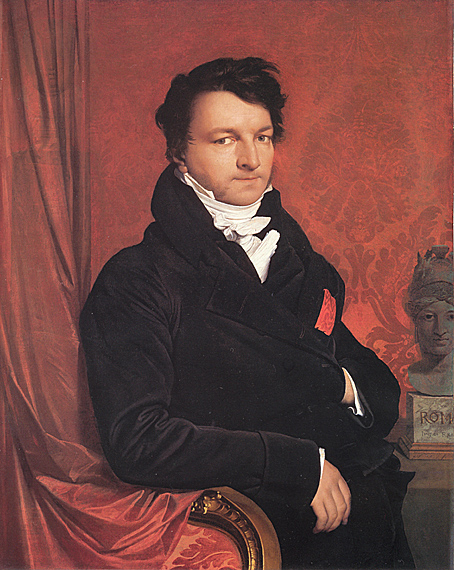
Jacques Marquet de Montbreton de Norvins

Jacques Marquet de Montbreton, baron de Norvins (Paris, 18 June 1769 - Paris, 30 July 1854) was a French politician and writer, also a soldier, lawyer and administrator. Born into a wealthy family of tax farmers, after Napoleon came to power, Norvins became and remained a firm supporter, serving as Napoleon's Chief of Police in French-occupied Rome from 1810 to 1814.

== Ingres portrait ==
A portrait of Jacques de Norvins in the National Gallery, London was painted by Ingres in 1811–12, when the sitter was Napoleon's Chief of Police in Rome. Originally, instead of the curtain at the left, there was a fully painted bust of a boy's head on top of a small column. Probably this was a bust of Napoleon's son, who was known as the King of Rome. The presumption is that this was overpainted with the curtain after the fall of Napoleon, either by Ingres himself, or another artist. The bust can just be made out in the enlarged online photo, with its chin level with the sitter's hair-line; the top of the column was level with the middle of the sitter's ear. These may always have been (just) visible, or have become so by the paint becoming transparent with age. Few viewers of the painting would notice the bust without it being pointed out. Strictly speaking, these alterations might not be described as pentimenti, because of the presumed lapse of time, and because another artist may have made the change.

== Works ==
- Les Ruines et les monuments, poème dithyrambique, 1806
- Sur la guerre actuelle et ses résultats, 31 May 1815
- De l'intérêt de l'époque actuelle, 1819
- Tableau de la Révolution française, depuis son origine jusqu'en 1814, 1819
- L'Immortalité de l'âme, ou les Quatre âges religieux, poème en 4 chants, 1822
- Portefeuille de 1813, ou Tableau politique et militaire renfermant, avec le récit des événements de cette époque, un choix de la correspondance inédite de l'empereur Napoléon et de celle de plusieurs personnages distingués, soit français, soit étrangers, pendant la première campagne de Saxe, l'armistice de Plesswitz, le congrès de Prague et la seconde campagne de Saxe, 1825
- Histoire de Napoléon, 1827

He was also (with Arnault, Jay and Jouy) one of the authors of the Biographie des Contemporains.

== Sources ==
- Bouillet, Marie-Nicolas; Chassang, Alexis, eds. (1878). Dictionnaire Bouillet (in French).
- Georges Hartmann, L'Hôtel, rue d'Anjou, où mourut La Fayette, Extrait du Bulletin de la Société historique et archéologique des VIII^{e} et XVII^{e} arrondissements, Paris, Librairie ancienne Édouard Champion, 1921, pp. 23–24
