= Underdrawing =

Fine-art technique

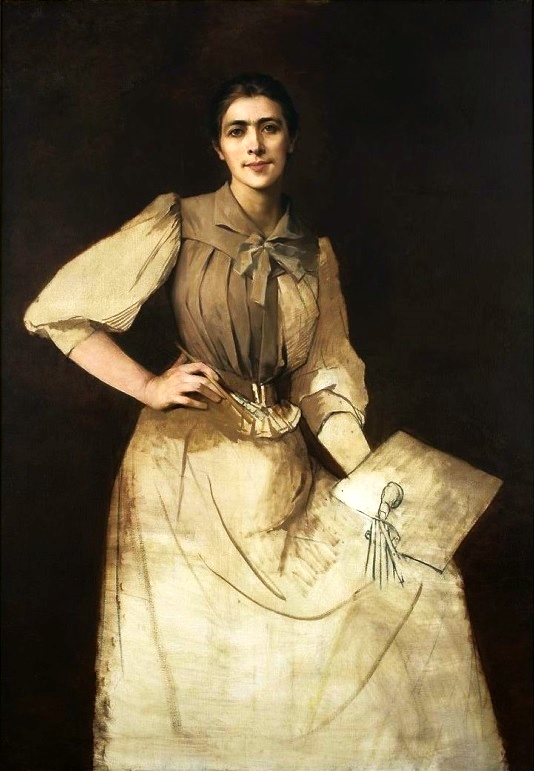
Anna Bilińska-Bohdanowicz, Self-portrait, 1892, National Museum in Warsaw. Unfinished portrait showing underdrawing.

Underdrawing is a preparatory drawing done on a painting ground before paint is applied, for example, an imprimatura or an underpainting. Underdrawing was used extensively by 15th-century painters like Jan van Eyck and Rogier van der Weyden. These artists "underdrew" with a brush, using hatching strokes for shading, using water-based black paint, before underpainting and overpainting with oils. Cennino D'Andrea Cennini (14th century most likely) describes a different type of underdrawing, made with graded tones rather than hatching, for egg tempera.

In some cases, underdrawing can be clearly visualized using infrared reflectography because carbon black pigments absorb infrared light, whereas opaque pigments such as lead white are transparent with infrared light. Underdrawing in many works, for example, the Annunciation (van Eyck, Washington) or the Arnolfini Portrait, reveals that artists made pentimenti or alterations, sometimes radical ones, to their compositions.

The underdrawing can reveal changes, sometimes radical, made by the painter as the painting develops. For example, one of the five versions of the Madonna by Edvard Munch has underdrawings showing the arms conventionally hanging down, before the final version has one arm behind the subject's head, and the other behind her back.
