= La Minerve (French newspaper) =

French newspaper

La Minerve, later La Minerve française, was a daily French newspaper first published on 1 April 1818. Liberal and in favour of the Charte constitutionnelle, it was suspected under the Bourbon Restoration of being the organ of Bonapartists and Republicans. Its main editors were Benjamin Constant, Louis-Antoine Garnier-Pagès, Louis-Antoine Garnier-Pagès, Victor-Joseph Étienne de Jouy, Étienne Aignan, and the singer Béranger, Évariste Dumoulin, Antoine Jay, Pierre Louis de Lacretelle, Pierre-François Tissot.

== Notes ==
=== References ===
Bibliography

- Harpaz, Ephraïm (1968). L'École libérale sous la Restauration, le Mercure et la Minerve: 1817-1820. Paris: Droz.
- Faul, Michel (2009). Les aventures militaires, littéraires et autres d'Etienne de Jouy. Seguier. ISBN 978-2-84049-556-7.
