= Antoine Jay =

French writer, journalist, historian and politician (1770–1854)

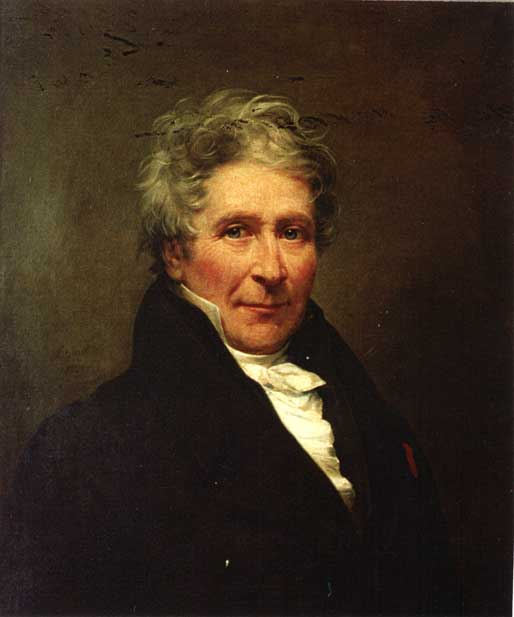
Antoine Jay

Antoine Jay (20 October 1770, Guîtres – 9 April 1854, Courgeac) was a French writer, journalist, historian and politician.

== Biography ==
At first an Oratorian at Niort, he studied law at Toulouse then became a lawyer, then briefly worked as the administrator of the district of Libourne. He travelled to Canada and the United States between 1795 and 1802 to escape the French Revolution, making friends with Thomas Jefferson and teaching French to Lemuel Shaw.

From 1803 to 1809, he was tutor to the sons of Joseph Fouché, before serving as a civil servant in the Ministry of Police, where he translated English newspapers. He contributed to the Journal des Voyages and L'Abeille, participated in the foundation of Constitutionnel and La Minerve française, and edited the Journal de Paris. He was an influential opposition journalist, who had supported the French Revolution and First French Empire (serving as a deputy in the Chambre of the Hundred Days and favouring the handover of Napoleon to the Allies after Waterloo), opposing the Bourbon Restoration and finally seeing the triumph of his political ideal in the July Revolution. He was mayor of Lagorce (1830–1848), conseiller général for the Gironde (1831–1837) and deputy for the Gironde (1815, 1831, 1834).

He came to note for his Histoire du ministère du cardinal de Richelieu (1815) and his elogies of Corneille and Montaigne (published in his Tableau littéraire de la France pendant le XVIIIe siècle in 1818). He, Antoine-Vincent Arnault, Jacques de Norvins and Étienne de Jouy then collaborated on a Biographie nouvelle des contemporains, for which he notably edited an article on Jean-Baptiste Boyer-Fonfrède which led to his imprisonment for a month in the prison Sainte-Pélagie. However, he is best known for his Conversion d'un romantique (1830), in which he staunchly opposes romanticism, writing:

But I will abstain from critical remarks on [their] use of language : they would be too numerous; and indeed our young masters add to the number of rights acquired by romanticism that of distorting the language and making solecisms with impunity. They do not wish to imprison their genius within the rules of grammar : this would be too servile an imitation of fallen classicism.

His opposition to romanticism even went so far as voting against Victor Hugo's election to the Académie française in 1841 (Jay had been elected to the Académie himself in 1832 and was "one of [its] best sleepers" according to a contemporary).

== Works ==
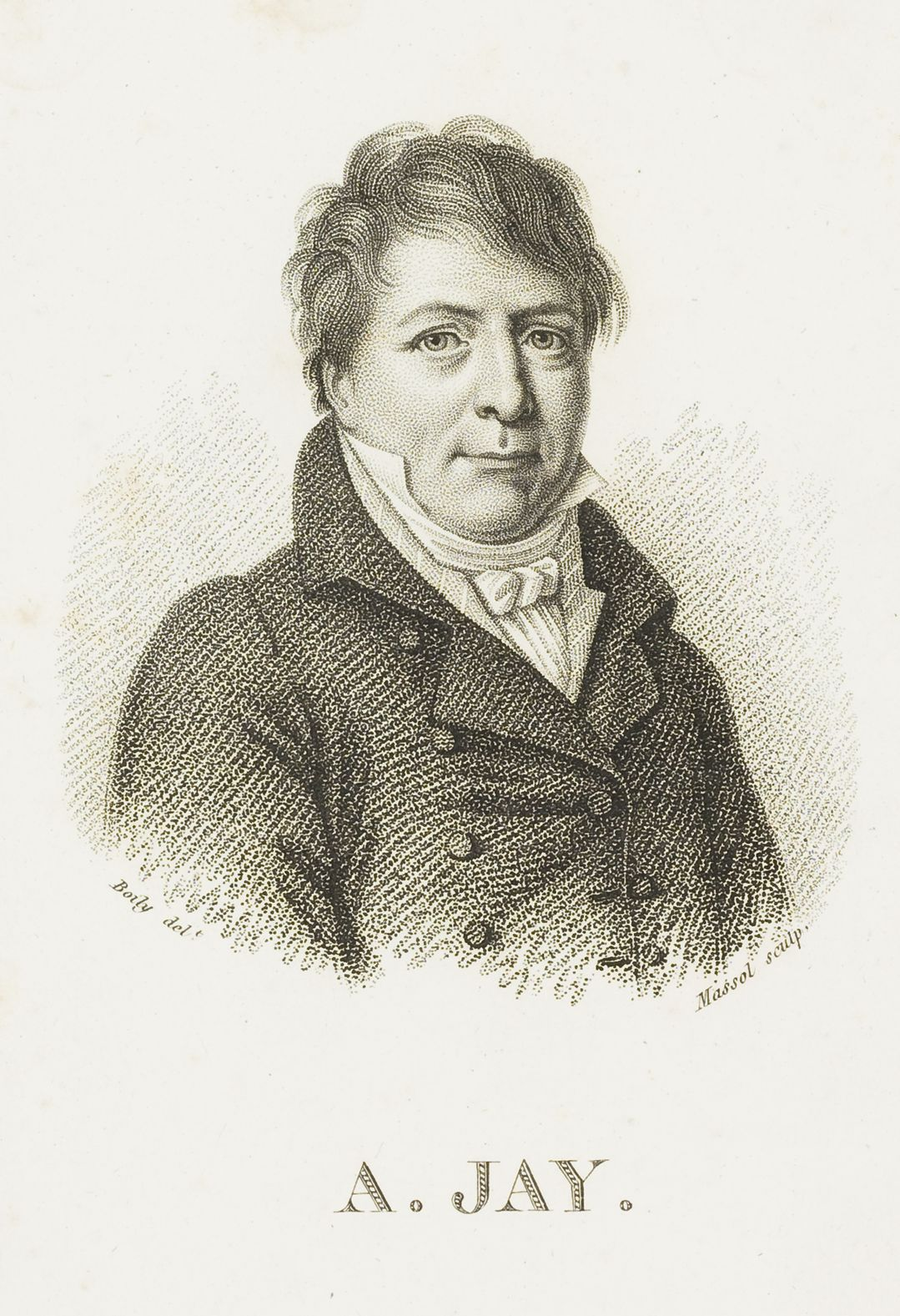
Engraving of Antoine Jay

- Le Glaneur, ou Essais de Nicolas Freeman (1812)
- Les États-Unis et l'Angleterre, ou Souvenirs et réflexions d'un citoyen américain [aka William Lee ], essais traduits sur le manuscrit de l'auteur (1814)
- Histoire du ministère du cardinal de Richelieu (2 volumes, 1815)
- Voyages dans la partie septentrionale du Brésil, depuis 1809 jusqu'en 1815, par Henri Koster, traduits de l'anglais (2 volumes, 1818)
- Recueil de pièces authentiques sur le captif de Sainte-Hélène, de mémoires et documents écrits ou dictés par l'empereur Napoleon; suivis de lettres de MM. le grand-maréchal comte Bertrand, le comte Las Cases, le général baron Gourgaud, le général comte Montholon, les docteurs Warden, O'Meara et Autommarchi [sic], et plusieurs personnages de haute distinction (12 volumes, 1821–25)
- Salon d'Horace Vernet, analyse historique et pittoresque des 45 tableaux exposés chez lui en 1822 (In collaboration with Étienne de Jouy, 1822)
- Les Hermites en prison, ou Consolations de Sainte-Pélagie (2 volumes in collaboration with Étienne de Jouy, 1823)
- Les Hermites en liberté, pour faire suite aux « Hermites en prison » (4 volumes in collaboration with Étienne de Jouy, 1824)
- La Conversion d'un romantique, manuscrit de Joseph Delorme, suivi de deux lettres sur la littérature du siècle et d'un essai sur l'éloquence politique en France (1830)
- Œuvres littéraires (4 volumes, 1831)
- La Piété filiale, ou Histoire de Pauline (1852)

Online texts

- Tableau littéraire de la France pendant le XVIIIe siècle; Éloge de Montaigne; Précis historique sur la vie et les ouvrages de l'abbé Raynal
- Considérations sur l'état politique de l'Europe, sur celui de la France, sur la censure et les élections, ou Supplément aux « Documents historiques » de M. Kératry
- Conversion d'un romantique; Essai sur l'éloquence politique en France
- Essais sur les mœurs; Mélanges de littérature
- Nouvelles américaines; Dialogue des morts; Mélanges de littérature
