= Pentimento =

Alteration in a painting evidenced by traces of previous work

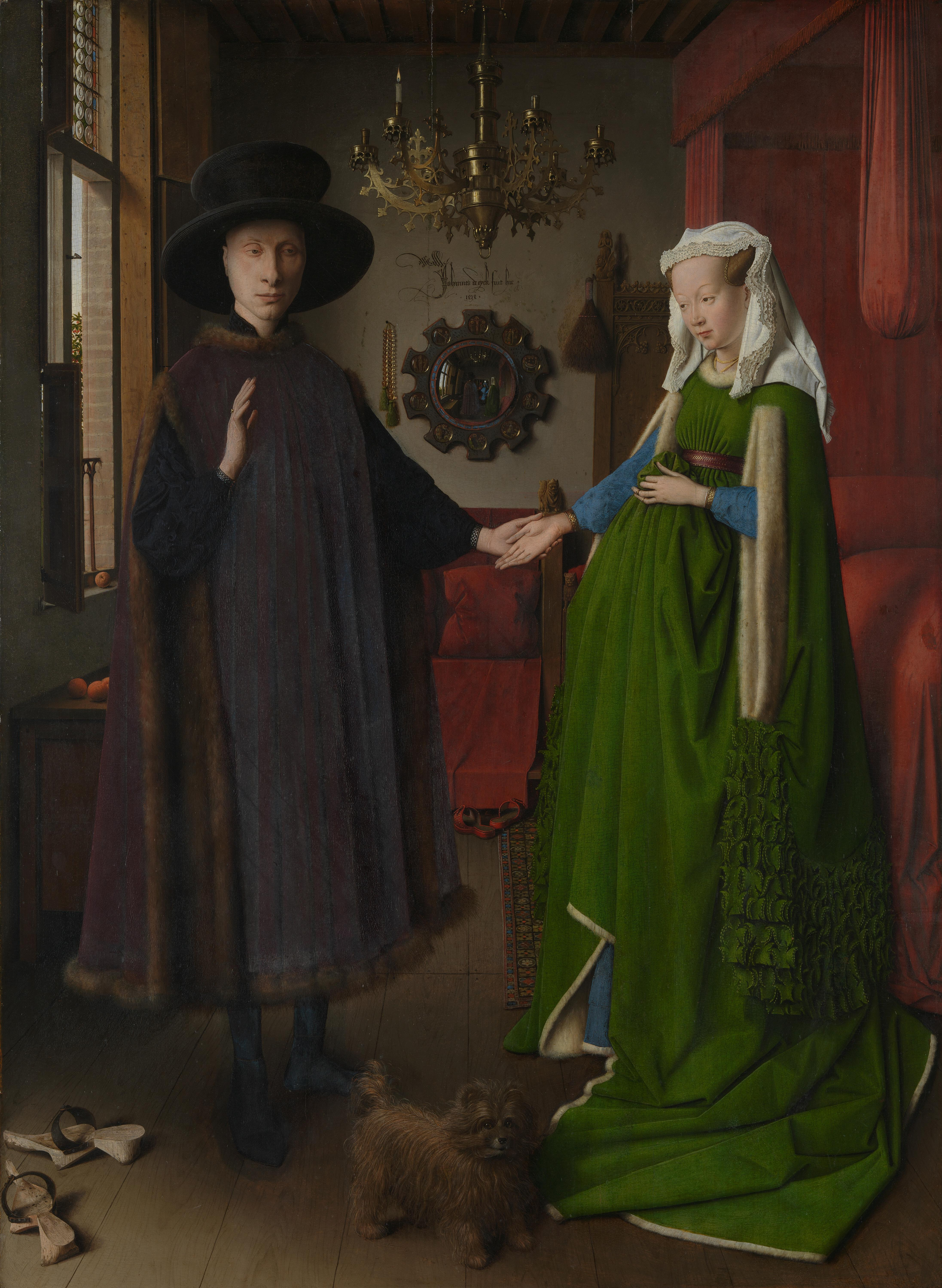
The Arnolfini Portrait by Jan van Eyck (1434). Among other changes made, the husband's face was higher by about the height of his eye, the wife's was higher, and her eyes looked more to the front. Each of the husband's feet was underdrawn in one position, painted in another, and then overpainted in a third. These alterations can be seen in infra-red reflectograms.

In painting, a pentimento (Italian for 'repentance'; from the verb pentirsi, meaning 'to repent'; plural pentimenti) is "the presence or emergence of earlier images, forms, or strokes that have been changed and painted over". Sometimes the English form "pentiment" is used, especially in older sources.

== Significance ==
Pentimenti may show that a composition originally had an element, for example, a head or a hand, in a slightly different place, or that an element no longer in the final painting was originally planned. The changes may have been done in the underdrawing of the painting, or by the visible layers of paint differing from the underdrawing, or by the first painted treatment of the element having been over-painted.

Some pentimenti have always been visible on the final painting with careful inspection; others are revealed by the increasing transparency that some paint acquires after several centuries. Others, especially in the underdrawing, can only be seen with modern methods such as X-rays and infrared reflectography and photographs. These are able to record photographically some pigments, depending on their chemical composition, which remain covered by later paint layers. For example, white lead, a common pigment, will be detected by X-ray, and carbon black underdrawings can often be seen with great clarity in infra-red reflectograms. These methods have greatly expanded the number of pentimenti art historians are aware of, and confirmed that they are very common in the works of many old masters, from Jan van Eyck onwards.

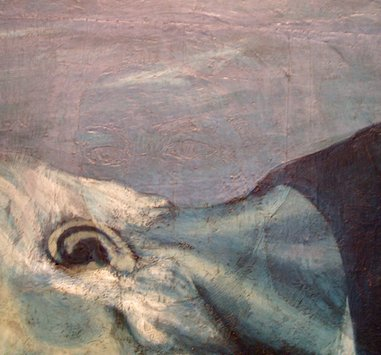
The face of the woman in the image The Old Guitarist is painted over. These marks would not usually be described as pentimenti as the subjects are totally different

Pentimenti are considered especially important when considering whether a particular painting is the first version by the original artist, or a second version by the artist himself, or his workshop, or a later copyist. Normally, secondary versions or copies will have few if any pentimenti, although this will not always be the case, as in The Lute Player by Caravaggio. Like Rembrandt, Titian and many other masters, Caravaggio seems rarely to have made preliminary drawings but to have composed straight onto the canvas. The number of pentimenti found in the work of such masters naturally tends to be higher.

Marks revealing a totally different subject, for example in The Old Guitarist by Picasso, are not usually described as pentimenti – the artist has abandoned his "earlier composition" to begin a new one. In cases where a composition has been changed by a later painter or restorer, marks showing the original composition would not be described as pentimenti either; it must be the original painter who has changed his mind.

Evidence of pentimenti may also help experts determine that the work was not created by a copier or forger since they are more likely to reproduce the original without making changes.

== Usage in English ==
The term is usually treated as an Italian word and therefore written in italics, depending on the style used in the individual context. The fully anglicised word pentiment (plural pentiments) is much rarer, though included in the Grove Dictionary of Art. The distinction between singular and plural is also rather flexible; some writers refer to a change of just one outline as pentimenti, whilst others treat each area that has been changed as a single pentimento. The word pentimento is occasionally used synonymously with palimpsest, but strictly the latter is used for documents and parchments which, due to obsolescence, have been reused.

== Examples ==
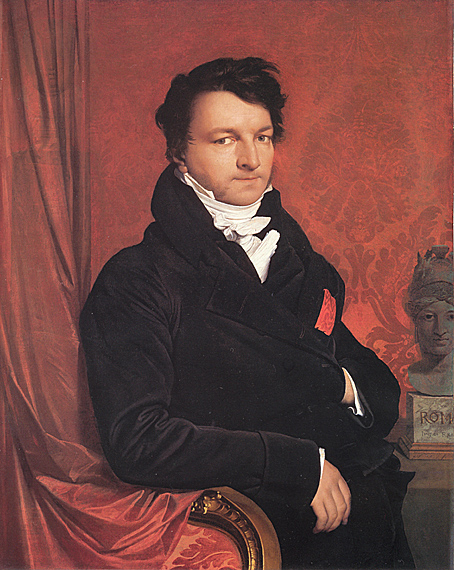
Jacques de Norvins by Ingres

A portrait of Jacques de Norvins was painted by Ingres in 1811–12, when the sitter was Napoleon's Chief of Police in Rome. Originally, instead of the curtain at the left, there was a fully painted bust of a boy's head on top of a small column. Probably this was a bust of Napoleon II, Napoleon's son, who was known as the King of Rome. The presumption is that this was overpainted with the curtain after the fall of Napoleon, either by Ingres himself, or another artist. The bust can just be made out in the enlarged online photo, with its chin level with the sitter's hair-line; the top of the column was level with the middle of the sitter's ear. These may always have been (just) visible, or have become so by the paint becoming transparent with age. Few viewers of the painting would notice the bust without it being pointed out. Strictly speaking, these alterations might not be described as pentimenti, because of the presumed lapse of time, and because another artist may have made the change.

Several examples by Leonardo da Vinci can be found in his Salvator Mundi, which was sold to a private collector for more than $450 million at Christie's. In particular the pose of Christ's right thumb was altered.

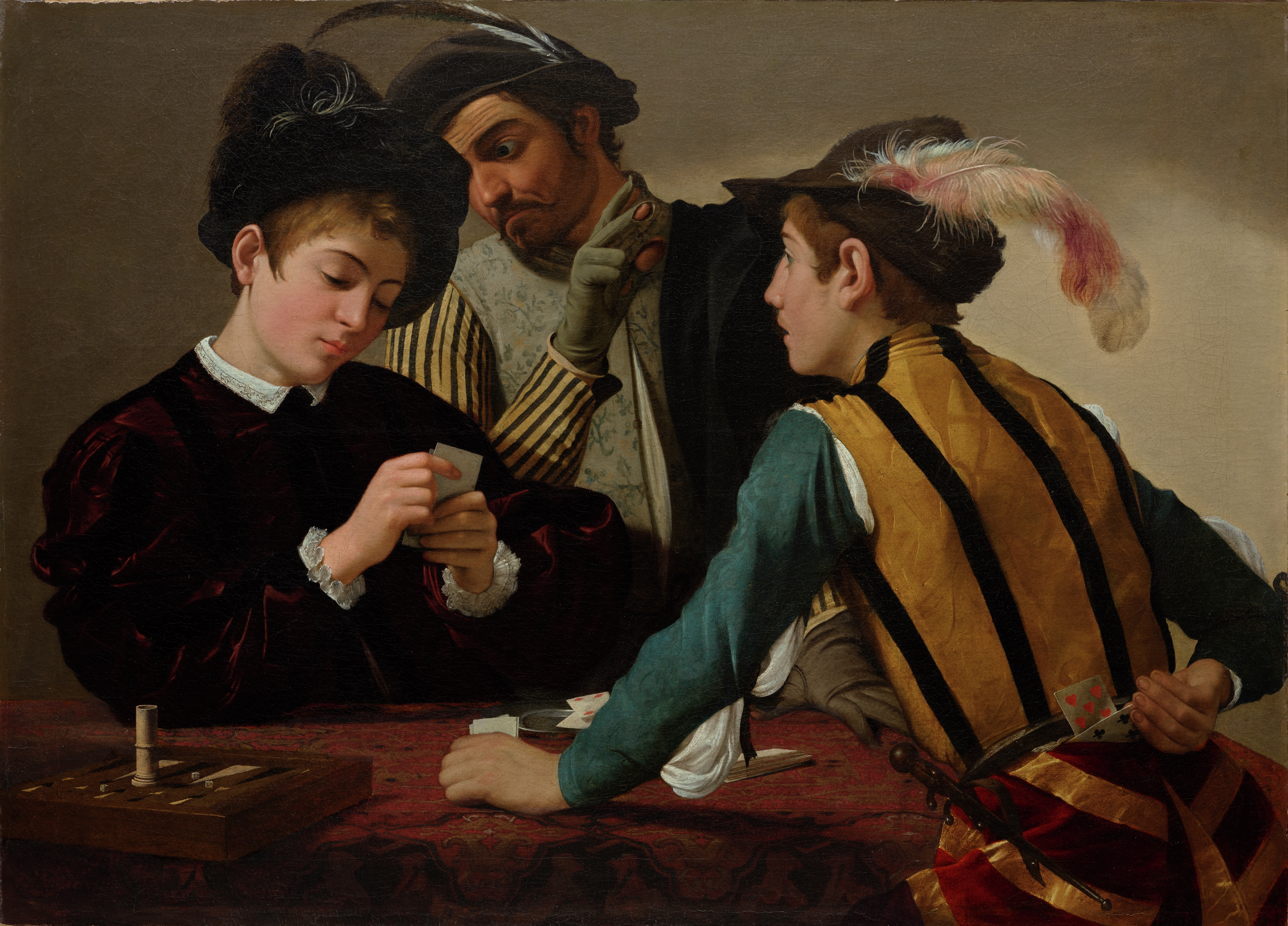
Caravaggio's The Cardsharps

A work by Caravaggio, The Cardsharps, has a number of typical minor pentimenti, altering the position of the figure on the right, which are revealed by infra-red reflectograms. These are used in discussing the painting and comparing it to another version of the subject in Bari.

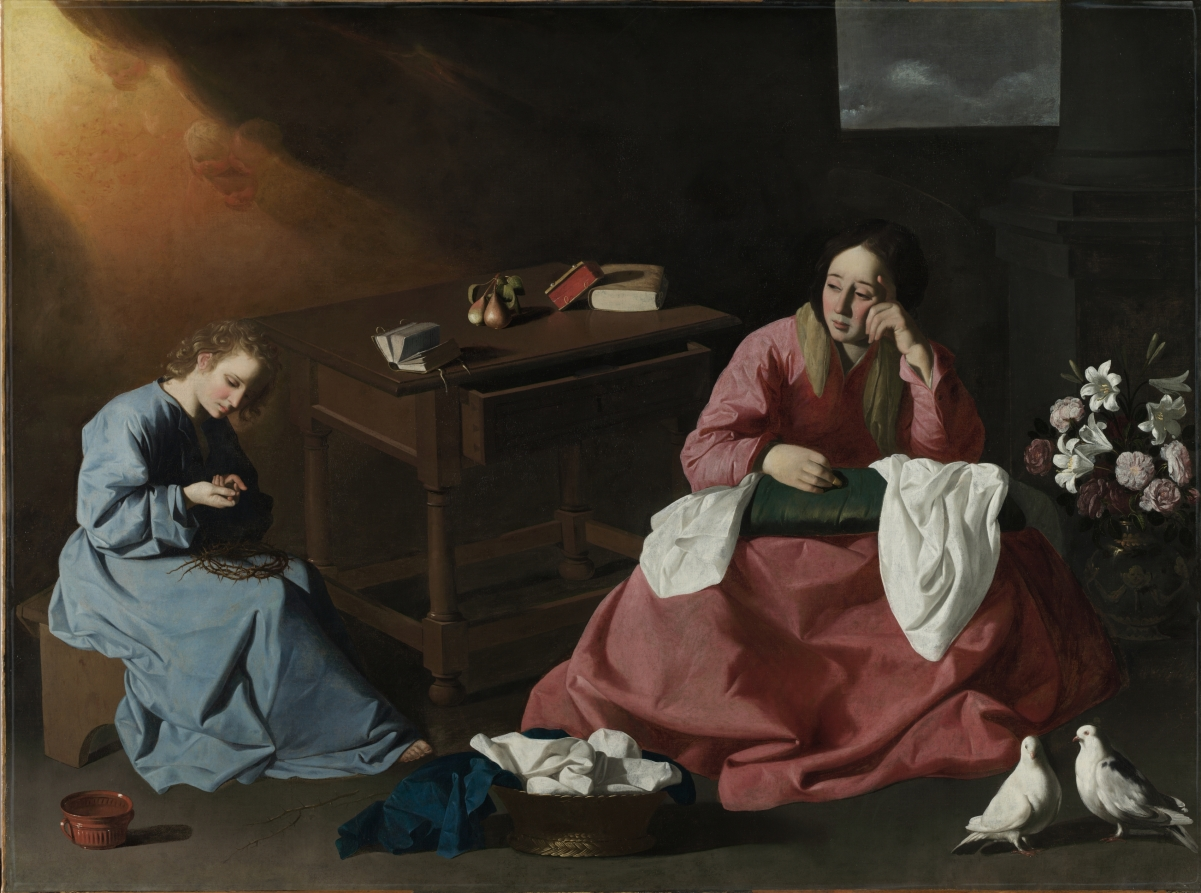
Christ and the Virgin in the House at Nazareth by Zurbarán

Zurbarán's Christ and the Virgin in the House at Nazareth shows that the size of a white cloth was expanded after the dark background underpainting had been applied; the expanded area is a darker white.

An example by Rembrandt can be found in his 1654 portrait Flora. The painting depicts the Roman goddess of spring, thought to be modelled on his deceased wife Saskia, and has elements of pentimento, in a double hat brim where the artist overpainted.

In 2016, as a result of the discovery of pentimenti after conservation and cleaning, the Courtauld Institute changed its opinion on its version of Manet’s Le déjeuner sur l'herbe from that of it being a copy to it being a preparatory painting that predates the version in the Louvre. Pentimenti were visible once the old varnish was removed, including alterations to the curve of the back of the female nude and the cap of one of the male figures, suggesting that the Courtauld picture is a preparatory work.

== Other uses ==
The term has sometimes been used in a modern sense to describe the appearance of the sides of buildings with painted advertising. Often old ads are painted over with newer ads and the paint wears away to reveal the older layers. Examples in Amsterdam, New York City and elsewhere have been photographed.

== See also ==
- Palimpsest

== Sources ==
- Campbell, Lorne (1998). The fifteenth-century netherlandish schools. National gallery catalogues. London: National gallery distrib. by Yale university press. ISBN 978-1-85709-171-7.
