= Carlo Denina =

Italian historian (1731–1813)

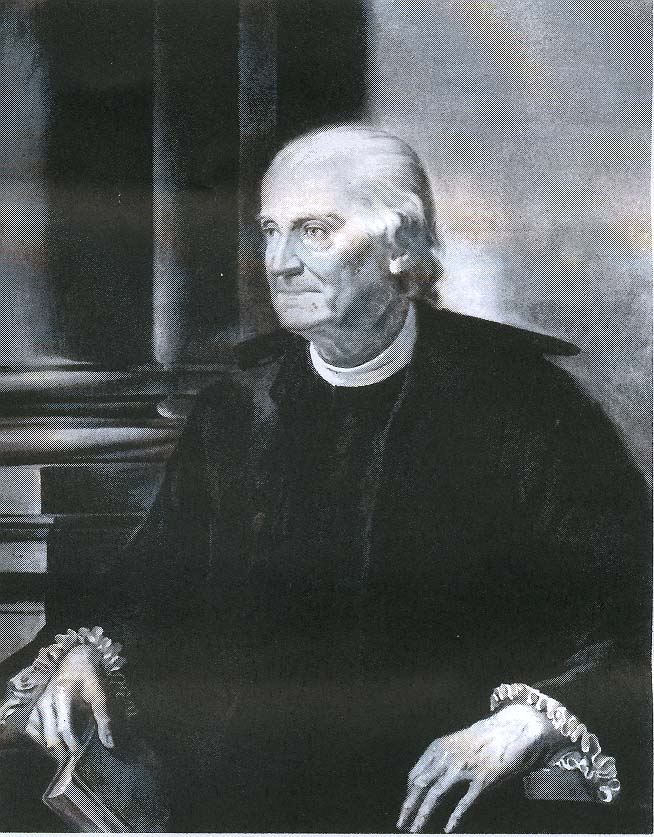
- Born: 1731; Revello, Piedmont
- Died: 5 December 1813 (aged 81–82); Paris, France

Academic work
- Notable works: Vie et régne de Frédéric II

Carlo Giovanni Maria Denina (1731, Revello – 5 December 1813, Paris) was an Italian historian whose unique contribution was to write a history of Italy from a "national" perspective, which significantly differed from other historians who mainly wrote from a "city state" or "localized" perspective during that time.

== Biography ==
Carlo Denina was born at Revello, Piedmont, in 1731, and was educated at Saluzzo and Turin. In 1753 he was appointed to the chair of humanity at Pinerolo, but he was soon compelled by the influence of the Jesuits to retire from it. In 1756 he graduated as doctor in theology, and began authorship with a theological treatise.

Promoted to the professorship of humanity and rhetoric in the college of Turin, he published (1769–1770) his Delle rivoluzioni d'Italia, the work on which his reputation is mainly founded. Collegiate honors accompanied the issue of its successive volumes, which, however, at the same time multiplied his foes and stimulated their hatred.

In 1782, at Frederick the Great's invitation, he went to Berlin, where he remained for many years, in the course of which he published his Vie et régne de Frédéric II (Berlin, 1788) and La Prusse littéraire sous Frédéric II (3 vols., Berlin, 1790–1791). His Réponse à la question: Que doit-on à l'Espagne? (1786) defends Spain and its culture. His Delle rivoluzioni della Germania was published at Florence in 1804, in which year he went to Paris as the imperial librarian, on the invitation of Napoleon. At Paris he published in 1805 his Tableau de la Haute Italie, et des Alpes qui l'entourent. He died there in 1813.

The French politician and poet Joseph Aurèle de Bossi studied law under his direction.

== Works ==
Carlo Denina left a great many works, most of them in Italian, including:

- 1760: Discours sur les vicissitudes de la littérature;
- 1770: Révolutions d'Italie, 1769 et 1820 (translated by abbé Jardin from 1770);
- 1781: Histoire politique et littéraire de la Grèce;
- 1788: Essai sur la vie de Frédéric II, in French;
- 1790: la Prusse littéraire sous Frédéric II;
- 1804: Révolutions de la Germanie;
- 1805: Histoire du Piémont;
- 1805: la Clef des langues (in French);
- 1809: Histoire de l'Italie occidentale.
