= Underpainting =

Often monochromatic initial layer of paint applied to a ground

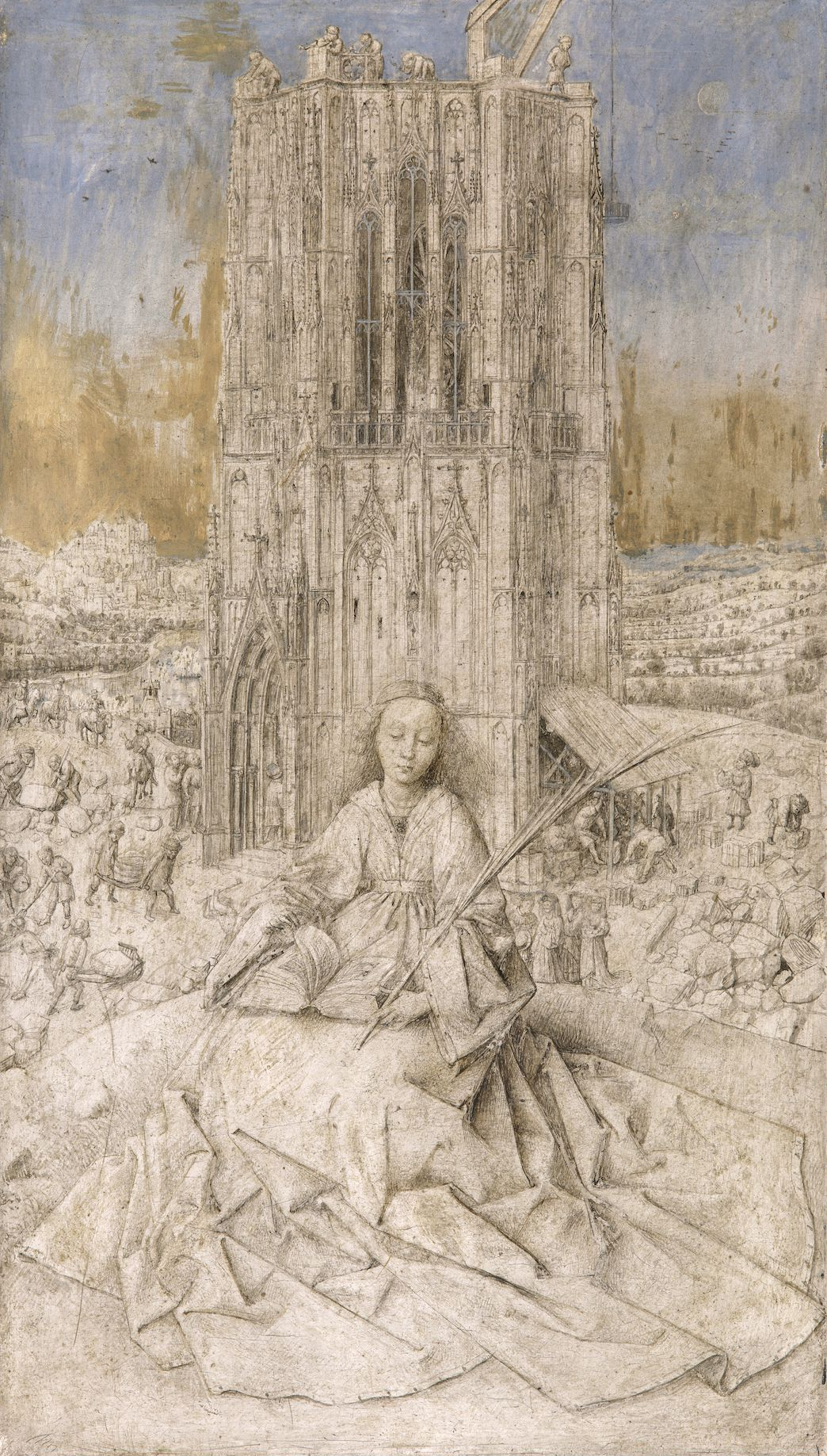
Jan van Eyck, Saint Barbara of Nicodemy, oil on panel, dead paint or underpainting that was not further finished apart from the aerial party.

In art, an underpainting is an initial layer of paint applied to a ground, which serves as a base for subsequent layers of paint. Underpaintings are often monochromatic and help to define color values for later painting. Underpainting gets its name because it is painting that is intended to be painted over (see overpainting) in a system of working in layers.

There are several different types of underpainting, such as veneda, verdaccio, morellone, imprimatura and grisaille. The different types have different colourings. Grisaille is plain grey. Verdaccio is a grey tending towards yellow or green that brings out more luminous tones, while imprimatura uses earth tones.

Underpainting has several advantages over working from a plain canvas. The neutral colours of the underpaint will not distract if they are not completely covered. It also aids the painter in getting a correct tone. Comparing colours to a white background is very different from the colouring of the final painting. A multi-color underpainting can also add to a work and was used by artists such as Giotto (whose technique is described in detail by Cennino Cennini), as well as by Jan van Eyck and Rogier van der Weyden (whose technique has been studied with modern scientific analysis). This technique was pioneered by Titian in the High Renaissance. The colors of the underpainting can be optically mingled with the subsequent overpainting, without the danger of the colors physically blending and becoming muddy. If underpainting is done properly, it facilitates overpainting. If it seems that one has to fight to obscure the underpainting, it is a sign that it was not done properly.

== See also ==
- Underdrawing
- List of art techniques
