= Overpainting =

Painting technique

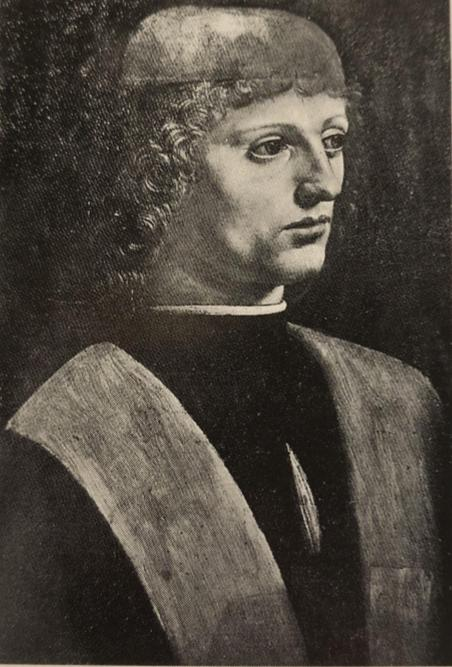
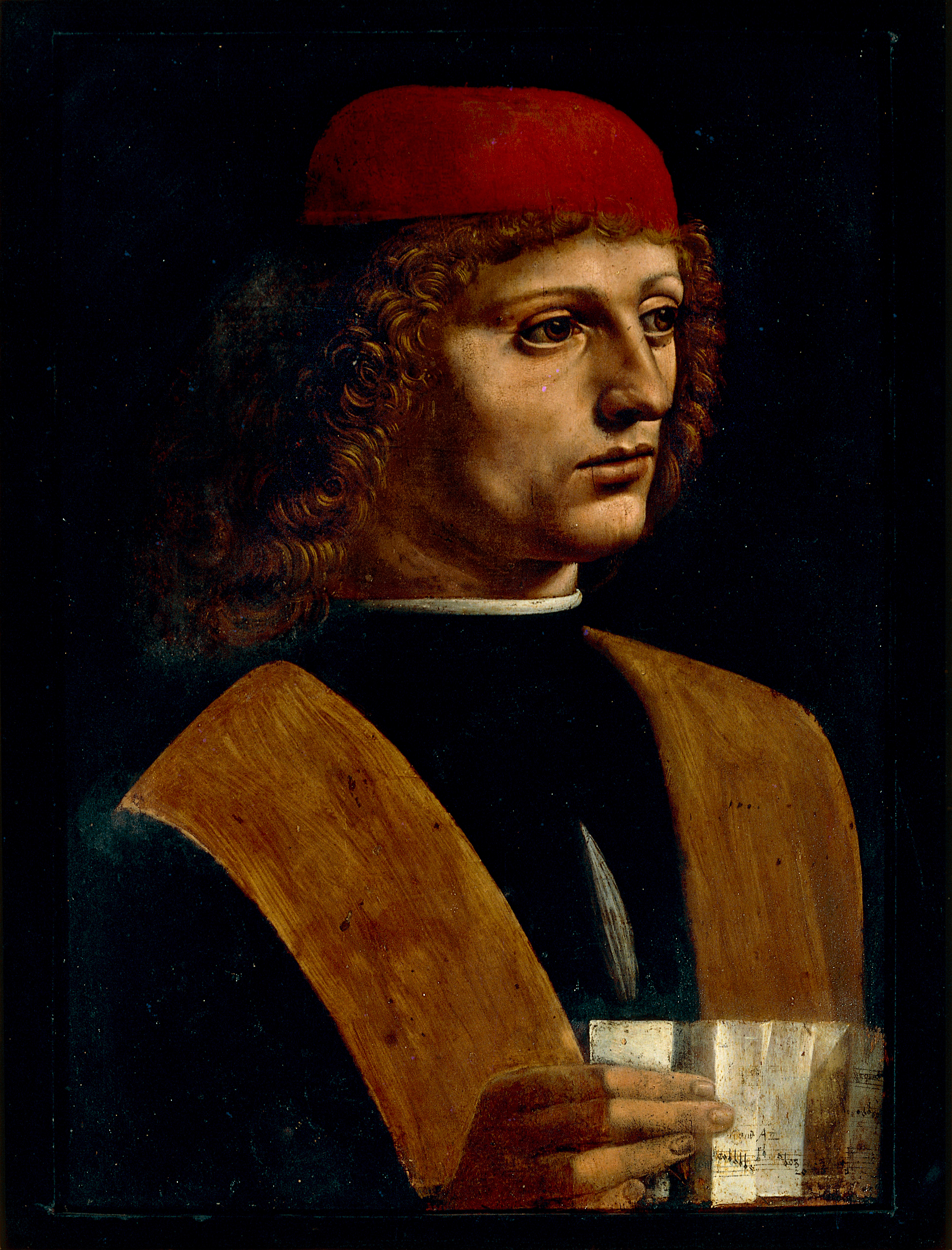
(Left) The Portrait of a Musician by Leonardo da Vinci before 1904; (right) the Portrait of a Musician after a 1904–1905 restoration, which removed overpaint and revealed a hand holding sheet music

Overpainting is the final layers of paint on a painted work of art, over some type of underpainting, in a system of working in layers. It can also refer to later paint added by restorers, or an artist or dealer wishing to "improve" or update an old image—a very common practice in the past. The underpainting gives a context in which the paint-strokes of the overpainting become more resonant and powerful. When properly done, overpainting does not need to completely obscure the underpainting. It is precisely the interaction of the two that gives the most interesting effects.

Overpainting was used extensively in many schools of art. Some of the most spectacular results can be seen in the work of Jan van Eyck.

It can be difficult to distinguish overpainting from underpainting in finished historical artworks in the absence of scientific tests. X-rays are often used to examine paintings because they allow the conservation technician to see what is hidden beneath a surface without having to damage it, depending on the materials used. By using different intensities of X-rays, experts can see different layers of paint and determine whether a canvas was ever painted over.

== Restoration ==
Overpainting as a restoration practice differs from inpainting, which focuses on restoring only the specific areas of a work which need to be touched up. Historically, overpainting was the primary method of restoring paintings, with artists often being tasked to conduct the restoration work as opposed to trained restoration specialists. Historical cleaning methods were known to damage paint, which often required overpainting to restore, which has led to the development of gentler and more targeted means of restoration. Overpainting has also been used as a form of censorship, or to cover parts of paintings which were interpreted by some as profane: one example is Michelangelo's The Last Judgement, which was revised several times after the artist's death, eventually resulting in 40 figures being covered with drapery, (Note: "Drapery" in this case refers to pieces of cloth used to censor nudity.) and two being repainted entirely.

Modern conservation practice generally prefers inpainting to overpainting as it is viewed as being less destructive. Overpainting can be removed, and the decision as to how and whether it should be removed has been aided by advances in technology, although there are ethical considerations involved as to whether to remove overpainting. With The Last Judgement, several figures had overpainted drapery removed in the 1990s, but many other changes were left untouched. There exists the risk that removal of overpainting can result in a complete loss of part of a painting, which then requires the affected area to be filled in again, and doing so without an understanding of the prior state of the work runs the risk of it being seen as forgery or vandalism. A popular example of a destructive overpainted restoration is Ecce Homo, a fresco which Cecilia Giménez attempted to restore, noting that the restoration had been unfinished when it was discovered. The loss of detail in this attempt resulted in the fresco quickly gaining Internet fame. Another example is the restoration of Gonçal Peris' painting, Saint Lucy. (Note: Located at the Williams College Museum of Art in Williamstown, Massachusetts.) Conservator Salvador Muñoz-Viñas wrote that "the work of all the painters except Peris was eliminated in an irreversible way" when it was restored via overpainting by an unknown artist in 1983.

== See also ==
- Pentimento – Alteration in a painting evidenced by traces of previous work
