= Nicolas Courjal =

French operatic bass

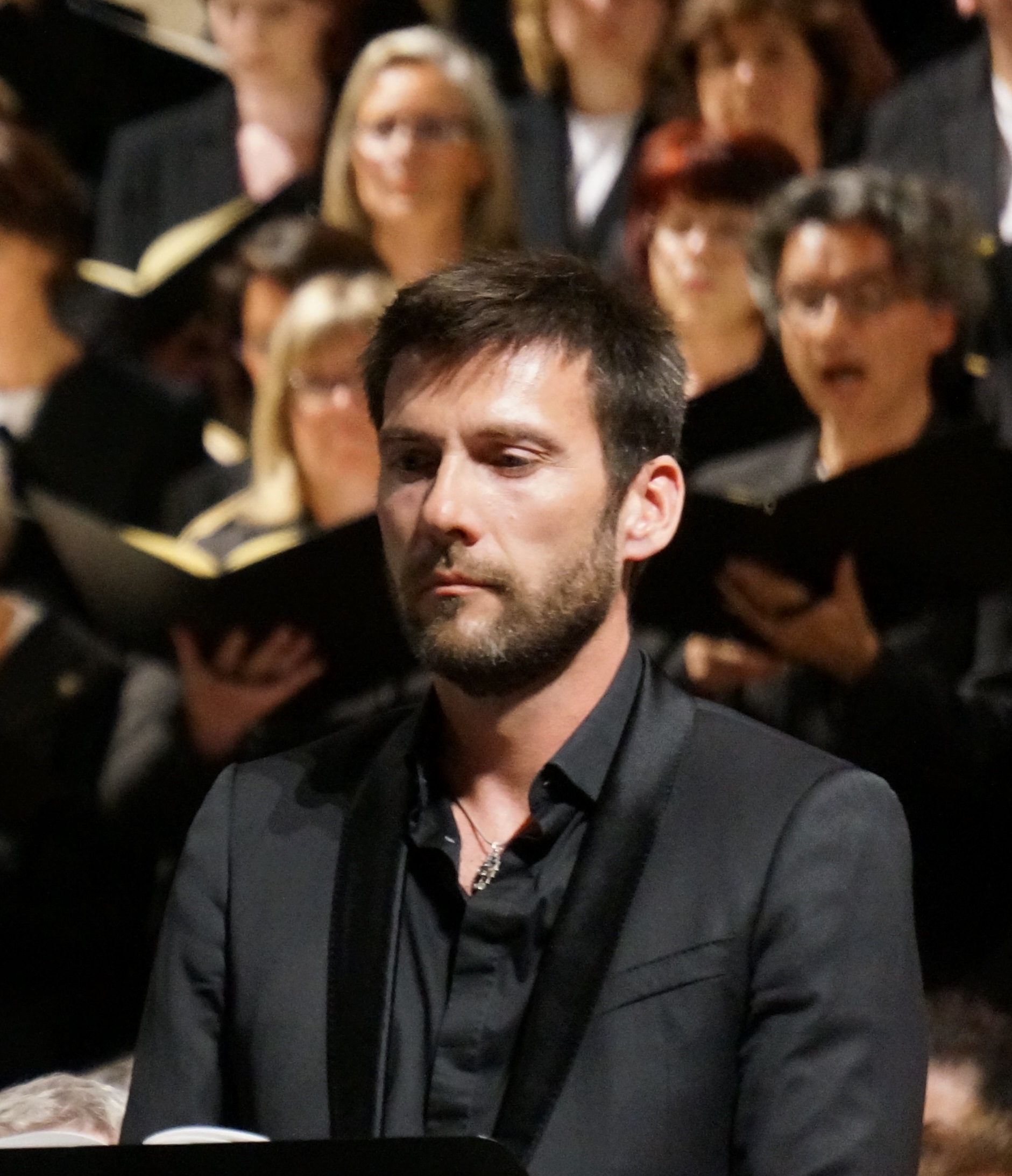
Nicolas Courjal in 2014

Nicolas Courjal (born 18 January 1973) is a French operatic bass.

== Life ==
Born in Rennes, Courjal studied the violin at the Rennes Conservatory. In 1995, he entered Jane Berbié's singing class. He then performed at the Opéra-Comique and the Hessisches Staatstheater Wiesbaden (Germany).

Since 1999, Nicolas Courjal has performed in many French opera houses such as those of Toulouse, Montpellier, Rennes, Avignon, Toulon, Nice, Tours, Vichy as well as at the Chorégies d'Orange, the Théâtre du Châtelet and also at the Opéra Bastille. Abroad, he has performed at La Fenice in Venice and at the Royal Opera House in London, among others.

Courjal received the Arnhold Prize at the Wexford Festival Opera for his role in Massenet's Sapho.

== Selected recordings ==
- Hector Berlioz, Les Troyens, Joyce DiDonato – Didon, Marie-Nicole Lemieux – Cassandre, Stéphane Degout – Chorèbe, Michael Spyres – Enée, Cyrille Dubois – Iopas, Mariane Crebassa – Ascagne, Nicolas Courjal – Narbal, Les Chœurs de l'Opéra national du Rhin, Badischer Staatsopernchor, Orchestre philharmonique de Strasbourg, conducted by John Nelson. 4 CD + 1 DVD Warner 2017. Diapason d'or, Choc de Classica.
- Hector Berlioz, La damnation de Faust, Michael Spyres – Faust, Joyce DiDonato – Marguerite, Nicolas Courjal – Méphistophélès, Alexandre Duhamel – Brander; Les Petits Chanteurs de Strasbourg, Maîtrise de l'Opéra national du Rhin, Orchestre philharmonique de Strasbourg, conducted by John Nelson. 2 CD + 1 DVD Warner Classics 2019. Diapason d'or.
