= Hippolyte Bis =

French playwright and librettist (1789–1855)

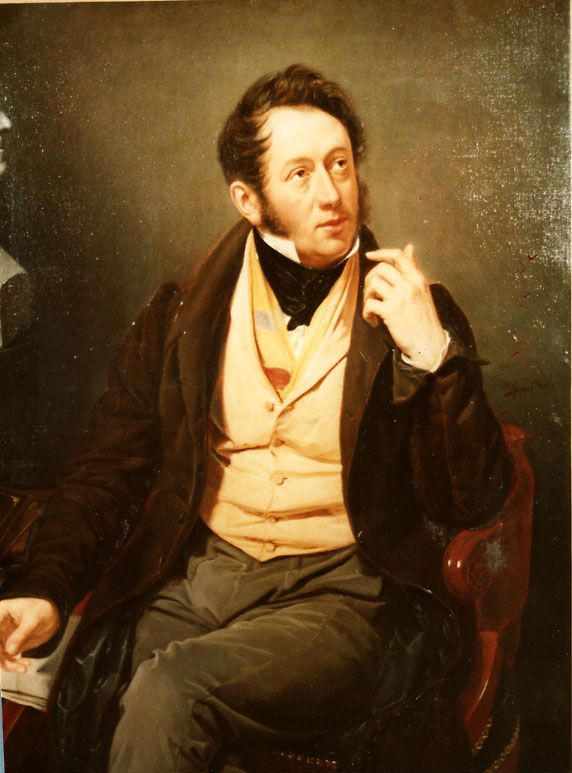
- Portrait of Hippolyte Bis, by Serrur, 1829
- Born: 29 August 1789; Douai
- Died: 3 March 1855 (aged 65); Paris
- Occupations: Playwright; Librettist

Hippolyte Louis Florent Bis (29 August 1789 – 3 March 1855), was an early 19th-century French playwright and librettist. He is mostly known for the libretto to Gioachino Rossini's opera William Tell (premiered in 1829), which he wrote with Étienne de Jouy.

== Works ==
=== Theatre ===
- 1817: Lothaire, tragedy in 3 acts and in verse, with François Hay
- 1822: Attila, five-act tragedy, Paris, Second Théâtre-Français, 26 April
- 1827: Blanche d'Aquitaine, ou le Dernier des Carlovingiens, five-act tragedy, Théâtre-Français, 29 October
- 1845: Jeanne de Flandre, ou Régner à tout prix, tragedy, created by the Théâtre-Français at the salle Richelieu on October 29, a single performance

=== Opera ===
- 1829: William Tell, four-act opera, with Étienne de Jouy, music by Rossini, Paris, Académie royale de musique, 3 August

=== Varia ===
- 1822: Le Cimetière, poème lyrique
- La Marseillaise du Nord, sung 6 December 1830, dans un banquet de Gardes nationaux de Lille et de Douai, après la réception des drapeaux donnés par le roi des Français Louis-Philippe Ier
- Notice sur le Mal Mortier, duc de Trévise, mort assassiné près du roi, le 28 juillet 1835, suivie du programme de l'inauguration de sa statue, le 16 septembre 1838 au Catteau-Cambrésis
- 1839: La Flamande, dittie in 12 couplets avec refrain, réunion des Enfants du Nord du 29 April
- 1842: Le Général Guilleminot, esquisse historique
