= Victor-Joseph Étienne de Jouy =

French dramatist (1764–1846)

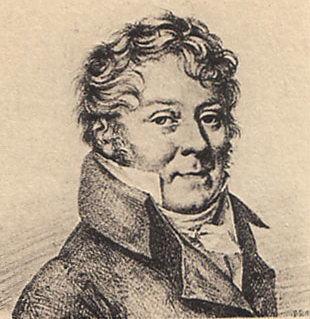

Victor-Joseph Étienne, called de Jouy (French pronunciation: [viktɔʁ ʒozɛf etjɛn də ʒwi]; 19 October 1764 – 4 September 1846), was a French dramatist who abandoned an early military career for a successful literary one.

== Life ==
De Jouy was born at Versailles in 1764. At the age of eighteen he received a commission in the army, and sailed for South America in the company of the governor of Guiana. He returned almost immediately to France to complete his studies, and re-entered the service two years later. He was sent to India, and many of the events there were afterwards turned to literary account. His literary contemporary Stendhal records in his book Memoirs of an Egoist one such violent action, of rape. He writes, "One day in India he [de Jouy] and two or three friends went into a temple to escape the dreadful heat. There they found the priestess, a kind of Vestal Virgin. M. de Jouy found it amusing to maker her unfaithful to Brahma on the very altar of her god. The Indians realised what had happened, came running up in arms, cut the wrists and then the head off the vestal virgin, and cut in half the officer who was a chum of the author of Sylla who, after the death of his friend, managed to climb onto a horse and is still galloping."

On the outbreak of the Revolution he returned to France and served with distinction in the early campaigns, attaining the rank of adjutant-general. He drew suspicion on himself, however, by refusing to honor the toast of Marat, and had to flee for his life.

At the fall of the Terror he resumed his commission but again fell under suspicion, being accused of treasonable correspondence with the English envoy, James Harris, 1st Earl of Malmesbury who had been sent to France to negotiate terms of peace. He was acquitted of this charge, but, weary of repeated attacks, resigned his position on the pretext of his numerous wounds.

At some point de Jouy married the British born daughter of the novelist Lady Mary Hamilton who had moved to France with George Robinson Hamilton.

De Jouy now turned his attention to literature, and produced in 1807 with immense success the libretto for Gaspare Spontini's opera La vestale. The piece ran for a hundred nights, and owing in part to its libretto, was characterized by the Institut de France as the best lyric drama of the day. Other opera librettos followed, including Spontini's Fernand Cortez and Cherubini's Abencérages, but none obtained so great a success. From 1811 to 1814 he published in the weekly Gazette de France a series of satirical sketches of Parisian life, later collected under the title of L'Ermite de la Chaussée d'Antin, ou observations sur les moeurs et les usages français au commencement du xixe siècle (1812–1814, 5 vols.), which was warmly received and made his name as a journalist; he contributed to Le Nain jaune, La Minerve française, Le Miroir, Pandore and L'Observateur. Étienne de Jouy was also one of the founders of the Biographie nouvelle des contemporains, who encouraged contributions from the young journalist François Buloz whom he had employed in his chemical factory and who would have a distinguished career guiding the Revue des deux mondes.

In 1821 his tragedy of Sylla gained a triumph due in part to the genius of the actor Talma, who had studied the title-rôle from Napoleon; it opened 27 December 1821 at the Théâtre-Français. Under the Restoration Jouy consistently fought for the cause of freedom, and if his work was overrated by his contemporaries, they were probably influenced by their respect for the author himself. He died in rooms set apart for his use in the Château de St Germain-en-Laye, 4 September 1846.

== Works ==
Some of the most notable out of the long list of his opera librettos, tragedies and miscellaneous writings are:

- Milton (1804), opera, in collaboration with A.-M. Dieulafoy, music by Spontini
- La Vestale (1807), opera, music by Spontini
- Fernand Cortez (1809), opera, in collaboration with J.-A. Esménard, music by Spontini
- Les amazones, ou La fondation de Thèbes (1811), opera, music by Étienne Méhul
- Tippo Saeb, tragedy (1813)
- Les Abencérages, ou L'étendard de Grenade (1813), opera, music by Cherubini
- Belisaire, tragedy (1818)
- Les Hermites en prison (1823), written in collaboration with Antoine Jay, like himself a political prisoner
- Moïse et Pharaon (1827), opera, with Luigi Balocchi, music by Rossini
- Guillaume Tell (1829), opera, with Hippolyte Bis, music by Rossini.

== See also ==
- Badaud
