= Patrician cantons =

Patrician-ruled cantons of the Old Swiss Confederacy

Patrician cantons (German: Patrizische Orte; French: cantons à régime patricien) is a historiographical term for the city-states of the Old Swiss Confederacy governed by a patrician elite: Bern, Lucerne, Fribourg, and Solothurn. The term was coined by analogy with that of the rural cantons (Länderorte).

The discussion of the patrician cantons was prompted by historiography of the Swiss Ancien Régime, which from 1950 onward contrasted guild cities (Zunftstädte), patrician cities, and rural cantons. This tripartite political division was taken up by Ulrich Im Hof in 1977 in his Handbuch der Schweizer Geschichte, and critically examined by Hans Conrad Peyer in 1978 with respect to constitutional law and constitutional practice. The typological distinction between patrician cantons and guild cities is unsatisfactory, since it is tailored only to the capital cities, leaves out the cities of French-speaking Switzerland, and is hardly able to identify fundamental differences between the two types of city.

== City constitution as the basis of a general aristocratization ==
In fact, patrician cantons and guild cities had much in common. Most of them were imperial cities, and their late medieval constitutions—whether with or without guilds—were similar in the organization, election, and powers of the burgher community and the councils, and they allowed an aristocratization to take hold under the Ancien Régime without major changes. The burgher community (the assembly of all adult male burghers) had few powers and rarely convened. The council of the 12th and 13th centuries expanded in both types of city in the 14th into a Small Council of 20 to 60 members (the "heads"), with a Grand Council of 60 to 200 members alongside it. The Grand Council—often referred to as "the burghers," as it represented them—was constitutionally the supreme body. It met at most once a week, usually together with the Small Council, which led and dominated its proceedings. Since the Small Council, charged with handling current affairs, met several times a week, it gradually became the de facto government. Because its members had to be available, they were drawn everywhere from the wealthy class.

The aristocratization of the leading class was promoted by several developments. First, from the end of the 16th century, many cities granted citizenship ever more sparingly, and later hardly at all, so that the body of burghers closed in on itself, narrowing the circle of families admitted to the council. Second, the system of cooptation (self-replacement) used to fill council seats allowed the families represented on the council to bring in their relatives and so build up genuine family dynasties.

The guilds in the guild cities, and the artisan societies in the patrician cantons, both played an important role in this aristocratization—but in different ways. In the guild cities, the guilds were themselves constitutional electoral bodies: each guild had the right to return a fixed quota of small and grand councillors. In the patrician cantons, the societies had no such automatic right of representation; instead, membership in a society was the practical entry point to political life, since their drinking halls were the forums of political and social activity, and anyone seeking a public career had to belong to one. The main exception was Bern, where the four privileged Vennergesellschaften elected the Venner and the Sixteen (Sechzehner), and Solothurn, where the eleven guilds also returned representatives to the council. This led everywhere to the takeover of artisan societies and guilds by members of the upper class, who—although removed from the trades themselves—bought their way in. In Bern the four Vennergesellschaften were the most sought-after by aspirants to council seats; in Lucerne, the Saffron, Tailors', and Furriers' guilds. Great families spread themselves across several societies, in order to have different family members elected to the councils. Through this, the urban upper class gradually pushed the artisans out of the councils in every city except St. Gallen.

== Sources of wealth ==
The council families of the patrician cantons differed clearly from the aristocrats of the guild cities in the basis of their wealth. Patrician prosperity rested above all on privately owned land and lordships, on income from military entrepreneurship and from officers' service in foreign armies, and on the fees of office and council service. The leading class of the guild cities, by contrast, lived primarily from trade, manufacture, and finance. In the Catholic patrician cantons (Lucerne, Solothurn, and Fribourg), patricians could also pursue careers in religious orders, in chapters and monasteries; for the Reformed Bernese patricians, the administration of monastic lordships secularized at the Reformation offered comparable positions.

In the 17th century, income from foreign service and pensions and from private justiciary lordships shrank, while the cost of maintaining patrician status rose. The salaries of councillors and officeholders, however, were gradually raised to substantial sums. As a result, the patriciate turned increasingly to careers in office and on the council. The high prestige of state service gave rise in Bern to a patriciate whose status came chiefly from holding administrative office.

Over time, cooptation in council elections produced a division between the families that actually governed and those that were merely "eligible to govern" (regimentsfähig), but were less and less represented—or not at all—in the Small Council, and even in the Grand Council. Office rotation and re-election made council seats effectively lifelong and, in combination with cooptation, effectively hereditary. Time worked in favor of the powerful, populous families; the smaller ones had to fear losing their Grand Council seat and dropping out of the governing circle altogether.

== Opposition to patrician rule ==
The de facto monopoly of the aristocratic families over council seats, and through them over the lucrative state offices, encountered resistance in patrician cantons and guild cities alike. Burgher families that were nominally "eligible to govern" but in practice excluded from the councils opposed the electoral practices of those in power. Urban revolts of this kind took place in Lucerne in 1609–1610 (the Knabhandel), in 1651–1653 (the Burgerhandel, or burghers' affair), and in 1768–1770 (the Klosterhandel, an ecclesiastically framed power struggle among patrician families that drew in other strata of the burghers); in Bern in 1710, 1735, 1744, and above all in 1749 (the Henzi conspiracy); and in Fribourg in 1780–1784 (the Chenaux uprising). The conspirators met in private houses (Bern in 1749) or in guild drinking halls (Lucerne in 1651–1653).

The revolts shook the patrician governments, but, like reform initiatives from within those governments themselves, they had no lasting effect, especially since the rulers responded with death sentences and banishments for the conspirators and rolled back concessions granted in moments of weakness (as in Lucerne in 1653). In Bern, in connection with an administrative reform aimed at the Small Council's mismanagement of state revenues through its Vennerkammer (1681–1691), the Grand Council had itself confirmed as the supreme constitutional authority by a commission and took measures, soon weakened in practice, against electoral abuses, requiring newly elected Grand Councillors to swear a Reinigungseid (purgation oath) disavowing electoral malpractice. Fribourg in 1650 and Bern in 1710 combated 'Praktizieren—the practice of buying votes through gifts and favors—by introducing the drawing of lots for public offices. Solothurn, which improved its electoral procedures in 1653 after an episode of intrigue, experienced no revolt.

== Family rule ==
Unlike the council families of the guild cities, the patrician families largely succeeded in shielding themselves against newcomers from the burghers, and especially from among new burghers. Lucerne's Fundamental Law of 1773 crowned two centuries of restrictive policy on citizenship by fixing for good the number of families "eligible to govern." Bern, in its constitutional law of 1790, decided that new burghers would be admitted only if the number of families eligible to govern fell below 236. In 1782 and 1783, Fribourg and Bern respectively sought to smooth over the differences and occasional tensions within their patriciates between families of noble and burgher origin, by authorizing the latter to adopt the nobiliary prefix "von" before their family names.

== Bibliography ==
- E. Brunner, "Patriziat und Adel im alten Bern", in Berner Zeitschrift für Geschichte und Heimatkunde, 1964, pp. 1–13.
- K. Messmer, P. Hoppe, Luzerner Patriziat, 1976.
- Handbuch der Schweizer Geschichte, vol. 2, pp. 750–756.
- Peyer, Verfassung, pp. 48–55, 107–116.
- A.-M. Dubler, Handwerk, Gewerbe und Zunft in Stadt und Landschaft Luzern, 1982, pp. 120–134.
- Braun, Ancien Régime, pp. 207–251.
- D. Schläppi, Die Zunftgesellschaft zu Schmieden in Bern zwischen Tradition und Moderne, 2001.
