= Länderorte =

Rural cantons of the Old Swiss Confederacy

The Länderorte (French: cantons campagnards) is a term used mainly by historians for the rural cantons of the Old Swiss Confederacy: Uri, Schwyz, Obwalden, Nidwalden, Glarus, and Appenzell. Zug, though it occupied a middle position between the urban and rural cantons, is generally counted among the Länderorte on account of its Landsgemeinde constitution. The allied territories of the Grisons and Valais, despite many similarities, are not included, as they were associated states rather than full cantons. The term is used above all for the period of the old Confederacy: the Länderorte are contrasted with the urban cantons—the guild cities and the patrician cantons—both to highlight their differences and to point out what they had in common.

== Terminology ==
In documents of the 13th and 14th centuries, the term universitas referred to the constitutions of the rural cantons as political entities, while their territories were called vallis or Tal (valley)—for example, the homines vallis Uraniae (men of the valley of Uri) of 1291. From the early 14th century onward, these were referred to as Lant (1318), and their inhabitants as Landleute (in the Morgarten Pact of 1315). From the Lucerne Pact of 1332 to the Appenzell Pact of 1513, terms derived from Land (die lenderen, die lender, Landleute; in modern historiography Länderort) appear consistently in all federal pacts, the only exception being the Zug Pact of 1352, which speaks of "town and bailiwick of Zug".

== Geography and economy ==
All of the Länderorte lay in the Alps and the Pre-Alps. Apart from Zug, they had no urban centers, and until the 19th century their transport connections were poor. Social inequalities were less pronounced than in the urban cantons. The agricultural sector dominated, and from the late Middle Ages onward it specialized in livestock and dairy farming; a large share of the productive land consisted of Alpine pastures. Everywhere, communal lands (Gemeinmarchen) existed—chiefly forests, commons, and Alpine pastures—either administered and used by the canton as a whole (in Uri and Schwyz) or held by smaller associations such as communes or Tagwen. The collective use of these lands contributed to the political awareness of the inhabitants. At the threshold of the late Middle Ages, the founding cantons of Central Switzerland obtained Imperial immediacy. Owing to this and to the relative distance of the imperial court, they soon took on certain sovereign prerogatives. The development was favored by the fact that these original Swiss cantons long remained peripheral in the eyes of their lords and so escaped a strong feudal grip.

== Landsgemeinde democracy ==
In the 13th and 14th centuries, a distinctive form of constitution emerged in Central Switzerland, with the Landsgemeinde, the landamman, the council, and the court. This has been described as a "Landsgemeinde democracy" or, in more recent historiography, as "communal parliamentarism". Rural communes with assemblies similar to the Landsgemeinde were not uncommon, but those of the founding Swiss valley communities were distinctive in their durability and in the fact that they exercised not only judicial but also legislative powers. For this reason, the Landsgemeinde came to be called the "sovereign power" in the early modern period. Under the influence of Central Switzerland, and especially of Schwyz, Landsgemeinde democracy was adopted in Zug (1376), Glarus (after 1386), and Appenzell (1403).

In formal terms, the constitutions of the rural cantons resembled those of the urban cantons: they had counterparts to the burgher assembly, the burgomaster or Schultheiss, and the Grand and Small Councils. But the transfer of political authority to the level of the full-right male inhabitants (the Landleute or burghers) took place earlier in the Länderorte, and their Landsgemeinden remained regular, annually held assemblies that constitutionally formed the supreme power. The burgher assemblies of the urban cantons, by contrast, appeared later and, in the early modern period, lost their regularity and their original constitutional significance.

== Leadership and oligarchization ==
In the 13th and 14th centuries, political leadership in the rural cantons lay mainly with noble or ministerial families. There was also a peasant leading class, which had its greatest influence in Schwyz. Over the course of the 14th and early 15th centuries, the nobles and ministerials were overthrown or displaced. This went hand in hand with the freeing of land and churches from feudal ties to the benefit of peasants and parishioners. A new leading class emerged, drawn above all from the larger peasant families, and from it a group of magisterial families came to the fore. In the early modern period, these families consolidated their dominance through participation in foreign military service, landholding and capital, and in some cases industry and commerce (Appenzell Ausserrhoden and Glarus), enabling them to claim most of the influential cantonal offices. In this respect the government of the Länderorte resembled that of the urban cantons, and its democratic character must be regarded critically; the rural cantons too had residents without full burgher rights (Hintersassen) and subject territories. Social mobility and the possibility of rising into the important offices were nevertheless greater than in the cities, and oligarchization was less pronounced.

== Relations with the urban cantons ==
Within the eight-canton Confederacy, the urban and rural cantons complemented each other, but their relationship was soon marked by a certain dualism. Social, political, and cultural tensions emerged. Led by Schwyz, the rural cantons championed the peasant-libertarian element, for example in the Appenzell Wars (1401–1429) and in the affair of the seal and banner (Siegel- und Bannerhandel) at Zug in 1404. The expansionist aims of Schwyz and Obwalden in particular cut across the interests of the cities and led to unrest and wars: the Old Zürich War (1436–1450), the Grüningen affair (1441), the Böser Bund in the Bernese Oberland (1445), and the Amstalden affair (1478). With the rising demographic and economic weight of the cities, now ruling considerable territories, these tensions grew more pronounced and, after the Burgundian Wars, led to a serious crisis that was only with difficulty resolved by the Stanser Verkommnis of 1481. The Reformation and the resulting confessional split overlaid the traditional rivalry between cities and rural cantons with a religious one. The rural cantons, with the exception of Appenzell Ausserrhoden and the confessionally mixed Glarus, remained in the Catholic camp, which suffered defeat in the Second War of Villmergen of 1712. This outcome reflected the new balance of power that had developed since 1500 between the great cities of the Plateau and the predominantly rural Alpine and Pre-Alpine regions.

== Legacy ==
The political, economic, and social upheavals from the early 19th century onward deprived the rural cantons of much of their constitutional specificity, and although they retained certain economic peculiarities, these are today more commonly associated with the categories of "mountain regions" or "Alpine cantons." Some legacy nevertheless remained: in the early Swiss federal state, representatives of these cantons appeared as an informal grouping known as the "Landamman party" (Landammänner-Partei), and later contributed to the foundation and national development of the Catholic-conservative party tradition that became the Christian Democratic People's Party (now part of The Centre).

== Bibliography ==
- H. Dommann, "Das Gemeinschaftsbewusstsein der V Orte in der Alten Eidgenossenschaft", in Geschichtsfreund, 96, 1943, pp. 115–229.
- Appenzeller Geschichte.
- B. Stettler, "Die Herren von Hunwil im Land Obwalden", in Geschichtsfreund, 126/127, 1973/1974, pp. 5–32.
- L. Carlen, Die Landsgemeinde in der Schweiz, 1976.
- Peyer, Verfassung.
- J. Achermann, Die Korporationen von Nidwalden, 1980.
- F. Elsener et al., 500 Jahre Stanser Verkommnis, 1981.
- H. R. Stauffacher, Herrschaft und Landsgemeinde, 1989.
- Innerschweiz und frühe Eidgenossenschaft, 2 vols., 1990.
- U. Kälin, Die Urner Magistratenfamilien, 1991.
- E. Walder, Das Stanser Verkommnis, 1994.
