= Guild cities =

Swiss cities governed by guild constitutions

Guild cities (German: Zunftstädte; French: villes corporatives) is a term used for the Swiss cities that, in the Middle Ages and under the Ancien Régime, had a political system based on guilds: Zürich, Basel, Schaffhausen, and St. Gallen. These were autonomous city-states—though St. Gallen had no subject territory—in which manufacturers, artisans, and merchants dominated the economy and constitutionally enjoyed considerable political influence. The label is hardly ever applied to other cities, whether Protestant (such as Biel, Winterthur, Stein am Rhein, and Chur) or Catholic (such as Rapperswil and Rheinfelden), even though these also had guild-based regimes. Conversely, the capitals of the patrician cantons likewise had guilds (or societies) with political functions.

== Concept and historiography ==
Zunftstadt is not a term found in the historical sources, but a coinage of German-Swiss historians, probably around 1950. It does not appear in works on Swiss, cantonal, or urban history written before that date, which instead use expressions such as "guild aristocracy" (Wilhelm Oechsli) or "guild-based urban aristocracy" (Richard Feller). The term first appears in constitutional-history studies: Alfred Müller and Kurt Bächtold (who also speaks of "guild states") used it to contrast guild-based regimes with patrician ones. In French-speaking Switzerland and Ticino, guilds played only an economic role and had no political influence.

In 1977, Ulrich Im Hof put forward his concept of a tripartite division of the old Confederacy into rural cantons (Länderorte), guild cities, and patrician cantons. Hans Conrad Peyer adopted this scheme but examined it critically, drawing out the differences between constitutional law and constitutional practice. Although the triad had become standard, it was not taken up in the Geschichte der Schweiz und der Schweizer (1982–1983). The typological distinction between guild and patrician cities is in any case unsatisfactory, since the scheme is too narrowly tailored to the sovereign cities and excludes others, especially in French-speaking Switzerland. The concept of "guild aristocracy" comes closer to historical reality than that of Zunftstadt, a term that has not gained currency in German-speaking countries outside Switzerland, even though guild-based imperial cities also existed there.

== Constitutional features ==
The introduction of the guild constitution in Zürich in 1336, Basel in 1337, St. Gallen in 1354, and Schaffhausen in 1411 was the outcome of generally peaceful processes that often lasted decades; the only exception was Brun's revolution in Zürich. Under this regime, the guilds became electoral bodies, alongside the patrician societies (the Hohe Stube in Basel, the Konstaffel in Zürich). The guild assemblies—or in Basel, the guild governing committee—elected from their own members the guild masters who made up half of the Small Council. In Schaffhausen and St. Gallen, the guilds also elected their delegations to the Grand Council; otherwise the Grand and Small Councils filled vacancies by co-optation. The burgomasters and chief guild masters were elected by the Grand Council, or in St. Gallen by the assembly of burghers.

The difficulty of drawing a clean typological distinction between guild and patrician cities is that in the 14th and 15th centuries, there were no essential differences between them in the organization, election, or powers of the burgher community and the councils, and that under the Ancien Régime all of them evolved without major breaks toward oligarchization and thus displayed aristocratic and patrician features. All could belong to the imperial cities. The general assembly of full burghers, first attested in the 14th century, had few powers; it was convened once or twice a year for oath-taking and every five years for the renewal of alliances. The council of the 12th and 13th centuries split in the 14th into a Small Council of twenty to sixty members (including the chief magistrates) and a Grand Council of sixty to 200 members. The latter, as the actual sovereign, was not accountable to any burgher assembly; as in the patrician cantons, it represented the burghers and formed constitutionally the supreme body, into which the Small Council was integrated and with which it usually sat. Because the Small Council often met daily and exercised the most important functions, it gradually became, in practice, the government. Its members had to be able to devote their time, and were therefore drawn—as in the patrician cities—from the wealthy class; already in the 15th century, some of them were free of any professional activity.

The oligarchization of the councils began in the 16th century, as in the patrician cities. This development was favored by the increasing closure of the burgher class, by the attractiveness of lucrative offices reserved for councillors (Vogtei and the administration of Church property secularized at the Reformation), by life tenure of council seats (through office rotation and re-election) made practically hereditary through the sale of offices and corruption, and by the takeover of the artisan guilds by the wealthy class of merchants, entrepreneurs, officers, and rentiers (landlords and justiciary lords). In Zürich the trend began as early as 1498, when merchants were given the right to enroll in any guild of their choice rather than only in the Konstaffel; they were thus able to plan their political careers. Great families spread themselves across several guilds in order to capture more council seats. As the Small Council concentrated power in its hands, it also became the preserve of a few families leading an aristocratic way of life, to the exclusion of artisans who still practiced their trades.

The dominance of the merchants, entrepreneurs, and rentiers, consolidated in the 17th century, and the growing power of the Small Council at the expense of the Grand Council, did not go unopposed. Between 1680 and 1720, the artisans of the guilds rose against the oligarchy: in Schaffhausen in 1689, in Basel in 1691, and in Zürich in 1713. They did not succeed in driving the merchants out of government, but in Basel and St. Gallen they restored the Grand Council, as an emanation of the guilds, to first place. In Zürich and Schaffhausen, the Small Council narrowly preserved its preeminence. Election by lot was introduced in Schaffhausen in 1689 and in Basel in 1718. The old council families of the guild cities thus did not succeed, as those of the patrician cantons did, in shielding themselves against newcomers from the artisanate, and were unable to reserve access to government to themselves alone. In St. Gallen, which lacked subject territories and thus offered no lucrative bailiwicks, the upper class of great merchants and entrepreneurs showed little interest in council seats, leaving most of them to the artisans; no political oligarchy formed there.

The Helvetic Revolution of 1798 abolished the guild constitutions, which were partly restored from 1803 onward. In Basel, certain elements of the old system survived until 1875.

== See also ==
- Guilds in Switzerland

== Bibliography ==
- Schweizerisches Idiotikon, vol. 11, cols. 1702–1712.
- W. Oechsli, Geschichte der Schweiz im neunzehnten Jahrhundert, vol. 1, 1903.
- H. Nabholz et al., Geschichte der Schweiz, vol. 1, 1932.
- A. Müller, "Die Ratsverfassung der Stadt Basel von 1521 bis 1798", in Basler Zeitschrift für Geschichte und Altertumskunde, vol. 53, 1954, pp. 5–98.
- K. Bächtold, "Wandlungen der Zunftverfassung", in Schaffhauser Beiträge, vol. 38, 1961, pp. 46–81.
- Peyer, Verfassung.
- Handbuch der Schweizer Geschichte.
- Geschichte der Schweiz und der Schweizer, 3 vols., 1982–1983 (3rd ed. 2004).
- E. Isenmann, Die deutsche Stadt im Spätmittelalter, 1988.
- Handwörterbuch zur deutschen Rechtsgeschichte, vol. 4, cols. 1863–1874.
- Lexikon des Mittelalters, vol. 8, cols. 30–31.
