= Henzi conspiracy =

1749 plot against the Bernese patriciate

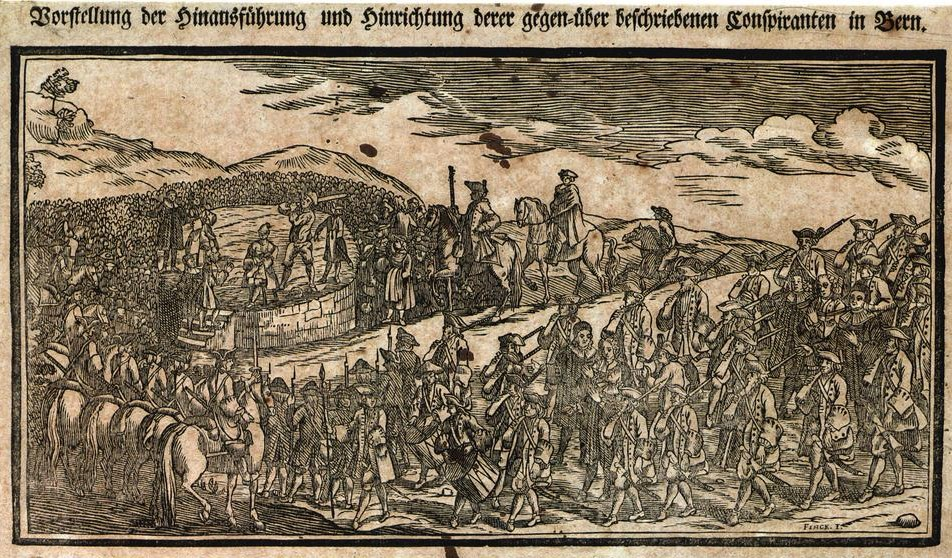
- Depiction of the arrest and execution of the conspirators described above in Bern; execution of Samuel Niklaus Wernier, Samuel Henzi, and Emanuel Fueter (1749); possibly an illustration from the journal "Der hinkende Bot"
- Date: 25 June – 17 July 1749
- Location: Bern, Republic of Bern
- Caused by: Monopolization of government offices by a shrinking patrician oligarchy
- Goals: Reform of the constitution of Bern; broadening of access to government
- Methods: Conspiracy, planned coup d'état
- Result: Conspiracy betrayed and crushed; ringleaders executed

Parties
Excluded burghers of Bern	Bernese patriciate

Lead figures
Samuel Henzi (executed); Niklaus Wernier (executed); Emanuel Fueter (executed); Gabriel Fueter; Gottfried Kuhn	

Casualties and losses
- 3 executed; around 70 arrested; others placed under house arrest or banished

The Henzi conspiracy (German: Henzi-Verschwörung; French: conjuration de Henzi) was a plot organized in 1749 by burghers of Bern excluded from the Small Council to overthrow the ruling patriciate, which then comprised only about 80 of the 350 burgher families of the city. The conspiracy, betrayed before it could be carried out, ended with the execution of three of its leaders, including Samuel Henzi, from whom it took its name.

== Background ==
The struggle for power in 1749 can be compared with other urban revolts in the patrician cantons of the 17th and 18th centuries. It challenged the absolute power of an ever-smaller number of families who monopolized seats on the Council and, consequently, the most lucrative offices. The families that had been pushed aside had already voiced their discontent in 1710, 1735, and 1744, demanding in pamphlets a change in the mode of election to the Great Council and an opening of the patriciate by admitting all burghers to government. The patrician reaction in 1744 had been accompanied by violent repression; Samuel Henzi, author of one of the pamphlets, had been banished along with other agitators. Initially called the Burgerlärm in Bern, the affair acquired the name "Henzi conspiracy" only after articles appeared in the foreign press.

== The conspiracy ==
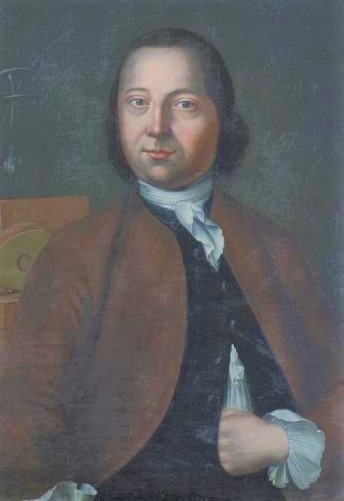
Johann Friedrich Küpfer (1740)

The initiators of the 1749 conspiracy were artisans and small entrepreneurs such as Gabriel and Emanuel Fueter, Niklaus Wernier, and Gottfried Kuhn, who persuaded Henzi to lend them his pen. In a new pamphlet, Henzi outlined a reorganization of the Bernese state combining traditional elements (guilds) with revolutionary ones: a communal assembly as the highest authority, term limits for magistrates elected by the people, a reorganization of the Small Council, annual accounts for the state treasury, and access to the archives. The conspiracy was launched on 25 June 1749 at the indienne printworks of Johann Friedrich Küpfer at the Sulgenbach, but was betrayed on 2 July by the theology student Friedrich Ulrich, while the plans for the coup were still vague.

== Suppression and aftermath ==
Fearing a general insurrection, the government acted swiftly. Following a secret inquiry in Bern on 3 July, the city was placed under military guard the next day and some seventy conspirators were arrested. Of the ringleaders, only Gabriel Fueter and Gottfried Kuhn managed to escape. Although the conspiracy was thus dismantled, the punishment was severe and meant as a deterrent: Henzi, Wernier, and Emanuel Fueter were beheaded on 17 July, and the others placed under house arrest or banished. Opposition to the patriciate was thereby silenced for a long time. Only in 1779 did the descendants of the conspirators recover their right of burghership, and in 1780 the surviving conspirators were allowed to return home. The affair drew wide attention, especially in the foreign press, which regarded it as a genuine revolt. Lessing took it as the subject of a drama, partially published in 1753.

== Bibliography ==
- Feller, Bern, 3, 447–463.
- A. Würgler, Unruhen und Öffentlichkeit, 1995, especially 99–106, 207–212, 240–243.
- U. Hafner, "Auf der Suche nach Bürgertugend. Die Verfasstheit der Republik Bern in der Sicht der Opposition von 1749", in Republikanische Tugend, ed. M. Böhler et al., 2000, 283–299.
