= Amstalden affair =

1478 conspiracy against the city of Lucerne

The Amstalden affair (German: Amstaldenhandel) was a 1478 conspiracy against the city of Lucerne led by Peter Amstalden of the Entlebuch valley, with encouragement from Obwalden. The plot was uncovered and Amstalden executed. The affair, which grew out of broader tensions between the urban and rural cantons of the Confederacy, was one of the main causes of the conclusion of the Stanser Verkommnis of 1481.

== Background ==
The Amstalden affair was a side effect of the dispute over rights of Burgrecht and arose from opposition by the rural cantons (Länderorte) of Central Switzerland to Lucerne's accession to the Confederate alliance of cities of 23 May 1477. Obwalden was particularly aggrieved, as the Entlebuch was the last remaining direction in which it could hope for territorial expansion. It exploited the latent dissatisfaction in the Entlebuch with the growing consolidation of Lucerne's territorial lordship, and influenced the inhabitants of the valley, who came to rely on Obwalden's support. Attempts to extend the opposition to other Lucerne bailiwicks failed in the face of their passivity.

== Conspiracy and execution ==
Peter Amstalden emerged as a leading figure in the Entlebuch with his demand for direct access to information and for Entlebuch representation in the Lucerne councils. When the authorities, hardening in their policy of exclusion, rejected this demand, Amstalden began planning a surprise attack on Lucerne during the autumn fair of 1478. He was encouraged by the Obwaldners Hans Künegger and landamman Heinrich Bürgler, who promised him exile and compensation in Obwalden in case of failure. The conspiracy was uncovered before it could be carried out. Amstalden was imprisoned in Lucerne on 24 August 1478, tried, and executed; his condemnation with loss of honor was intended as a deterrent.

The valley of Entlebuch, by contrast, was publicly restored to its honor through a costly muster of arms (Harnischschau), a formal inspection of armed men, held in the city of Lucerne. This demonstrative show of trust in the armed men of Entlebuch—from whose midst a surprise attack had so recently been planned—exemplifies Lucerne's policy of dividing and ruling. Lucerne's position as territorial lord went unchallenged until the Zwiebelnkrieg (Onion War) of 1513. Obwalden's interference in Lucerne's sphere of influence, however, weighed heavily on Lucerne's relations with the rest of Central Switzerland until the Stanser Verkommnis of 1481.

== Bibliography ==
- D. Suter-Schmid, Koller-, Mötteli- und Amstaldenhandel, 1974.
- E. Wechsler, Ehre und Politik, 1991.
