= Municipal council (Switzerland) =

In Switzerland, the term municipal council (German: Gemeinderat) refers, depending on the commune and canton, either to the elected executive body of a commune (Gemeindeexekutive) or to its elected legislative body (Gemeindeparlament). In most Swiss communes, the Gemeinderat is the executive body, while a separate name is used for the elected legislature (where one exists). In the cantons of Zürich and parts of Bern, however, the term refers to the elected legislative body, with the executive going by another name such as Stadtrat.

Communes that do not have an elected legislature are instead governed by a communal assembly, a direct-democratic body open to all eligible citizens. The decision between an assembly and an elected parliament generally depends on the size of the commune.

== Functions ==
In most smaller municipalities that do not have a parliament, the executive branch (and its members) is called the municipal council. It usually consists of five to nine members, one of whom holds the office of mayor (in some cantons also called mayor or chief magistrate; the term "mayor" is used in German-speaking Switzerland only in a historical context). Municipal councillors usually serve part-time or on a voluntary basis, while in larger cities like Bern or Zürich, they are full-time. Many small municipalities struggle to find enough candidates. In municipalities without a parliament, the municipal assembly assumes the role of the legislative branch. In most cantons, the municipal assembly is chaired by the mayor. However, in the canton of Bern, a municipal assembly president is specifically elected for this task, who holds the office for a legislative term. Usually town meetings are the governing body in the smallest municipalities.

Especially in cities in the Canton of Bern, the executive branch is called the municipal council and the legislative branch the city council; in smaller municipalities, the parliament is called the larger municipal council. In the majority of small municipalities in the Canton of Zurich, the municipal council is the executive branch; in the larger cities, however (City of Zurich, City of Winterthur), the municipal council or larger municipal council (Winterthur) is the legislative branch; the city council here holds the executive function.

Municipal executives are usually elected by majority vote, but in some cities and municipalities, such as Bern and Biel, proportional representation is used. In some municipalities, the mayor or city president is also elected by the people, while in others, this task is performed annually by the parliament. A rotating system is generally the norm.

The tasks and powers of municipal executives vary considerably. In many municipalities without a parliament, there are committees that perform some legislative as well as executive functions. Examples include finance committees (usually tasked with preparing the municipal budget) or social welfare committees (which in some municipalities are responsible for allocating social assistance). In some municipalities, the executive's role is limited to overseeing and managing the administration, while in others it is itself responsible for administrative tasks. The elected executive body is responsible for municipal policy and is divided into departments or divisions.

== Overview by canton ==
Elected legislatures of communes by canton
Canton	Number of communes	Name of elected legislature	Number of members	Term of the legislature	Number of communes with an elected legislature	Legal basis
CH-ZH	162 communes in the canton of Zürich	according to the law of the commune in practice: Gemeinderat; Grosser Gemeinderat; Gemeindeparlament	according to the law of the commune in practice between 28 and 150 members	4 years	13 communes	Gemeindegesetz (Municipal law)
CH-BE	342 communes in the canton of Bern	according to the law of the commune in practice *French: Conseil de ville, conseil général *German: Stadtrat, Grosser Gemeinderat Gemeindeparlament	minimum 30 members in practice between 31 and 80 members	maximum 6 years in practice 4 years	13 communes	Loi sur les communes
CH-LU	82 communes in canton of Lucerne	according to the law of the commune	according to the law of the commune	4 years		Gemeindegesetz (Municipal law)
CH-UR	20 communes in the canton of Uri	the communes of Uri don't have parliaments				Gemeindegesetz (Municipal law)
CH-SZ	30 communes in the canton of Schwytz	according to the law of the commune (no parliament as of October 2020)				Gemeindeorganisationsgesetz
CH-OW	7 communes in canton of Obwald	the communes of Obwald do not have parliaments				Constitution cantonale
CH-NW (Note: The communes of Nidwald do not have parliaments, unless they adopt an organisation known as "extraordinary" (aussordentliche Organisation) after merging with a school district.)	11 communes in the canton of Nidwald	Einwohnerrat	20 to 50 members	4 years		Gemeindegesetz (Municipal law); Behördengesetz
CH-GL	3 communes in the canton of Glarus	according to the law of the commune (no parliament as of October 2020)				' Gemeindegesetz (Municipal law)
CH-ZG	11 communes in the canton of Zug	Grosser Gemeinderat only Zug has a parliament	according to the law of the canton minimum 20 members 40 members (in practice)	according to the law of the commune 4 years (in practice)		Gemeindegesetz (Municipal law)
CH-FR	133 communes in the canton of Fribourg	Conseil général/Generalrat	from 30 to 80 members	5 years		Loi sur les communes
CH-SO (Note: Olten is the only commune in the canton of Soleure with a parliament.)	109 communes in the canton of Soleure	according to the law of the commune	minimum 20 members	according to the law of the commune		Gemeindegesetz (Municipal law)
CH-BS (Note: the authorities of the canton manage the commune of Bâle (§ 18 GG/BS); Bettingen does not have a parliament.)	3 communes in the canton of Bâle-Ville	according to the law of the canton and the commune (Bâle: Grand Conseil; Riehen: Einwohnerrat)	according to the law of the canton and the commune (Bâle: 100 members; Riehen: 40 members	according to the law of the canton and the commune (Bâle and Riehen: 4 years)		Gemeindegesetz (Municipal law)
CH-BL	86 communes in the canton of Bâle-Campagne	Einwohnerrat	according to the law of the commune	4 years		Gemeindegesetz (Municipal law)
CH-SH	26 communes in the canton of Schaffhouse	Einwohnerrat except Schaffhouse: Grosser Stadtrat	minimum 12 members (according to the law of the canton) between 13 and 36 members (in practice)	4 years (in practice)		Gemeindegesetz (Municipal law)
CH-AI	6 districts in the canton of Appenzell Rhodes-Intérieures no communes	the districts of Appenzell Rhodes-Intérieures do not have parliaments				Constitution cantonale
CH-AR (Note: Herisau is the only commune of canton of Appenzell Rhodes-Extérieures with a parliament.)	30 communes in the canton of Appenzell Rhodes-Extérieures	according to the law of the commune (in practice Einwohnerrat)	according to the law of the commune (in practice 31 members)	4 years		Gemeindegesetz (Municipal law)
CH-SG	133 communes in the canton of Saint-Gall	according to the law of the commune (in practice Stadtparlament)	according to the law of the commune (in practice between 30 and 61 members)	4 years		Gemeindegesetz (Municipal law)
CH-GR	communes	according to the law of the commune	according to the law of the commune (in practice between 15 and 21 members)	4 years		Gemeindegesetz (Municipal law)
CH-AG	210 communes in the canton of Argovie	Einwohnerrat	minimum 30 members maximum 80 members	4 years		Gemeindegesetz (Municipal law)
CH-TG	80 communes in the canton of Thurgovie	according to the law of the commune	minimum 20 members	according to the law of the commune		Gemeindegesetz (Municipal law)
CH-TI	112 communes in the canton of Tessin	Consiglio comunale	minimum 15 or 30 members (depending on the population of the commune)	4 years		Legge organica comunale
CH-VD	309 communes in the canton of Vaud	Conseil général (not elected, up to 1000 inhabitants) or conseil communal (elected)	minimum 25 members maximum 100 members	5 years		Loi sur les communes
CH-VS	126 communes in the canton of Valais	Conseil général	minimum 20 members maximum 60 members	4 years		Loi sur les communes
CH-NE	31 communes in the canton of Neuchâtel	Conseil général	according to the law of the commune	4 years		Loi sur les communes
CH-GE	45 communes in the canton of Genève	Conseil municipal	depends on the population of the commune (by decree of the Council of State of Geneva)	5 years		Loi sur l'administration des communes
CH-JU	53 communes in the canton of Jura	Conseil général	bgcolor="#edd9ff"	minimum 21 members	according to the law of the commune	Loi sur les communes

Legend:

according to the law of the commune
mixture of cantonal and communal law (in general governed by the canton, implemented by the commune)
by default, determined by the law of the canton droit cantonal, modifiable by the commune (implementing an exception)
strictly determined by the law of the canton (No derogation by the law of the commune)

The Canton of Neuchâtel does not have communal assemblies. Its legislature, the Grand Council of Neuchâtel, has 115 seats distributed in proportion to the population of the six electoral constituencies:

- Neuchâtel (35 seats)
- Boudry (25)
- Val-de-Travers (8)
- Val-de-Ruz (10)
- Le Locle (10)
- La Chaux-de-Fonds (27).

The enabling legislation of the cantons does require communes to have a conseil général with legislative powers, of 15 to 41 members, based on the size of the commune.

== See also ==
- Local council
- Municipalities of Switzerland
- Gemeindeparlament
- Kommunalrecht (Deutschland)
