= Rageth Abys =

Swiss politician, merchant, and soldier

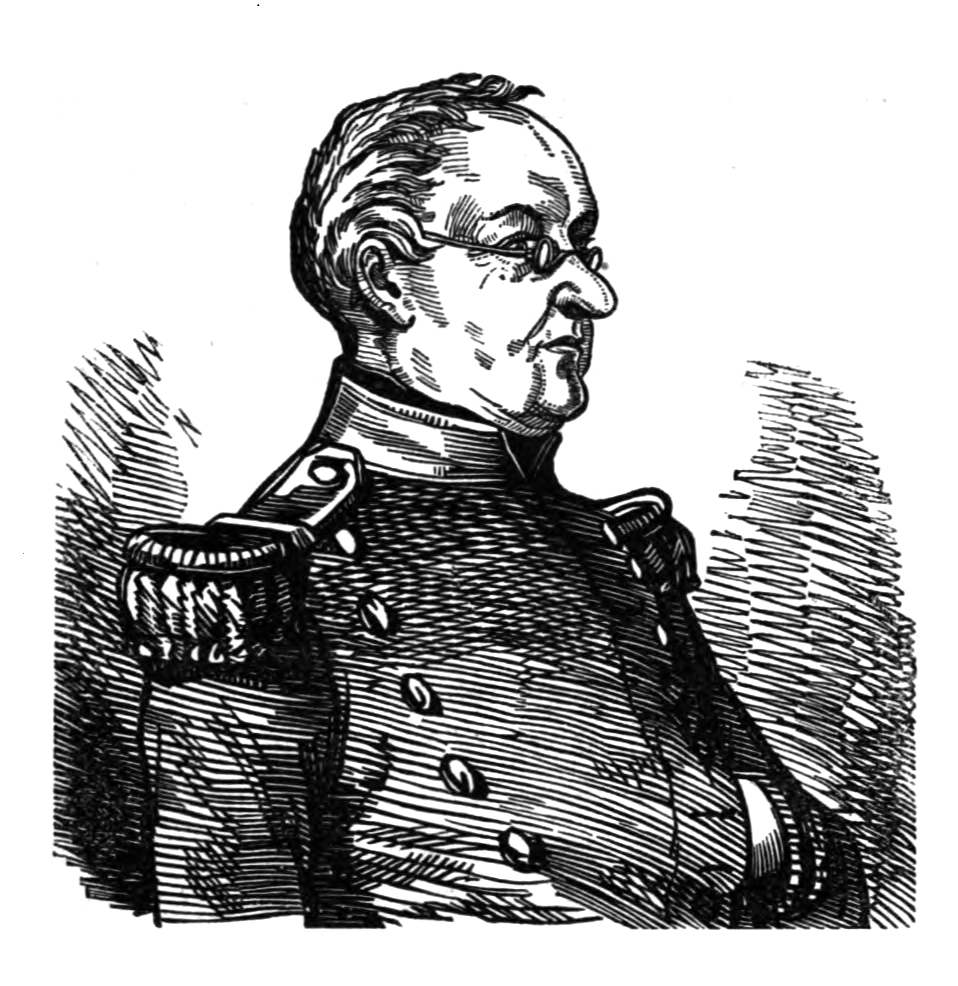
Rageth Abys

Rageth Abys (1790–1861) was a Swiss politician, merchant, and soldier.

He served as the mayor of Chur from 1834 to 1839 and 1843 to 1846, and 1847 to 1848. He also served as a city councilor from 1846 to 1848 and as deputy minister in 1847. In 1847, he served as Liberal Grand-Adviser to the Swiss Federal Diet in 1847.

His military record begins with him serving as quartermaster in the Royal Netherlands Swiss Regiment (1815–1822) then as a colonel in the Swiss Federal Office for the War (1826–1831, 1847), and finally as Swiss Federal War Commissar (1847–1861). He wrote about his service during the Sonderbund War in a memoir entitled "Erinnerungen aus dem Dienste der Kriegsverwaltung bei der eidgenössischen Armee in Feldzuge gegen den Sonderbund" ("Memories from the service of the war administration at the federal army in Feldzuge against the Sonderbund").

After the Sonderbund War he reported to the Swiss Federal Directory that the cost of the war was 4,876,582 Swiss Francs.
