= Johann Ulrich von Salis-Soglio =

Swiss military commander (1790–1874)

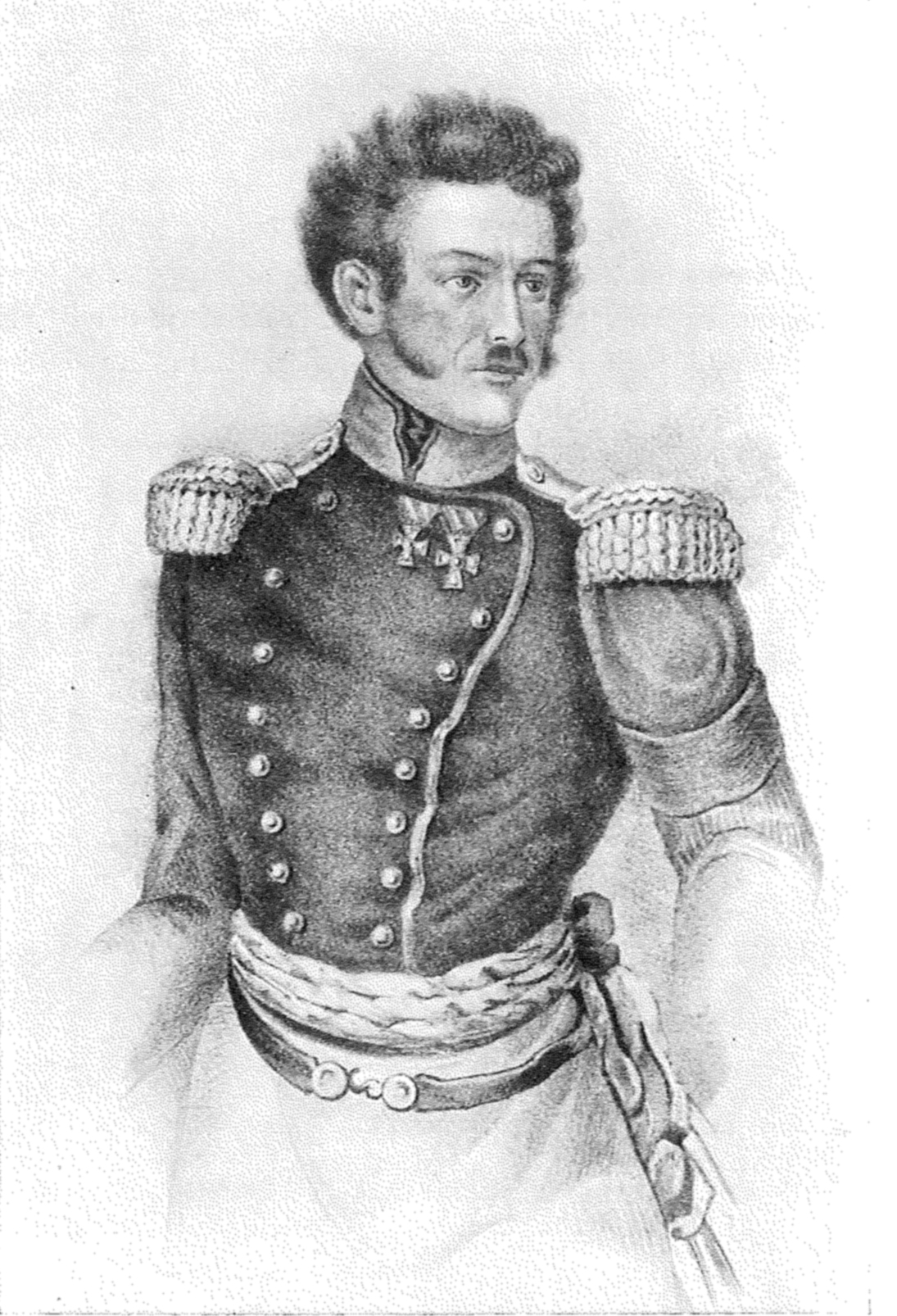
- 19th-century portrait of Johann Ulrich von Salis-Soglio
- Born: 16 March 1790; Chur, Switzerland
- Died: 27 April 1874 (aged 84); Chur, Switzerland
- Military career
- Allegiance: United Kingdom of the Netherlands; Swiss Confederation; Sonderbund
- Branch: Army
- Service years: c. 1809-1847
- Rank: Major-General; Colonel; Commander-in-Chief
- Commands: Army of the Sonderbund
- Conflicts: Napoleonic Wars; War of the Sixth Coalition; Sonderbund War

Johann Ulrich von Salis-Soglio (16 March 1790 – 27 April 1874) was a Swiss military officer who in 1847 commanded the conservative Sonderbund alliance in the Sonderbund War.

== Career ==
Salis-Soglio was born in Chur on 16 March 1790 to the Salis-Soglio noble family. He was the son of Katharina von Salis-Seewis and Daniel Salis-Soglio, an influential local politician and later delegate to the Congress of Vienna. Salis-Soglio chose a military career at a young age and became a member of the Grisons Militia in 1809. He served as a mercenary in Bavarian service between 1812 and 1815, fighting in the War of the Sixth Coalition, and in Dutch service between 1815 and 1839, reaching the rank of major-general in the Dutch Army.

Salis-Soglio returned to Switzerland in 1839 and joined the general staff of the Swiss Army with the rank of colonel in 1841. In August 1847, he was dismissed from his army position due to his support for the Sonderbund alliance. A Protestant, Salis-Soglio reluctantly took command of the Sonderbund army in October 1847. The Sonderbund, politically divided and with an inferior army, was defeated by the Federal army under General Dufour in the Sonderbund War. Salis-Soglio was accused of high treason, but was not put on trial due to the prioritization of national reconciliation.

After the war, Salis-Soglio lived in Bergamo, South Tyrol, and Munich, before retiring to Chur in 1855. He died in Chur on 27 April 1874, aged 84.
