= Julie Bondeli =

Swiss salonnière (1731–1778)

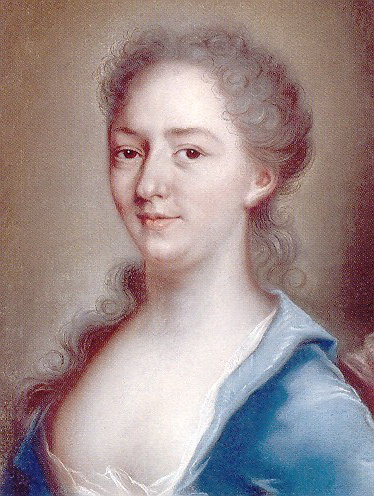
- Portrait of Bondeli, c. 1760
- Born: Susanna Julie von Bondeli; 24 December 1731; Bern, Switzerland
- Died: 8 August 1778 (aged 46); Neuchâtel, Switzerland
- Occupations: salonnière, noblewoman

Susanna Julie von Bondeli (born 24 December 1731; baptised 1 January 1732 – died 8 August 1778), was a famous Swiss salonnière and lady of letters. She hosted a salon which became the center of intellectual life in Bern.

== Life ==
The daughter of Friedrich and Julie Bondeli, young Susanna (who later dropped her forename) received an atypically comprehensive education in languages, mathematics and philosophy for a girl given the social mores of the time in which she lived. One of her teachers may have been the radical Samuel Henzi, who was executed in 1749 as principal organizer of a conspiracy to overturn Bern's patrician government.

She never married, but in 1752 began hosting a scientific salon in Bern which would become, a decade later, a centre of the city's cultural life. Luminaries with whom she enjoyed relationships included Johann Georg Zimmermann, Christoph Martin Wieland and Jean-Jacques Rousseau. Bondeli and Christoph Martin Wieland was engaged for a time, but never wed. Bondeli was also a correspondent of Jean-Jacques Rousseau from 1762 forward, as well as with Johann Georg Zimmermann, Sophie von La Roche, and Johann Kaspar Lavater.

== Sources ==
- Julie Bondeli, 1732–1778, Briefe. 4 Bände (eds. Angelica Baum, Birgit Christensen), Chronos Verlag, 2012; ISBN 3034010834/ISBN 9783034010832
- Eduard Bodemann, Julie Von Bondeli Und Ihr Freundeskreis, Ulan Press, 20 September 2012; ASIN: B009LI2QZO (in German)
