= Communal assembly =

In Switzerland, the communal assembly (German: Gemeindeversammlung) is a form of direct-democratic legislature, in which every eligible citizen of the commune may attend and vote, rather than being represented by elected councillors. It is used in many Swiss communes, particularly smaller ones. In larger communes, the legislative function is instead exercised by an elected communal parliament. The institution has roots in the medieval period, when communal assemblies served as the supreme bodies of Swiss communes from the Middle Ages through the Ancien Régime.

The communal assembly is known by different names across Switzerland's language regions and cantons. In German-speaking Switzerland, the term Gemeindeversammlung covers both the historical and modern institution. In French-speaking cantons, the modern institution is called assemblée communale in Bern and Fribourg, and assemblée primaire in Valais. In older French usage, it was called assemblée des communiers. In the canton of Vaud, communes with fewer than 1000 inhabitants generally use a conseil général—a deliberative body composed of citizens who formally join it—while larger communes use an elected conseil communal.

The decision between an assembly and an elected parliament generally depends on the size of the commune.

== History ==
Communal assemblies emerged during the formation of communes in the High Middle Ages and served as the supreme body of the commune under the Ancien Régime. Anyone holding full burgher rights (citizenship) in a rural or urban commune was entitled and required to attend. Depending on the type of commune, this meant the heads of households and, in part, widows, or—in large rural communes and valley communities (Talschaft)—all men capable of bearing arms from the age of 14 or 16. The assemblies were held annually at fixed dates, or on an extraordinary basis, under the linden tree, in the churchyard, and later in the communal hall, town hall, or inn; in many places they ended with a round of drinks at the tavern. The lord had to be informed of the place, date, and agenda of the assembly.

The communal assemblies decided their business, usually by majority vote: finances, the allocation of taxes, admission of new burghers, the appointment of officials, and the election of the burgomaster or Ammann (often jointly with the lord). They also heard the reading and renewal of ordinances and statutes (local customs, town charters), issued prohibitions and orders along with fines for their breach within the framework of field and civil jurisdiction, organized agriculture, communal labor, and the trades, and handled the commune's external representation, including lawsuits and petitions.

The autonomy of the communal assemblies reached its greatest extent between the 14th and 16th centuries, and was gradually curtailed thereafter. The creation of committees and the oligarchization of the councils tended to reduce the role of many urban assemblies to little more than the swearing of the burgher oath (Basel, Fribourg, Geneva, Lucerne, Zürich), and in some cases led to their disappearance altogether (Bern in the 15th century). The reintroduction or strengthening of the assemblies thus became a standard demand in urban revolts. In the subject lands of the city cantons and other territorial lords, rural assemblies came increasingly under sovereign control and lost their powers in lower justice. In the rural cantons (Länderorte), the Zenden of Valais, and the jurisdictional communes (Gerichtsgemeinden) of the Three Leagues, by contrast, the assemblies retained their autonomy until 1798.

The Helvetic Republic (1798–1803) reduced the general assemblies to electoral bodies whose only function was to appoint the municipalities. The Act of Mediation of 1803 then restored the communal assemblies as governing bodies of the communes.

== Bibliography ==
- K. S. Bader, Studien zur Rechtsgeschichte des mittelalterlichen Dorfes, vol. 2, 1962.
- L. Carlen, Rechtsgeschichte der Schweiz, 1968 (3rd ed. 1988).
- P. Blickle (ed.), Landgemeinde und Stadtgemeinde in Mitteleuropa, 1991, pp. 5–38, 169–190, 191–261.

== Archaic: France ==
Immediately after the French Revolution and the overthrow of the monarchy and the Ancien Régime, the Legislative Assembly decreed on August 10, 1792, a convocation of electors to elect a national legislature. Another decree, on August 12, mandated assemblées primaires to select the electors, thereby in effect implementing universal male suffrage.

== See also ==
- Insurrection of 10 August 1792
- Landsgemeinde

== Bibliography ==
- Ladner, Andreas (2016). Gemeindeversammlung und Gemeindeparlament: Überlegungen und empirische Befunde zur Ausgestaltung der Legislativfunktion in den Schweizer Gemeinden [Municipal parliament: considerations and empirical findings on the design of the legislative function in the Swiss municipalities] (in German). Institut de hautes études en administration publique (IDHEAP). p. 115. ISBN 978-2-940390-79-3. OCLC 952069714..
