= Secularization of Church property in Switzerland =

Confiscation of Church property in Switzerland

Secularization of Church property in Switzerland refers to the withdrawal by the state of rights of sovereignty, possession, and use held by religious institutions, without their consent. The term has been used in this sense since the mid-18th century. Earlier, "secularization" referred only to the passage of a member of a religious order to secular life; in the 20th century, it also came to denote the secularization of society more broadly.

A distinction is drawn between secularization of public law (by the territorial authority), secularization under property law (private law), and the suppression of a religious institution. In Switzerland, secularization affected only the Catholic Church, particularly the dioceses and monasteries. It took place in two phases: the first in the 16th century in the wake of the Reformation, the second between 1770 and 1870 under the influence of Enlightenment ideas, liberalism, and radicalism. Although it resulted in the largest transfer of property in Swiss history, no comprehensive study of the subject has yet been produced.

== 16th-century secularization ==
The secularization of Church property was among the most far-reaching political, economic, and cultural consequences of the Reformation, and an integral part of the new Protestant understanding of relations between Church and state. The Reformers justified what amounted to a violation of law and a large-scale expropriation on biblical grounds, arguing that monasticism lacked scriptural foundation and that ecclesiastical property should serve the poor and the preaching of the Gospel. Secularization brought a radical end to the late medieval tendencies toward fusion of Church and state, such as wardships and incorporations.

A few priors, abbots, and provosts who had adopted the new faith voluntarily handed over their houses to the urban authorities as early as 1524 (Sankt Peter in Embrach, the Fraumünster in Zürich). Following political decisions in favor of the Reformation, the cantons and allied territories of the Confederacy then took over the property of monasteries, chapters, and churches throughout their territories. In the case of St. Gallen, the princely abbey that the town had secularized in 1529 was restored in 1532 following the Second War of Kappel. During the Bündner Wirren, Austrian pressure helped Catholic claims for restitution achieve some success in the Grisons.

The property affected by secularization included rights of lordship and patronage, feudal dues, real estate, movables, and liturgical objects—the latter being melted down as coinage metal. Monastic and conventual churches, pilgrimage churches, and parish churches and chapels that had become superfluous were either demolished or converted to secular use as schools, granaries, hospitals, or farm buildings; the abbey church of Payerne was preserved from demolition in this way. The occupants of the monasteries were forced to leave. Compensated by a one-time payment or a life annuity, they were invited to take up studies or learn a trade, while older religious were permitted to remain in the convent until their death. Peasants continued to owe feudal dues, the tithe in particular weighing heavily on the finances of the cantons. The abolition of the ecclesiastical lordships of monasteries (such as Allerheiligen in Schaffhausen and St. Victor in Geneva) and of bishoprics also altered the balance of power within the Confederacy. The dioceses survived as institutions of the Catholic Church, but their temporal holdings were either suppressed outright (Geneva, Lausanne) or seriously curtailed (Chur, Basel, Constance).

The cantons took different approaches to the seizure and administration of secularized property. Bern gave the confiscation the appearance of a legal transaction and bought out the religious houses from their priors or abbots, thereby securing a legitimate claim to monastic revenues collected outside the territory of the Republic. It sold a few smaller ecclesiastical lordships to members of the Council and turned the larger ones into Vogtei. In Basel, the administration of the monasteries was entrusted to a special body, the Deputatenamt, which preserved their status as civil-law institutions and allowed claims to be made on the dues owed to them in regions that had remained Catholic. In Zurich, where the Grossmünster chapter had been able to survive as a collegiate chapter and an economic unit thanks to the reform of 1523, the Council placed each suppressed monastery under the administration of a city Amtmann, and in 1533 created the office of director of monasteries (Obmann gemeiner Klöster) for their overall supervision. As early as 1525, the Council had also set up an office of poor relief and assigned monastic revenues to it.

The Reformers and dignitaries of the Reformed Church insisted that the secularized property be used for ecclesiastical and charitable purposes (Church service, poor relief, care of the sick, schools), although the authorities sometimes used these revenues for secular ends. Research on the subject was not entirely free from confessional polemic until the 20th century. To the accusation that they had unlawfully enriched themselves, the Reformed side replied that secularization had restored the original Christian purpose of ecclesiastical property and had brought no profit to the authorities of the Protestant cantons.

== Secularization from 1770 to 1870 ==
Strengthened by the consolidation of the Church through the Catholic Reform and Counter-Reformation, dioceses and monasteries experienced a new period of prosperity in the 17th and 18th centuries. From the mid-18th century onward, however, supporters of the Enlightenment began to question the temporal power of bishops and abbots, and the very existence of monasteries. In 1769, an anonymous pamphlet by Johann Heinrich Heidegger, a member of the Zurich Council, called for the suppression of half of the Swiss monasteries, opening a wave of publications that, with the support of Reform Catholicism, would direct their attacks against religious institutions for more than a century. The first secularizations followed the suppression of the Jesuit order in 1773, when the Catholic cantons confiscated the colleges for the state. The entry of French troops into the bishopric of Basel in 1792 led to the secularization and partial demolition of the monasteries of Porrentruy and Delémont, as was also the case in 1797 for the Premonstratensian abbey of Bellelay. In 1798, the Helvetic Revolution stripped religious institutions of all their seigneurial rights and most of their possessions at a single stroke, and brought about the disappearance of all ecclesiastical states (St. Gall, Engelberg, Chur, Constance). Several measures taken by the Helvetic Republic threatened the monasteries, notably the decree of 17 September 1798 which, following the French model, declared all conventual property to be national property. The Reichsdeputationshauptschluss of 1803 likewise entailed the secularization of the rights and property of Swiss prelates in the Empire and of imperial prelates in Switzerland. In some cases the ownership of secularized property was settled only after decades of litigation, notably with the Grand Duchy of Baden over the possessions of the prince-bishopric of Constance and certain monasteries, and with Austria over the prince-bishopric of Chur (the Inkamerationsstreit).

The Act of Mediation of 1803 and the Federal Pact of 1815 guaranteed the right of monasteries to exist and to hold property. Secularization nevertheless continued in some cantons: St. Gallen suppressed the abbey in its capital in 1805, and then the chapter of noble canonesses of Schänis in 1811. The advance of the liberal movement after 1830 unleashed a new wave of secularizations, in which liberal Catholics often played a leading role. The canton of St. Gallen secularized Pfäfers Abbey in 1838, and Aargau its eight monasteries in 1841; in the latter case, however, the Tagsatzung obtained the restoration of the four women's convents (the Aargau Monastery Dispute). The conflict over monasteries and religious orders, and the Jesuits in particular, was one of the central points of contention in Switzerland in the 1830s and 1840s, leading to the Sonderbund and, in 1847, to the civil war. After the liberal victory, several cantons secularized their monasteries: Lucerne, Thurgau, Ticino, and Fribourg in 1848, Ticino again in 1852 (five colleges), and Zurich in 1861 (Rheinau). A few further secularizations took place during the Kulturkampf, in Aargau in 1870 and finally in the canton of Solothurn in 1875. The greater part of the secularized property passed into the cantonal treasuries, and most of the buildings were converted into schools and clinics, particularly psychiatric hospitals.

Under the Special Provisions of the Federal Constitution of 1874, the liberal federal state prevented the re-establishment of the secularized monasteries until their repeal in 1973.

== Bibliography ==
=== General ===
- Helvetia Sacra.
- Theologische Realenzyklopädie, vol. 29, pp. 597–602.
- Religion in Geschichte und Gegenwart, vol. 7, 3rd ed. 2004, pp. 1280–1288.

=== 16th century ===
- E. Rübel, "Die Aufhebung der Klöster im Kanton Zürich und die Verwendung ihrer Güter", in Zürcher Taschenbuch 2000, 1999, pp. 51–88.
- J. Schweizer, "Säkularisation", in Berns mächtige Zeit, ed. A. Holenstein et al., 2006, pp. 173–178.
- C. Mottier, "Sécularisation, gestion et dévolution des biens ecclésiastiques par Berne, à l'exemple de ses bailliages limitrophes de Genève (1536–1567)", in Les registres du Conseil de la République de Genève sous l'Ancien Régime, 2009, pp. 195–209.

=== 1770–1870 ===
- M. Jorio, Der Untergang des Fürstbistums Basel (1792–1815), 1982.
- F. X. Bischof, Das Ende des Bistums Konstanz, 1989.
- H. Wicki, Staat, Kirche, Religiosität, 1990.
- M. Piceni et al., La soppressione dei conventi nel Cantone Ticino, 1995.
- Ceschi, Ticino, pp. 113–134.
- Fürstabtei St. Gallen: Untergang und Erbe 1805/2005, 2005.
- A. Holenstein, "Die Säkularisation als Problem der Schweizer Geschichte des 18. und 19. Jahrhunderts", in Die Säkularisation im Prozess der Säkularisierung Europas, ed. P. Blickle, R. Schlögl, 2005, pp. 317–337.
