= Sonderbund War =

1847 civil war in Switzerland

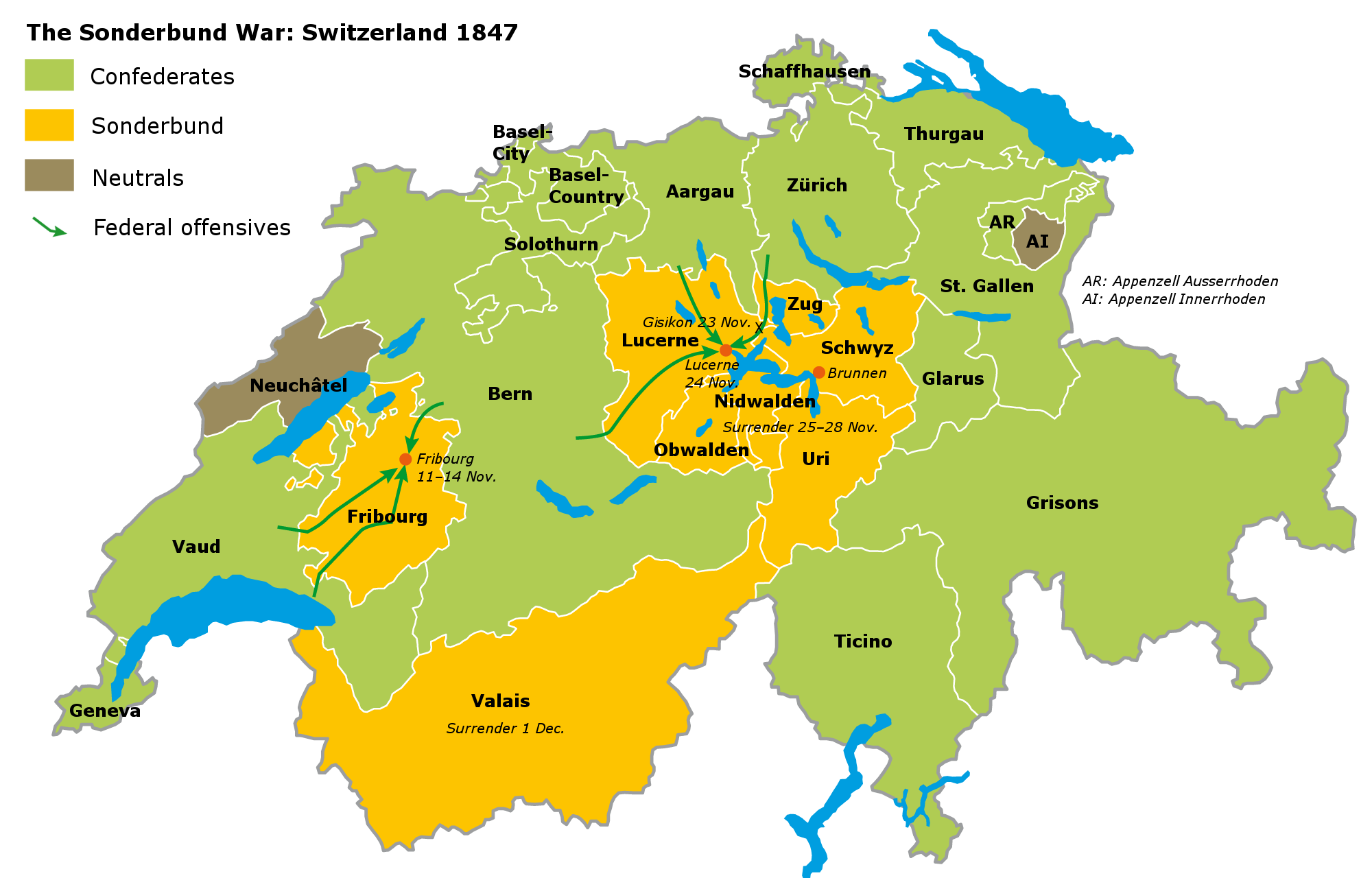
- Confederates; Sonderbund; Neutrals
Date	3–29 November 1847 (3 weeks and 5 days)
Location	Switzerland
Result	Confederate victory: Dissolution of the Sonderbund; Federal constitution of 1848

Belligerents
Swiss Confederation: Aargau; (Appenzell Ausserrhoden) Appenzell AR; Basel-Landschaft; Basel-Stadt; Bern; Geneva; Glarus; Graubünden; Schaffhausen; St. Gallen; Solothurn; Thurgau; Ticino; Vaud; Zürich	Sonderbund: Fribourg; Lucerne; Nidwalden; Obwalden; Schwyz; Uri; Valais; Zug

Commanders and leaders
(Canton of Geneva) Guillaume Henri Dufour	(Canton of Lucerne) Johann Ulrich von Salis-Soglio

Strength
99,000	79,000

Casualties and losses
60 / 78 dead; 386 / 260 wounded	33 dead; 124 wounded

The Sonderbund War (German: Sonderbundskrieg, French: Guerre du Sonderbund, Italian: Guerra del Sonderbund) of November 1847 was a civil war in Switzerland, then still a relatively loose confederacy of cantons. It ensued after seven Catholic cantons formed the Sonderbund ("separate alliance") in 1845 to protect their interests against a centralization of power. The war concluded with the defeat of the Sonderbund. It resulted in the emergence of Switzerland as a federal state, concluding the period of political "restoration and regeneration" in Switzerland.

The Sonderbund consisted of the cantons of Lucerne, Fribourg, Valais, Uri, Schwyz, Unterwalden and Zug, all predominantly Catholic and governed by conservative administrations. The cantons of Ticino and Solothurn, also predominantly Catholic but governed by liberal administrations, did not join the alliance.

After the Tagsatzung (Federal Diet) declared the Sonderbund unconstitutional (October 1847) and ordered it dissolved by force, General Guillaume Henri Dufour led the federal army of 100,000 and defeated the Sonderbund forces under Johann Ulrich von Salis-Soglio in a campaign that lasted only a few weeks, from November 3 to November 29, and cost about 100 lives. Dufour ordered his troops to care for the injured, foreshadowing the formation of the Red Cross, in which he participated a few years later. Major actions were fought at Fribourg, Geltwil (12 November), Lunnern, Lucerne, and finally at Gisikon (23 November), Meierskappel, and Schüpfheim, after which Lucerne capitulated on 24 November. The rest of the Sonderbund surrendered without armed resistance in the subsequent weeks.

== Background ==
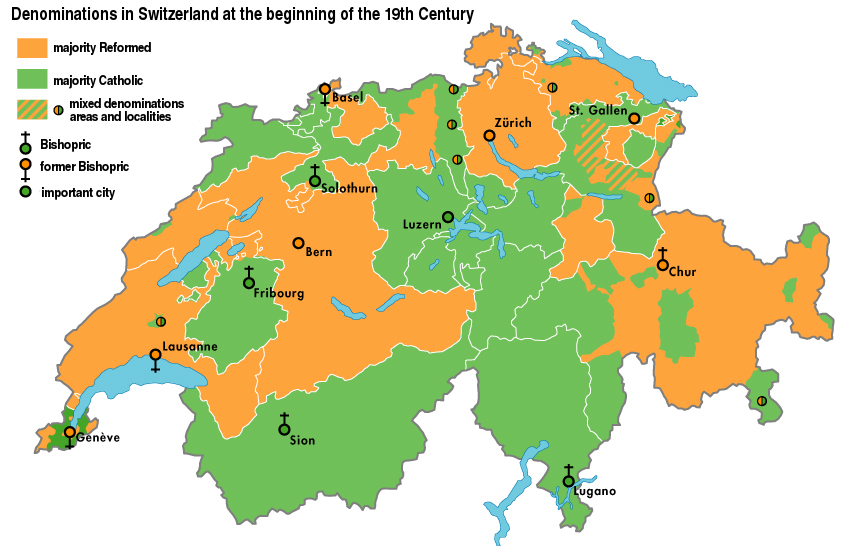
Distribution of confessions at the start of the 19th century: Majority Protestant; Majority Catholic

The radical (progressive liberal) Free Democratic Party of Switzerland (German: Freisinnig-Demokratische Partei, French: Parti radical-démocratique), which was mainly made up of urban bourgeoisie and burghers and was strong in the largely Protestant cantons, obtained the majority in the Federal Diet (the Tagsatzung) in the early 1840s. It proposed a new Constitution for the Swiss Confederation which would draw the several cantons into a closer relationship. In addition to the centralization of the Swiss government, the proposed new Constitution also included protections for trade and other progressive reform measures. The conservative city patricians and mountain or Ur-Swiss from the largely Catholic cantons opposed the new constitution in 1843 and combined to form the Sonderbund in 1845.

The Sonderbund alliance was concluded after the Federal Diet, with the approval of a majority of cantons, had taken measures against the Catholic Church such as the closure of monasteries and convents in Aargau in 1841, and the seizure of their properties. When Lucerne, in retaliation, recalled the Jesuits to head its education the same year, groups of armed radicals (Freischärler) invaded the canton. This caused a revolt, mostly because rural cantons were strongholds of ultramontanism.

The liberal majority in the Tagsatzung voted to order the Sonderbund dissolved on October 21, 1847; it deemed the Sonderbund a violation of section 6 of the Federal Treaty of 1815, which expressly forbade such separate alliances. The confederate army was raised against the members of the Sonderbund. The army was composed of soldiers of all the other cantons except Neuchâtel and Appenzell Innerrhoden (which remained neutral).

By the Treaty of Vienna of 1815, the major powers guaranteed the new Swiss Constitution and had a right to intervene if they all agreed it was necessary. At this point, Austria and France were conservative Catholic powers and wanted to help the Swiss conservatives. Austria did provide some money and munitions, but bickered with France on exactly what to do. When they finally did agree, Lord Palmerston, Prime Minister of Britain, refused to support it, because he supported the liberal cause and wanted the Jesuits expelled. Since the powers could not agree on collective action, no intervention took place.

== Conflict ==
=== Preparations for war ===
==== Sonderbund forces ====
The question of command remained long unsettled with the Sonderbund. The coalition's strong man, Constantin Siegwart-Müller of Lucerne, first considered appointing a foreigner (Dezydery Chłapowski of Poland or Friedrich von Schwarzenberg of Austria were mentioned), but the allied council insisted on a Swiss commander. General Ludwig von Sonnenberg and Colonel Philippe de Maillardoz of Fribourg were considered, but ultimately the council elected Guillaume de Kalbermatten of Valais. After Kalbermatten declined the appointment (he would later command the troops of Valais), Colonel Jean-Ulrich de Salis-Soglio of Grisons was elected and sworn in as commander in chief on 15 January 1847. He appointed Franz von Elgger as chief of staff. Although a Protestant himself, Salis-Soglio was a staunch Conservative and an opponent of the liberal Radicals who now controlled the "rump Confederation".

The Sonderbund cantons, except for Lucerne and Fribourg, sought and obtained the assent of their popular assemblies (Landsgemeinden) for general conscription. These votes occurred on September 26 (Schwyz), October 3 (Uri and Zug) and October 10 (Nidwalden, Obwalden and Valais). Troop mobilisation began on October 16 and was concluded on October 19.

Also in October, several fortifications were built on Sonderbund territory, notably in Valais, where Kalbermatten's forces were massed by the end of October between Saint-Maurice and Saint-Gingolph, with a view of invading the Chablais of Vaud.

==== Federal army ====
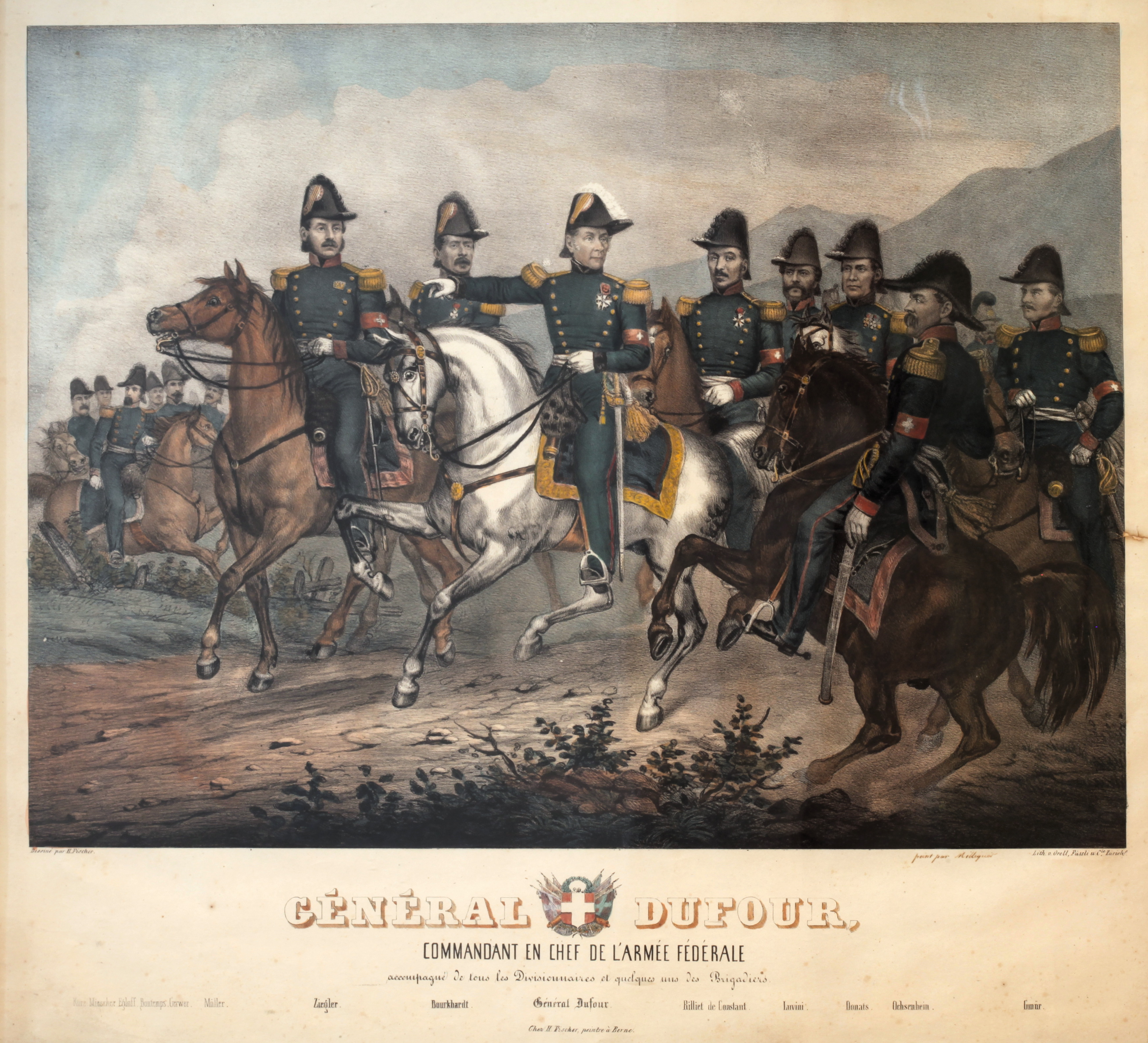
The general staff of the federal army: Kurz, Minscher, Enloff, Bontemps, Gerwer, Müller, Ziegler, Bourkhardt, Dufour, Rilliet de Constant, Luvini, Donats, Ochsenbein and Gmür

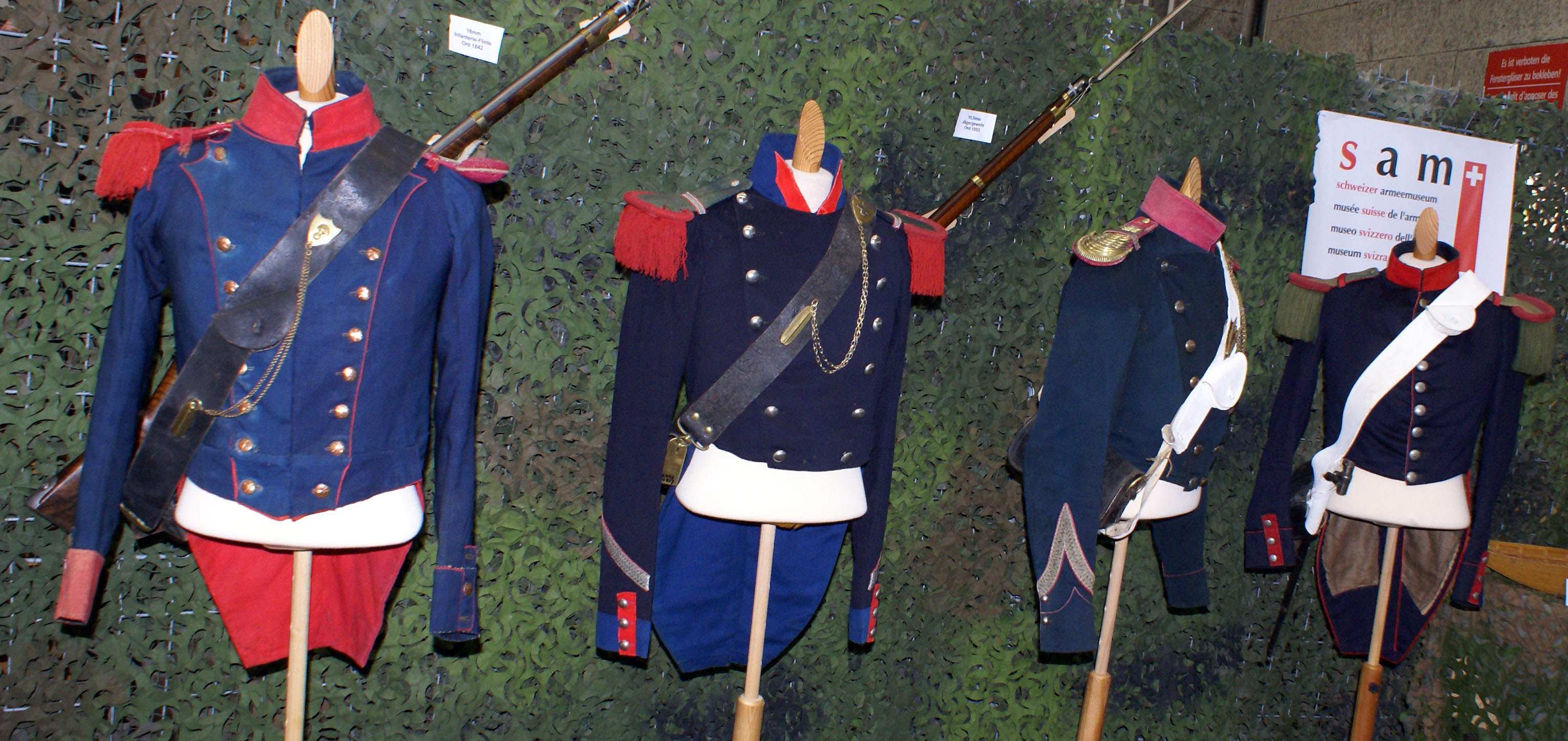
Swiss Army uniforms of the Sonderbund War

On 21 October 1847, the Federal Diet elected General Guillaume Henri Dufour of Geneva as commander in chief of the federal army, despite his reluctance and the efforts of the Bernese government to appoint Ulrich Ochsenbein to this post. In his letter of acceptance to the Diet of October 22, Dufour emphasized that he would "do everything in order to alleviate the inevitable evils of war".

On October 24, immediately prior to taking the oath of office, Dufour requested explanations concerning his orders (which were written in German) and, after an impolitic remark by the representative of Vaud, Jules Eytel, he declined the office and left the meeting of the Diet. It took two sessions behind closed doors, and a delegation of the representatives of Geneva, to convince Dufour to reconsider and to be sworn in on 25 October.

After publishing a proclamation on October 26, Dufour appointed as division commanders: Peter Ludwig von Donatz (Grisons), Johannes Burckhardt and Eduard Ziegler (Zürich) from among the Conservatives and Louis Rilliet de Constant (Vaud), Dominik Gmür, Giacomo Luvini (Ticino) and Ochsenbein (Bern) from among the Radicals. On October 30, the Diet ordered the general mobilisation of the army and, on November 4, the military execution of its decree dissolving the Sonderbund.

==== Neutrals ====
The cantons of Neuchâtel and Appenzell Innerrhoden, both of which had a strong Catholic minority population, officially declared their neutrality in the conflict and refused to provide troops for the Confederation.

Vaud, in particular, suspected the Principality of Neuchâtel of secretly supporting the Sonderbund. Several incidents ensued, notably the capture of a lake steamship of Neuchâtel by troops from Vaud. On 29 October, Colonel Rillet-Constant asked Dufour's permission to march on Neuchâtel. The general refused, instead asking Rillet-Constant to levy additional troops in order to make up for the defection of Neuchâtel. When the Federal Diet on October 30 formally requested Neuchâtel to supply its contingent of troops, the Principality refused. King Frederick William IV of Prussia, as Prince of Neuchâtel, eventually settled the issue by declaring the Principality "neutral and inviolate" during the hostilities.

The canton of Basel-Stadt resisted the requests of the Diet for a time, but ultimately provided its contingent of troops by November 6, two days after the opening of hostilities.

=== Sonderbund actions in Ticino and Aargau ===
The first actions were taken by the Sonderbund. Troops from Uri seized the undefended St. Gotthard Pass in the early days of November. They thereby succeeded in keeping the connection between central Switzerland and the Valais open via the Furka Pass. But contrary to triumphant proclamations in the Sonderbund newspapers, the action failed to effectively separate the federal troops under Luvini in the Ticino from those in the Grisons under Eduard de Salis-Soglio (the brother of the insurgent commander) because the San Bernardino Pass remained open to the Confederates. The first deaths of the war occurred on November 4, when an officer and a soldier from Uri were killed by the Ticinesi.

On November 7, Sonderbund forces under the direct command of Jean-Ulrich de Salis-Soglio and von Elgger prepared to launch a second offensive into the Freiamt region of Aargau. After destroying a bridge over the river Reuss, they entered Aargau on November 12 in order to split the federal forces into two and relieve Fribourg, which was surrounded by Confederate territory. However, after a few advances, they were stopped by Ziegler and retreated with losses into the canton of Lucerne.

=== Fribourg campaign ===
On 9 November, Dufour launched the first offensive against Fribourg, in accordance with his general plan. Dufour chose Fribourg as his first target in part because it was geographically isolated from the other rebel cantons and in part because it was close to Bern. The former factor made it easier to confront than the other members of the Sonderbund; the latter meant that it posed a threat to the Federal Diet if it was not neutralized immediately. Moreover, Fribourg's capture would allow Dufour to concentrate his forces in the center of the country.

By 10 and 11 November, federal troops seized the city of Estavayer-le-Lac, the enclaves of Fribourg in the canton of Vaud, and most of the district of Murten without resistance. The Fribourgeois troops under Colonel Philippe de Maillardoz retreated to defend the capital.

==== Siege and surrender of Fribourg ====
The Fribourgeois commander was led to anticipate an attack from the direction of Bern by the advance of a Bernese reserve division, which had been ordered to pretend to attack with a maximum of noise. Meanwhile, Dufour brought a battery of 60 guns into position, with which he intended to bring down the fortifications of the city of Fribourg.

On the morning of 13 November, with the assault ready to begin, Dufour sent a Vaudois lieutenant to Fribourg under a flag of truce. The emissary's message revealed Dufour's forces and plan of attack to the Fribourgeois government, and called on them to surrender in order to prevent a murderous battle. The besieged Fribourgeois asked for an armistice for the day, which Dufour accepted. But because of mistaken orders, the Vaudois troops facing the redoubt of Bertigny launched an attack against the fortress after a brief artillery exchange. They were repelled with eight dead and some fifty wounded; several defenders were also killed or wounded.

Nonetheless, on the morning of 14 November, two delegates of the governing Council of State of Fribourg brought Dufour the news of the canton's surrender, decided by majority vote. While Confederate Switzerland rejoiced at the news, the surrender was a bitter disappointment to the Fribourgeouis troops. Many accusations of treason were raised, notably against the commander, Colonel de Maillardoz, who had to flee into exile to Neuchâtel. While it was eventually shown that the surrender had been a decision of the civil government about which de Maillardoz had not even been consulted, he remained disgraced.

==== Aftermath of the Fribourg campaign ====
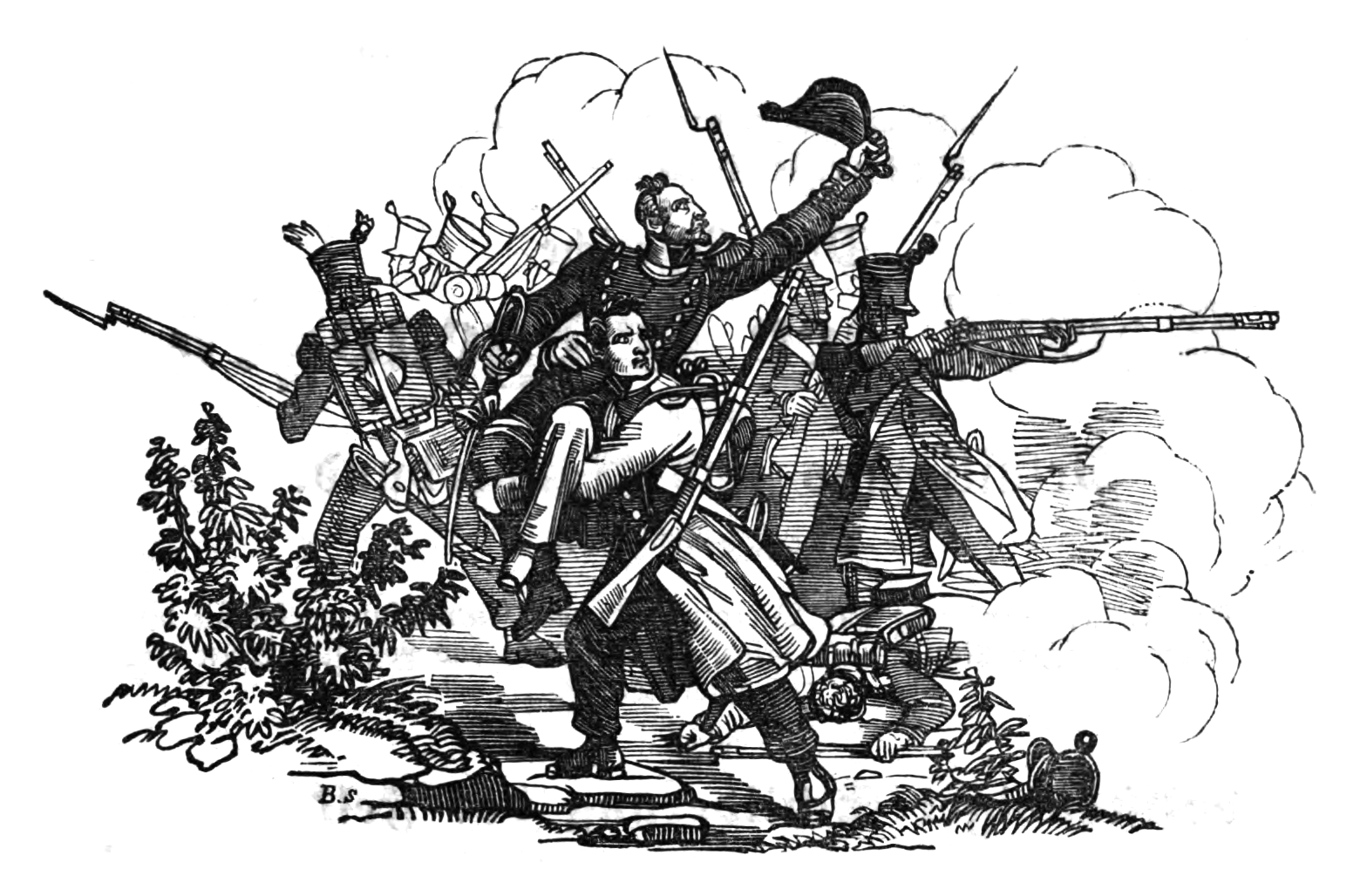
The battle of Airolo in Ticino

On the evening of 14 November, the government of Valais decided to launch an offensive against Vaud in response to Fribourg's call for help. But news of the capitulation came soon enough for the Valaisans to recall the troops and set them into motion for a manoeuvre against Ticino.

The act of surrender signed by Fribourg would become a template for the other Sonderbund cantons. With it, Fribourg undertook to leave the Sonderbund, to disarm its soldiers and to provide for the federal occupation troops. On 15 November, a new Fribourgeois government of a Radical bent was elected, who as its first act expelled the order of the Jesuits from the canton. The day after, the Vaudois commander, Colonel Rillet-Constant, had to declare a state of siege to prevent federal soldiers from pillaging and sacking the city, against the strict orders of their superiors.

On both sides of the war, the fall of Fribourg was commented on by the press and the political leaders. In Lucerne and Valais, proclamations were read to the troops, assuring them that this setback would have no effect on the coalition. Catholic newspapers doubted the news of the capitulation or claimed that the Valaisans had launched a victorious offensive into the Chablais. On the Federal side, public confidence and the morale of the army grew.

As soon as the new government was installed, Dufour left Fribourg for central Switzerland with his army. He left the western theatre of operations to Rillet-Constant, who was allowed to shift his headquarters to the Chablais, but was forbidden to take any unilateral action against Valais without Dufour's direct order. By 15 November, the federal forces passed through Bern and reached Aarau on the evening of the 16th.

On the morning of 17 November, the troops of Uri with some reinforcements from Nidwald advanced into Ticino towards Airolo, which fell, then the day after towards Faido and on the 21st towards Biasca, where they stopped to await reinforcements. But the first to be reinforced were the Ticinesi, who received the support of some battalions from the Grisons, which arrived on the 22nd.

=== Lucerne campaign ===
==== Preparations and the surrender of Zug ====
In Aarau, Dufour prepared his forces and his battle plan until November 20. He declined to equip his forces with Congreve rockets offered to him by the local arsenal, writing that he intended to "avoid as far as possible to give this war a violent character which cannot but harm our cause.". To the surprise of both sides, the parliament of the canton of Zug voted for surrender on 21 November by a large majority. The federal troops which entered the city of Zug unopposed the day after were acclaimed by the population, and a few months later, a new government would be elected.

Dufour launched his principal offensive according to plan on November 23: The 4th (Ziegler) and the 5th divisions (Gmür) followed the Reuss valley to the south, each on one side. They were supported by the 3rd division (von Donats) descending along the Suhr until Sursee, and by the 2nd division (Burckhardt), which left Langenthal to arrive at the Reuss north of Lucerne by way of Willisau and Ruswil. The reserve artillery was concentrated on the bridgehead of Gisikon, which set up the main battle between the left bank of the Reuss and the lake of Zug, with the Lucernese troops caught between five columns of troops arriving from five different directions.

==== Battle of Gisikon ====
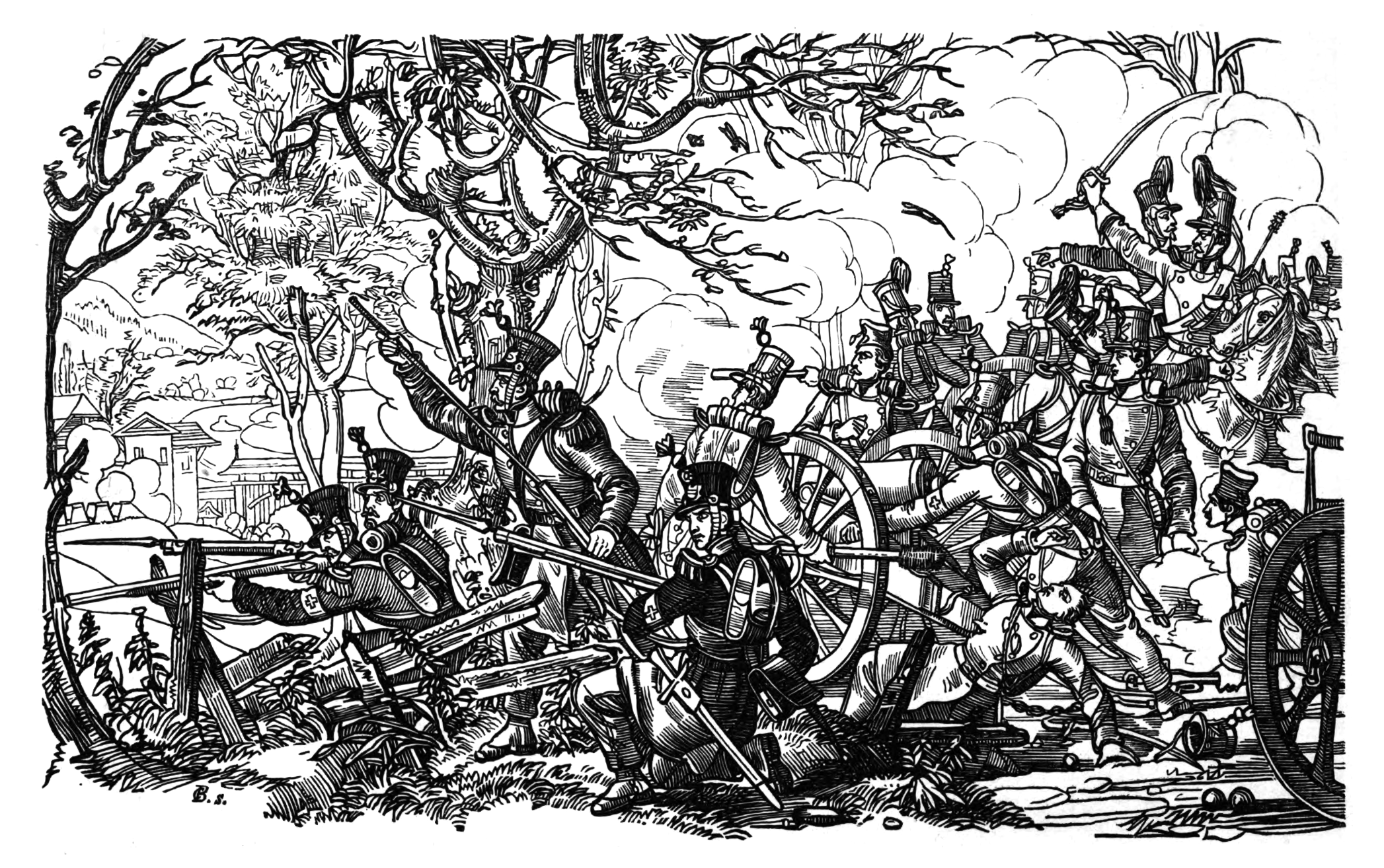
Rust's battery at the battle of Gisikon

Near Gisikon, the federal army constructed several pontoon bridges to cross the Reuss. At this point, the Sonderbund commander, von Salis-Soglio, had concentrated his troops on an elevation, well-hidden behind trees and underbrush. After two federal assaults on the Sonderbund position were repulsed, Colonel Ziegler personally led his division's third and victorious assault, later depicted in a lithograph that would become one of the war's most well-known images. After two hours, the battle resulted in a federal victory after von Salis-Soglio, wounded in the head by a mortar detonation, ordered a retreat to Ebikon.

"Thirty-seven men were killed and about 100 wounded. This was not just the longest and bloodiest of the war, but also the last pitched battle ever to be fought by the Swiss Army and the first in world history to see the use of purpose-designed ambulances, in the form of wagons operated by nurses and volunteers from Zürich, to treat the wounded on the battlefield."

==== Battle of Meierskappel ====
Also on November 23, while the 2nd and 3rd federal divisions proceeded without opposition to Lucerne, the 5th division engaged troops from Schwyz near Meierskappel. The Sonderbund forces resisted for a while before retreating. This federal victory cut the connection between Lucerne and Zug, another of Dufour's objectives. In his report to the Diet of November 23, Dufour wrote with satisfaction that the troops of Schwyz had withdrawn to the other side of Lake Zug and were now cut off from the rest of the Sonderbund army.

==== Surrender of Lucerne ====
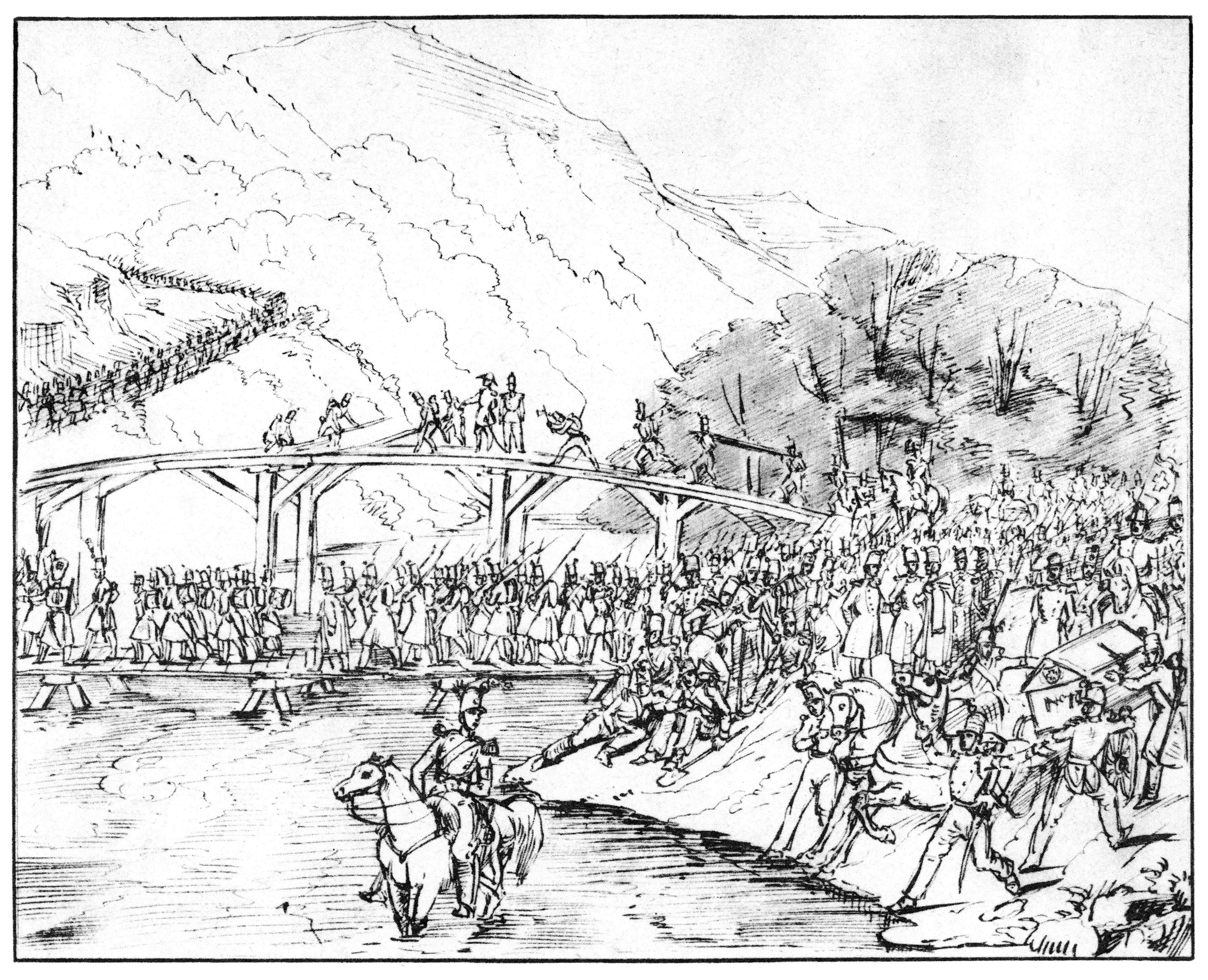
The 2nd Division crosses the Emme river into Littau.

The federal victories at Gisikon and Meierskappel brought federal troops within striking distance of Lucerne. On the evening of November 23, the leadership of Lucerne and the Jesuits abandoned the city and fled to Uri. On the following morning the victorious federal troops entered the city unopposed.

==== Surrender of the rest of Central Switzerland ====
On 26 November 1847, the Sonderbund council dissolved in Flüelen without a formal vote. Between 25–29 November federal troops moved peacefully into Central Switzerland and Valais. Unterwalden surrendered on November 25, followed by Schwyz on the following day and then Uri on November 27.

== End of war ==
The last member of the Sonderbund, Valais, surrendered on November 29, which brought the war to an end. The federal army had lost 78 men killed and had 260 wounded. Sonderbund losses were even lower. Later research arrived at 60 deaths and 386 wounded on the federal side and 33 killed and 124 wounded among the Sonderbund.

The Sonderbund governments were forced to resign and in Fribourg, Lucerne and Valais, the Liberals gained power. Neuchâtel and Appenzell Innerrhoden were punished for not providing troops to the federal army. Neuchâtel paid 300,000 francs and Appenzell 15,000 into a fund to support war widows and orphans. By February 1848, all federal troops had withdrawn from the occupied cantons.

In Schwyz, the conservative government was dissolved and a new provisional government and constitution established. The first attempt at a constitution, which split the district of Schwyz in two and moved the cantonal capital away from Schwyz, was narrowly defeated on 27 January 1848. The second constitution, which removed the mentioned points and merged the former districts of Wollerau and Pfäffikon in the district of March, was then approved by the electorate on 27 February 1848. The new constitution of 1848 reformed the government of the Canton. Perhaps the greatest change was that abolishing the Landsgemeinde, which had been the supreme authority. The government was split into three branches (legislature, executive and judiciary), a three-tier structure of municipalities (districts and canton) was created. Also, proportional representation started, and the population was allowed to vote on laws and constitutional amendments.

== Swiss Federal Constitution of 1848 ==
In 1848, a new Swiss Federal Constitution ended the almost complete independence of the cantons and transformed Switzerland into a federal state. The Jesuits were constitutionally banished from Switzerland. The Special Provision was lifted on 20 May 1973, when 54.9% of the population and 16.5 cantons out of 22 voted to approve modifying the Constitution.

== Military and political leaders ==
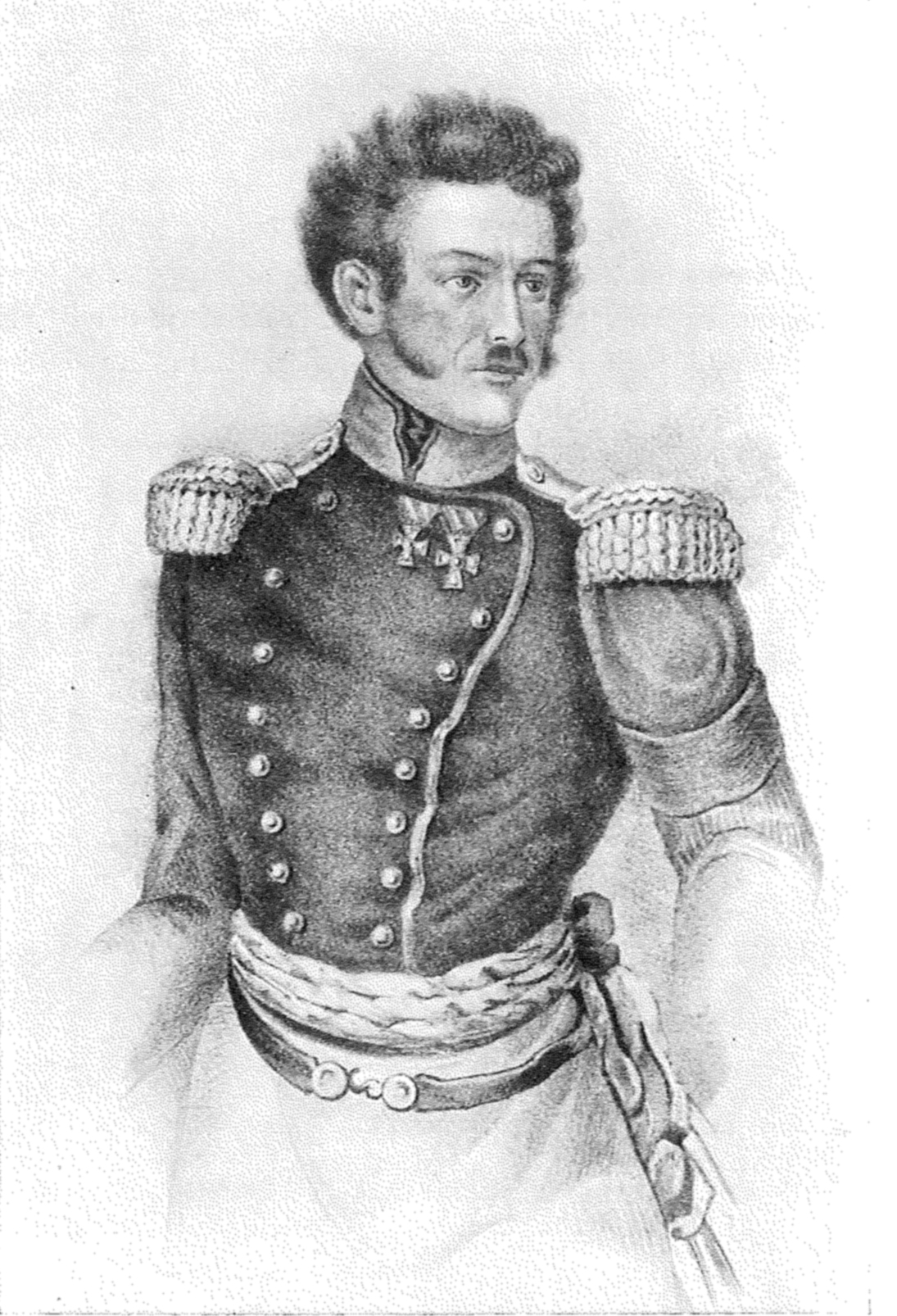
Jean-Ulrich de Salis-Soglio

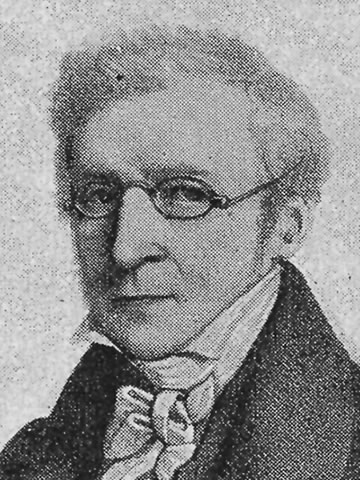
Josef Franz Karl Amrhyn

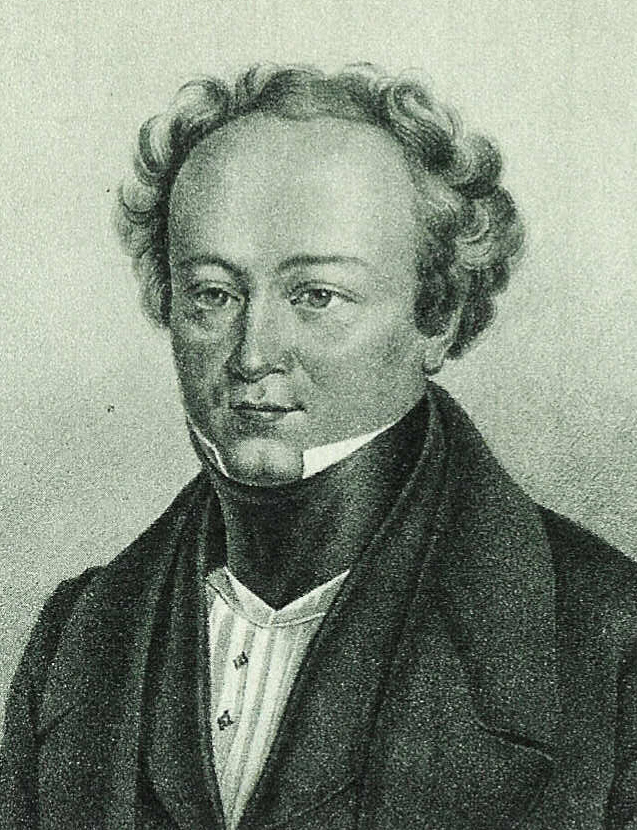
Charles Neuhaus

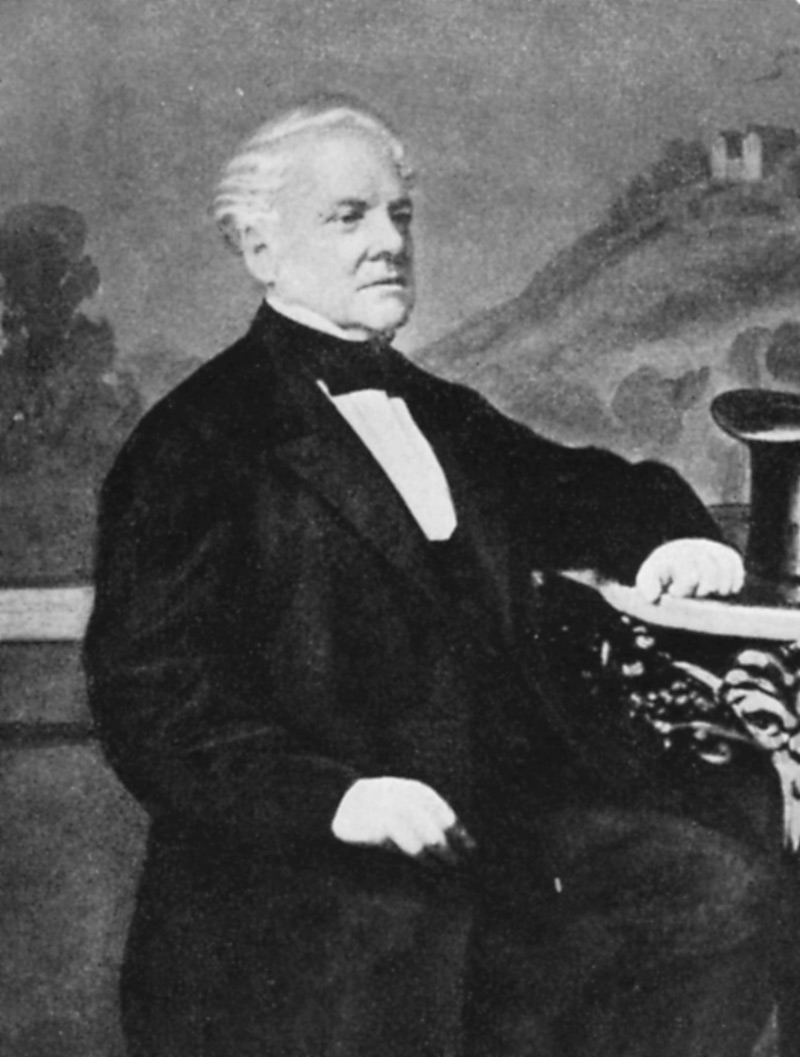
Heinrich Titot

Jean-Marc Mousson

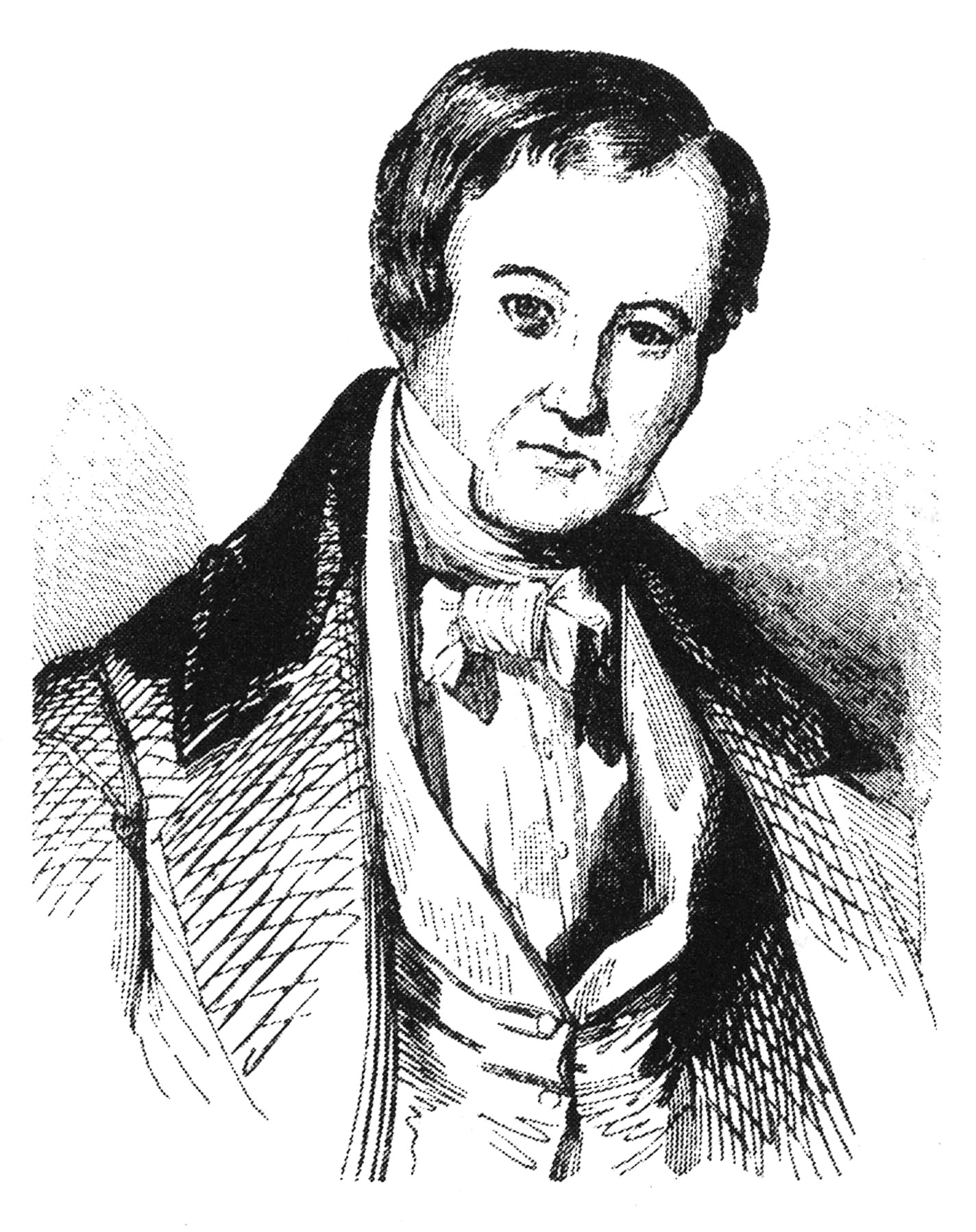
Constantin Siegwart-Mueller

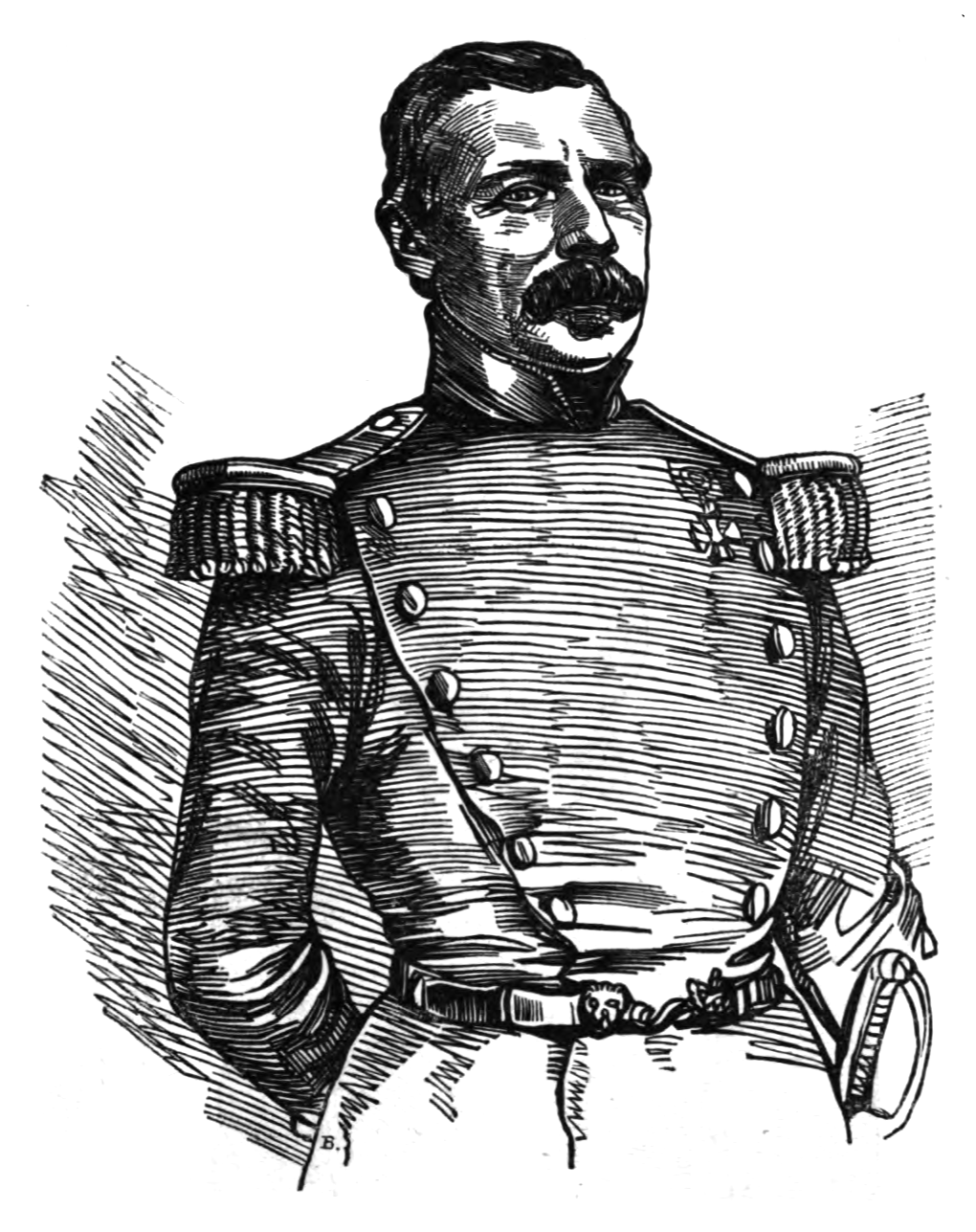
Col Burkardt

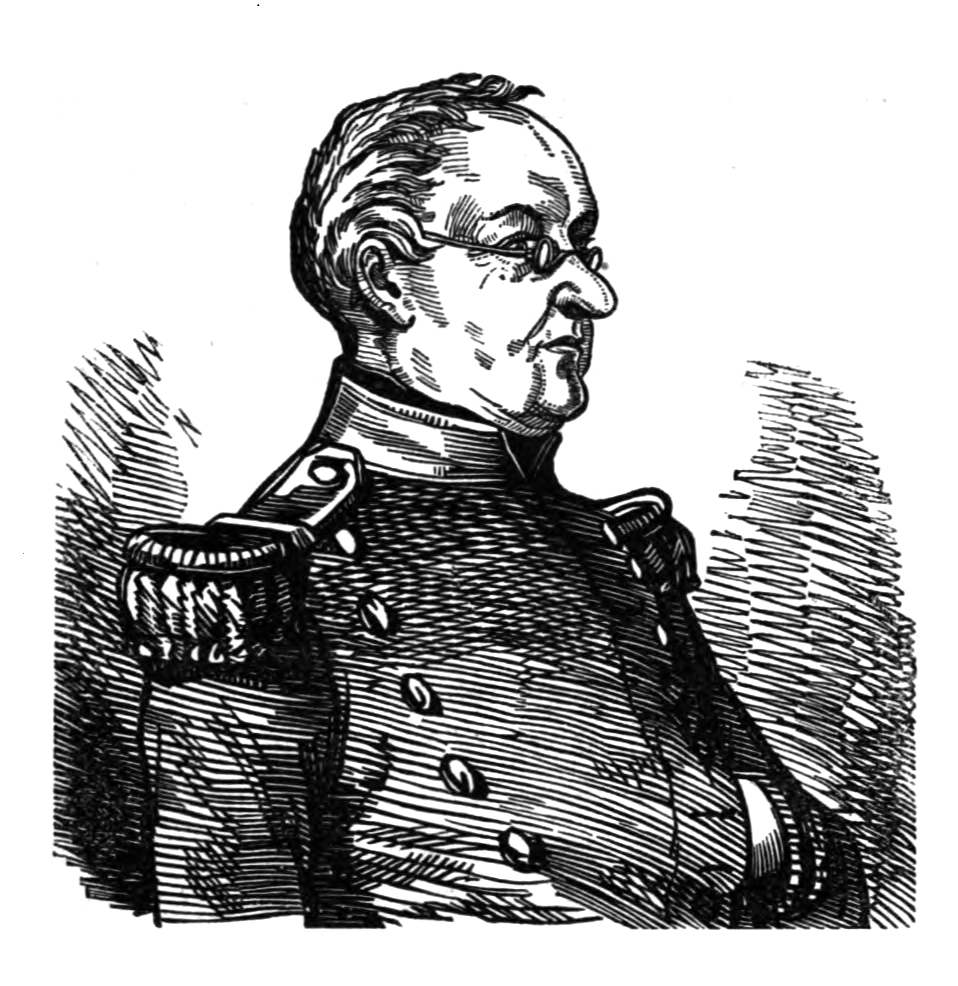
Rageth Abys

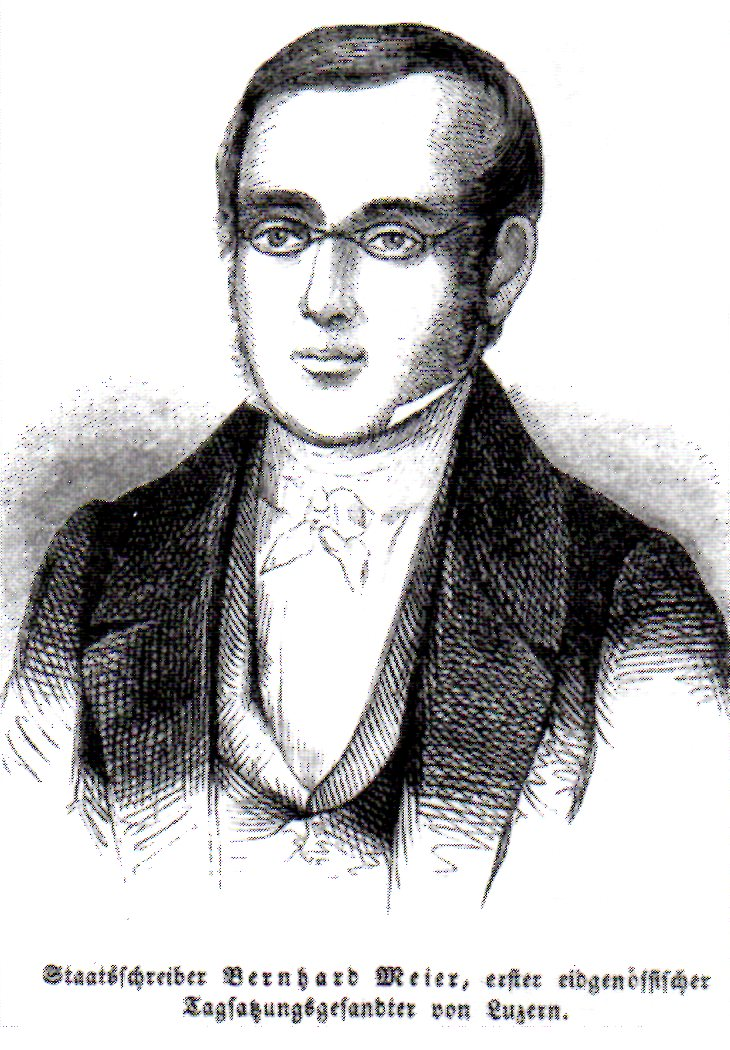
Bernard von Meyer

== See also ==
- First War of Kappel (1529)
- Second War of Kappel (1531)
- First War of Villmergen (1656)
- Toggenburg War or Second War of Villmergen (1712)
- Restoration (Switzerland)
- Switzerland as a federal state
- Federal intervention in Switzerland
