= Switzerland in the Napoleonic era =

During the French Revolutionary Wars, the revolutionary armies marched eastward, enveloping Switzerland in their battles against Austria. In 1798, Switzerland was completely overrun by the French and was renamed the Helvetic Republic. The Helvetic Republic encountered severe economic and political problems. In 1798 the country became a battlefield of the Revolutionary Wars, culminating in the Battles of Zürich in 1799.

In 1803 Napoleon's Act of Mediation reestablished a Swiss Confederation that partially restored the sovereignty of the cantons, and the former tributary and allied territories of Aargau, Thurgau, Graubünden, St. Gallen, Vaud and Ticino became cantons with equal rights.

The Congress of Vienna of 1815 fully re-established Swiss independence and the European powers agreed to permanently recognise Swiss neutrality. At this time, the territory of Switzerland was increased for the last time, by the new cantons of Valais, Neuchâtel and Geneva.

The Restoration, the time leading up to the Sonderbundskrieg, was marked with turmoil, and the rural population struggling against the yoke of the urban centres, for example in the Züriputsch of 1839.

== Fall of the Ancien Régime ==
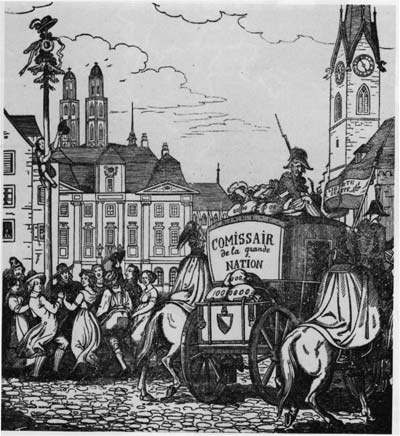
The people of Zürich celebrate dancing around an Arbre de la liberté on the Münsterhof while the French carry off the treasury (1848 woodcut).

Flag of the Helvetic Republic

During the last years of the Ancien Régime, the growing conflicts throughout the Confederation (aristocratic cities against peasant farmers, Protestant against Catholic, and canton against canton) had weakened and distracted the Diet. In Paris, the Helvetian Club, founded in 1790 by several exiled Vaudois and Fribourgers, was the centre from which the ideas of the French Revolution were spread in the western part of the Confederation. During the next eight years, revolts sprang up across the Confederation and, unlike earlier ones, many were successful. In 1790 the Lower Valais rose against the upper districts to which it was subject. In 1791, Porrentruy rebelled against the Bishop of Basel and became the Rauracian republic in November 1792 and in 1793, there was a rebellion in the French department of the Mont Terrible. In 1795, St Gallen successfully revolted against the prince-abbot. These revolts were supported or encouraged by France, but the French army did not directly attack the Confederation.

However, following the French success in the War of the First Coalition (1792–1797) against the aristocratic armies of Prussia and Austria, the time had come for direct action against the aristocratic Ancien Régime in Switzerland. In 1797, the districts of Chiavenna, Valtellina, and Bormio, dependencies of the Three Leagues (an associate of the Confederation), revolted under the encouragement of France. They were quickly invaded and annexed to the Cisalpine Republic on 10 October 1797. In December of the same year, the Bishopric of Basel was occupied and annexed. On 9 December 1797, Frédéric-César de La Harpe, a member of the Helvetian Club from Vaud, asked France to invade Bern to protect Vaud. Seeing a chance to remove a feudal neighbor and gain Bern's wealth, France agreed. By February 1798, French troops occupied Mulhouse and Biel/Bienne. Meanwhile, another army entered Vaud, and the Lemanic Republic was proclaimed. The Diet broke up in dismay without taking any steps to avert the coming storm. On 5 March, troops entered Bern, deserted by her allies and distracted by quarrels within. With Bern, the stronghold of the aristocratic party, in revolutionary hands, the old Confederation collapsed. Within a month, the Confederation was under French control, and all the associate members of the Confederation were gone.

== Helvetic Republic ==
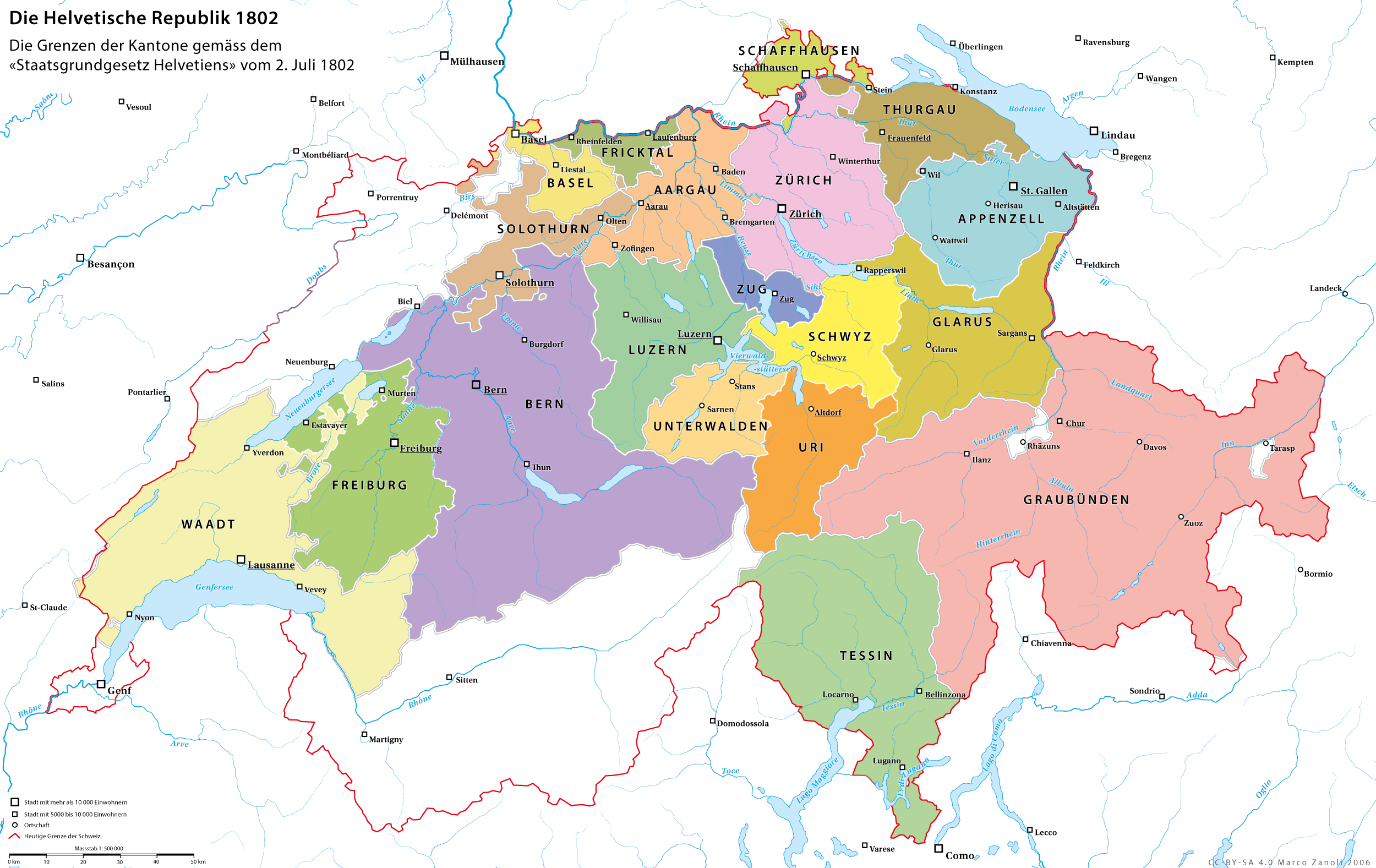
Helvetic Republic, with borders as at the Second Helvetic constitution of 25 May 1802

On 12 April 1798 121 cantonal deputies proclaimed the Helvetic Republic, "One and Indivisible". The new régime abolished cantonal sovereignty and feudal rights. The occupying forces established a centralised state based on the ideas of the French Revolution.

Before the Helvetic Republic, each individual canton had exercised complete sovereignty over its own territory or territories. Little central authority had existed, with matters concerning the country as a whole confined mainly to the Diet, a meeting of leading representatives from the cantons.

The constitution of the Helvetic Republic came mainly from the design of Peter Ochs, a magistrate from Basel. It established a central two-chamber legislature which included the Grand Council (with 8 members per canton) and the Senate (4 members per canton). The executive, known as the Directory, comprised 5 members. The Constitution also established actual Swiss citizenship, as opposed to just citizenship of one's canton of birth. With Swiss citizenship came the absolute freedom to settle in any canton, the political communes were now composed of all residents, and not merely of the burghers. However, the community land and property remained with the former local burghers who were gathered together into the Bürgergemeinde.

No general agreement existed about the future of Switzerland. Leading groups split into the Unitaires, who wanted a united republic, and the Federalists, who represented the old aristocracy and demanded a return to cantonal sovereignty. Coup-attempts became frequent, and the new régime had to rely on the French to survive. Furthermore, the occupying forces plundered many towns and villages. This made it difficult to establish a new working state.

Many Swiss citizens resisted these "progressive" ideas, particularly in the central areas of the country. Some of the more controversial aspects of the new regime limited freedom of worship, which outraged many of the more devout citizens. Several uprisings took place, with the three Forest Cantons (Uri, Schwyz and Unterwalden) rebelling in early 1798. The Schwyzers, under Alois von Reding, were crushed by the French on the heights of Morgarten in April and May, as were the Unterwaldners in August and September. Due to the destruction and plundering, the Swiss soon turned against the French.

After the Forest Cantons uprising, some cantons were merged, thus reducing their anti-centralist effectiveness in the legislature. Uri, Schwyz, Zug and Unterwalden together became the canton of Waldstätten; Glarus and the Sarganserland became the canton of Linth, and Appenzell and St. Gallen combined as the canton of Säntis.

=== French Revolutionary Wars in Switzerland ===
In 1799, Switzerland became a battle-zone between the French, Austrian and Imperial Russian armies, with the locals supporting mainly the latter two, rejecting calls to fight with the French armies in the name of the Helvetic Republic.

==== Battle of Winterthur ====
The Battle of Winterthur (27 May 1799) was an important action between elements of the Army of the Danube, Massena's Army of Switzerland, and elements of the Habsburg army, commanded by the Swiss-born Friedrich Freiherr von Hotze. Winterthur lies 18 kilometers (11 mi) northeast of Zürich. Because of its position at the junction of seven cross-roads, the army that held the town controlled access to most of Switzerland and points crossing the Rhine into southern Germany.

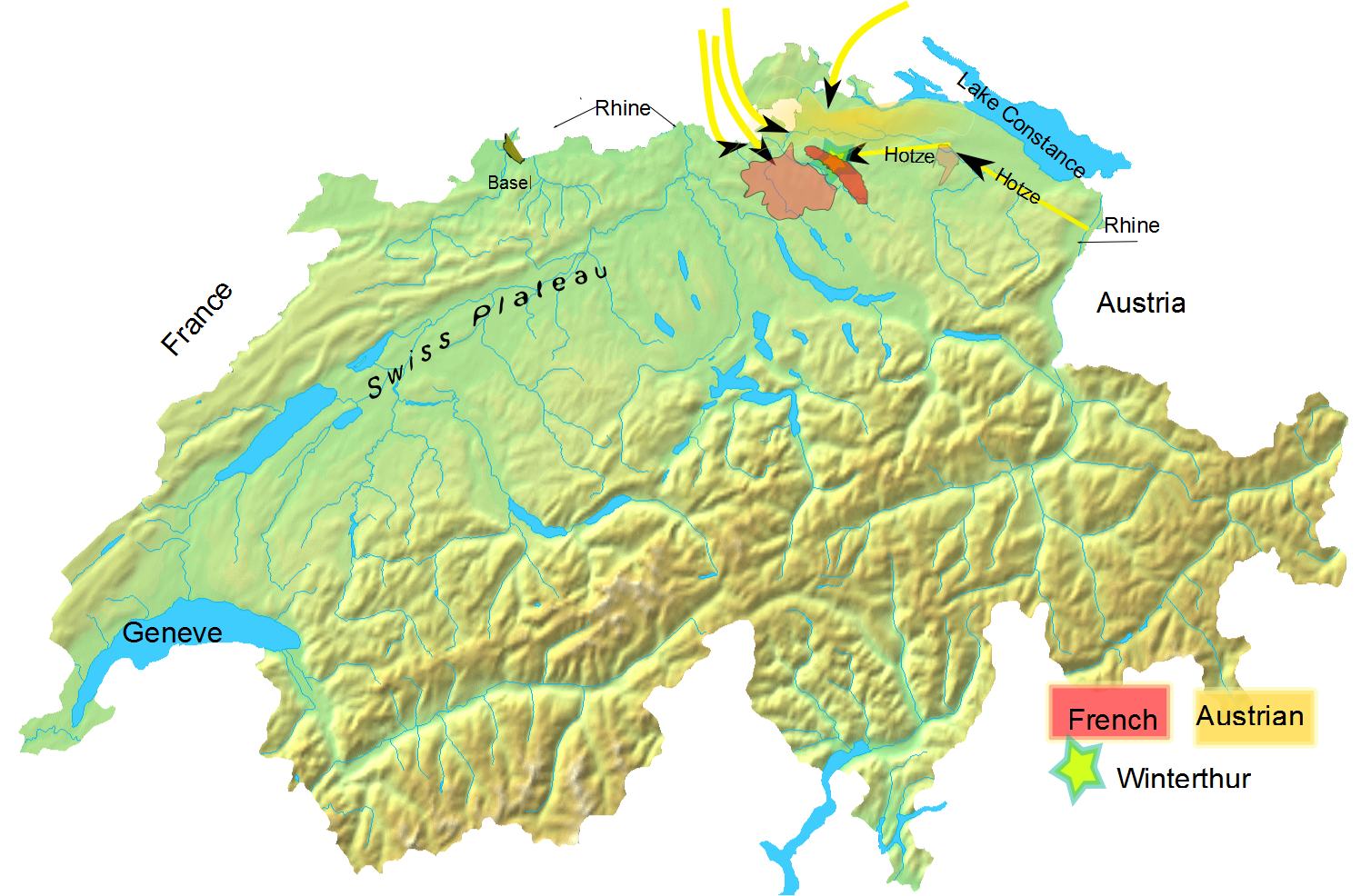
Hotze's troops arrived in the morning at the outskirts of Winterthur and immediately attacked Ney's position. By afternoon, his troops had joined those of Nauendorf and Archduke Charles, marked in yellow.

With the first elements of both Austrian armies having already linked up during the Battle of Frauenfeld two days earlier; Masséna sent the newly promoted General of Division Michel Ney and part of the Army of the Danube to Winterthur on 27 May to stop the Austrian advance from eastern Switzerland. If the Austrians succeeded in uniting Hotze's army from the east with Nauendorf's directly north of Zurich, and Archduke Charles' which lay to the north and west, the French would be dangerously encircled at Zurich.

On the morning of 27 May, Hotze assembled his force into three columns and marched toward Winterthur. Opposite him, Michel Ney deployed his force around the heights, the so-called Ober-Winterthur, a ring of low-lying hills some 6 kilometers (4 mi) north of the city. The overall commander of the forward line, Jean Victor Tharreau, had informed Ney that he would send Jean-de-Dieu Soult's division to support him; Ney understood this to mean he was to make a stand along the entire outpost line, and that he would not be isolated. He expected his small force would receive reinforcements from Soult's division. Consequently, Ney directed the weakest brigade, under the command of Théodore Maxime Gazan, to move up a long valley toward Frauenfeld, and another brigade, under the command of Dominique Mansuy Roget, to take the right, preventing any Austrian flanking maneuver.

By mid-morning, Hotze's advanced guard had encountered moderate French resistance first from the two brigades Ney had at his disposal. The Austrian advance troops quickly overran the weaker brigade and took possession of the woods surrounding the village of Islikon. After securing the villages of Gundeschwil, Schottikon, Wiesendangen, and Stogen, further west of Islikon, Hotze deployed two of his columns facing the French front, while a third angled to the French right, as Ney had expected he would. Soult never appeared (he was later court-martialed for insubordination) and Ney withdrew his forces through Winterthur, regrouping with Tharreau's main force in the outskirts of Zurich. A day later, Hotze's force united with the main Austrian force of Archduke Charles.

==== Battles for Zürich ====
In the First Battle of Zürich, on 4–7 June 1799, approximately 45,000 French and 53,000 Austrians clashed on the plains around the city. On the left wing, Hotze had 20 battalions of infantry, plus support artillery, and 27 squadrons of cavalry, in total, 19,000 men. On the right wing, General Friedrich Joseph, Count of Nauendorf commanded another 18,000. The battle cost both sides dearly; General of Brigade Cherin was killed, on the French side, and on the Austrian side, Feldzeugmeister (General of Infantry) Olivier, Count of Wallis, was killed. On the French side, 500 died, 800 were wounded and 300 captured; on the Austrian side, 730 killed, 1,470 wounded, and 2,200 captured. When the Austrians took the French positions in the city, they also captured over 150 guns. Ultimately, French general André Masséna yielded the city to the Austrians, under Archduke Charles. Massena retreated beyond the river Limmat, where he managed to fortify his positions. Hotze's force harassed their retreat, and secured the river shoreline. Despite Hotze's aggressive harassment of the French retreat, Charles did not follow up on the withdrawal; Masséna established himself on the opposite bank of the Limmat without threat of pursuit from the main body of the Austrian Army, much to the annoyance of the Russian liaison officer, Alexander Ivanovich, Count Ostermann-Tolstoy.

On 14 August 1799, a Russian force of 6,000 cavalry, 20,000 infantry, and 1,600 Cossacks, under Alexander Korsakov, joined Archduke Charles' force in Schaffhausen. In a vice-like operation, together with the Russians, they would surround André Masséna's smaller army on the banks of the Limmat, where it had taken refuge the previous spring. To divert this attack, General Claude Lecourbe, attacked the pontoon bridges over which the Austrians crossed the Rhine, destroying most of them, and making the rest unusable.

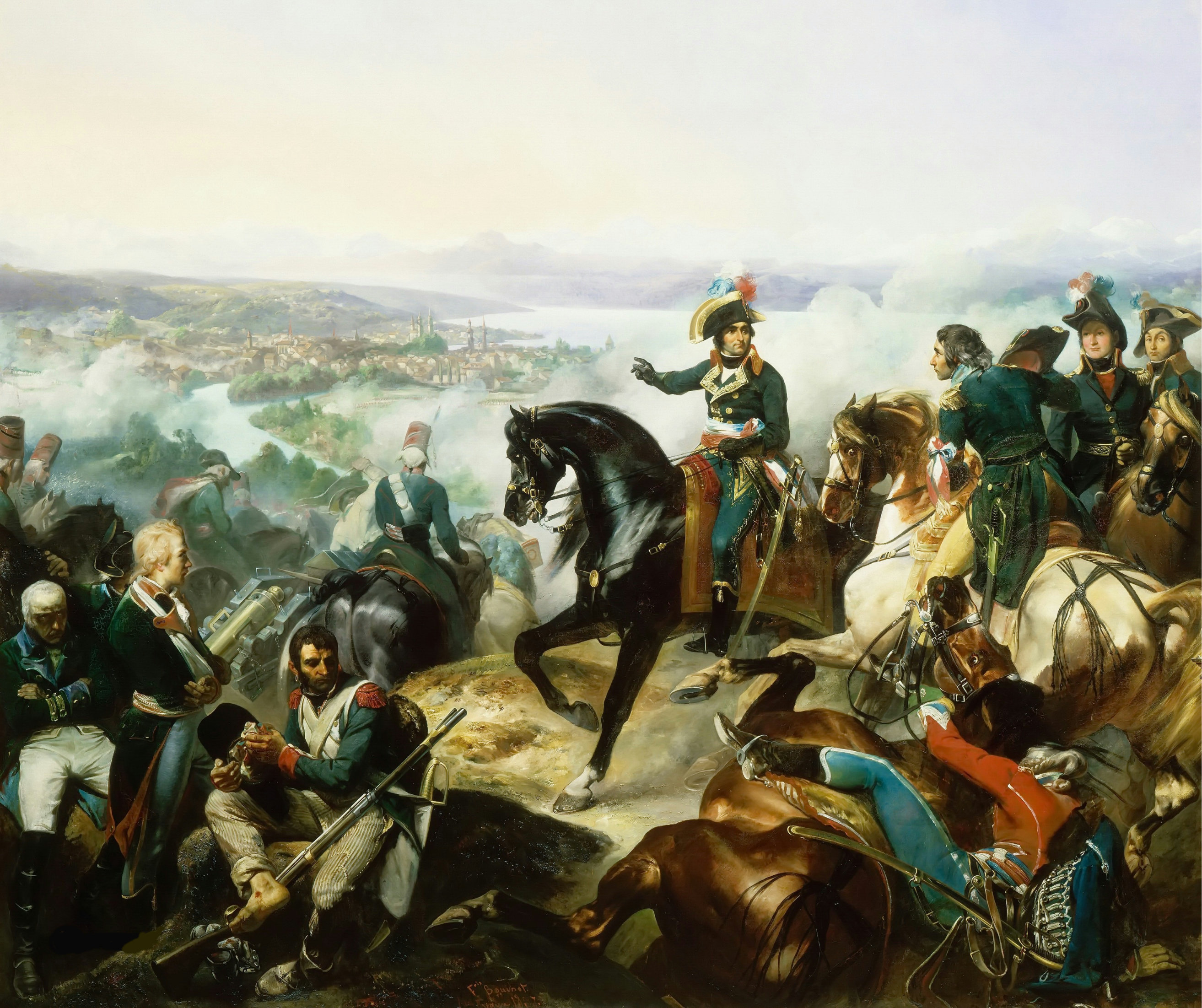
The Battle of Zurich by François Bouchot, 1835. Masséna at the Second Battle of Zurich

Before Charles could regroup, orders arrived from the Aulic Council, the imperial body in Vienna charged with conduct of war, to countermand his plan; Charles' troops were to leave Zurich in the supposedly capable hands of Korsokov, re-cross the Rhine and march north to Mainz. Charles stalled this operation as long as he could, but eventually he had to concede to Vienna's orders. Consequently, the Russian troops under a novice general replaced the Austrian troops and their seasoned commander. Charles withdrew his force to the north of the Rhine. Although the order to Charles to recross the Rhine and march north was eventually countermanded, by the time such instructions reached him, they were too late to reverse.

In the Second Battle of Zürich, the French regained control of the city, along with the rest of Switzerland. Notably, Massena out-generaled Korsakov; surrounded him, tricked him, and then took more than half his army prisoner, plus captured the baggage train and most of his cannons, and inflicted over 8,000 casualties. Most of the fighting took place on both banks of the Limmat up to the gates of Zürich, and part within the city itself. Zürich had declared itself neutral, and was spared general destruction. General Nicolas Oudinot commanded the French forces on the right bank and General Édouard Mortier, those on the left.

On the same day, Jean-de-Dieu Soult and about 10,000 troops faced Hotze and 8,000 Allies in the Battle of Linth River. Soult sent 150 volunteers to swim the river in the middle of the night. Most carried a saber in their teeth and a pistol and cartridges tied to their heads; others carried drums or bugles. These soldiers killed the Austrian sentries, overran an outpost, made much confusing noise, and signaled Soult's main force to cross in boats. Hotze was killed during this maneuver when Soult's men surprised him on an early morning reconnaissance. Franz Petrasch assumed command but his troops were badly beaten and forced to retreat, losing 3,500 prisoners, 25 field guns, and four colors.

While Masséna and Soult were drubbing the Allies, Alexander Suvorov's 21,285 Russians arrived in Switzerland from Italy. In the Battle of Gotthard Pass from 24–26 September, Suvorov's army pushed aside Lecourbe's 8,000 troops and reached Altdorf near Lake Lucerne. From there, Suvorov led his army across the Kinzig Pass hoping to make a junction with the other Allied forces. At Muotathal, Suvorov finally learned that disaster had overtaken the Allied forces and that his army was marooned. The Russians broke out of the trap and were at St. Gallen in early October. Suvorov was forced to lead his men over the Alps to the Vorarlberg, resulting in additional losses.

=== Civil war and the end of the Republic ===
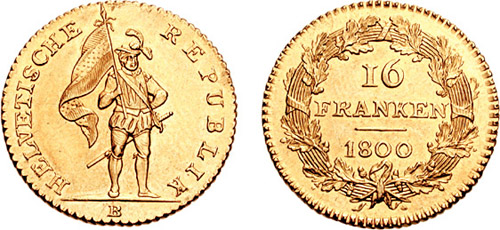
16 Frank coin issued by the Helvetic Republic, this represents the first national coinage of Switzerland.

Instability in the Republic reached its peak in 1802–03—including the Stecklikrieg civil war of 1802. Together with local resistance, financial problems caused the Helvetic Republic to collapse, and its government took refuge in Lausanne. Due to the instability of the situation, the Helvetic Republic had over six constitutions in a period of four years.

At that time Napoleon Bonaparte, then First Consul of France, summoned representatives of both sides to Paris in order to negotiate a solution. Although the Federalist representatives formed a minority at the conciliation conference, known as the "Helvetic Consulta"; Bonaparte characterised Switzerland as federal "by nature" and considered it unwise to force the area into any other constitutional framework.

On 19 February 1803, the Act of Mediation restored the cantons. With the abolition of the centralized state, Switzerland became a confederation once again.

The period of the Helvetic Republic is still very controversial within Switzerland. It represents the first time that Switzerland as a unified country existed and a step toward the modern federal state. For the first time the population was defined as Swiss, not as members of a specific canton. For cantons like Vaud, Thurgau and Ticino the Republic was a time of political freedom from other cantons. However, the Republic also marked a time of foreign domination and revolution. For the cantons of Bern, Schwyz and Nidwalden it was a time of military defeat followed by occupation. In 1995 the Federal Parliament chose to not celebrate the 200 year anniversary of the Helvetic Republic, but to allow individual cantons to celebrate if they wished.

== Act of Mediation ==
Swiss Confederation Schweizerische Eidgenossenschaft Confédération suisse Confederazione Svizzera
- 1803–1815
- Flag Coat of arms

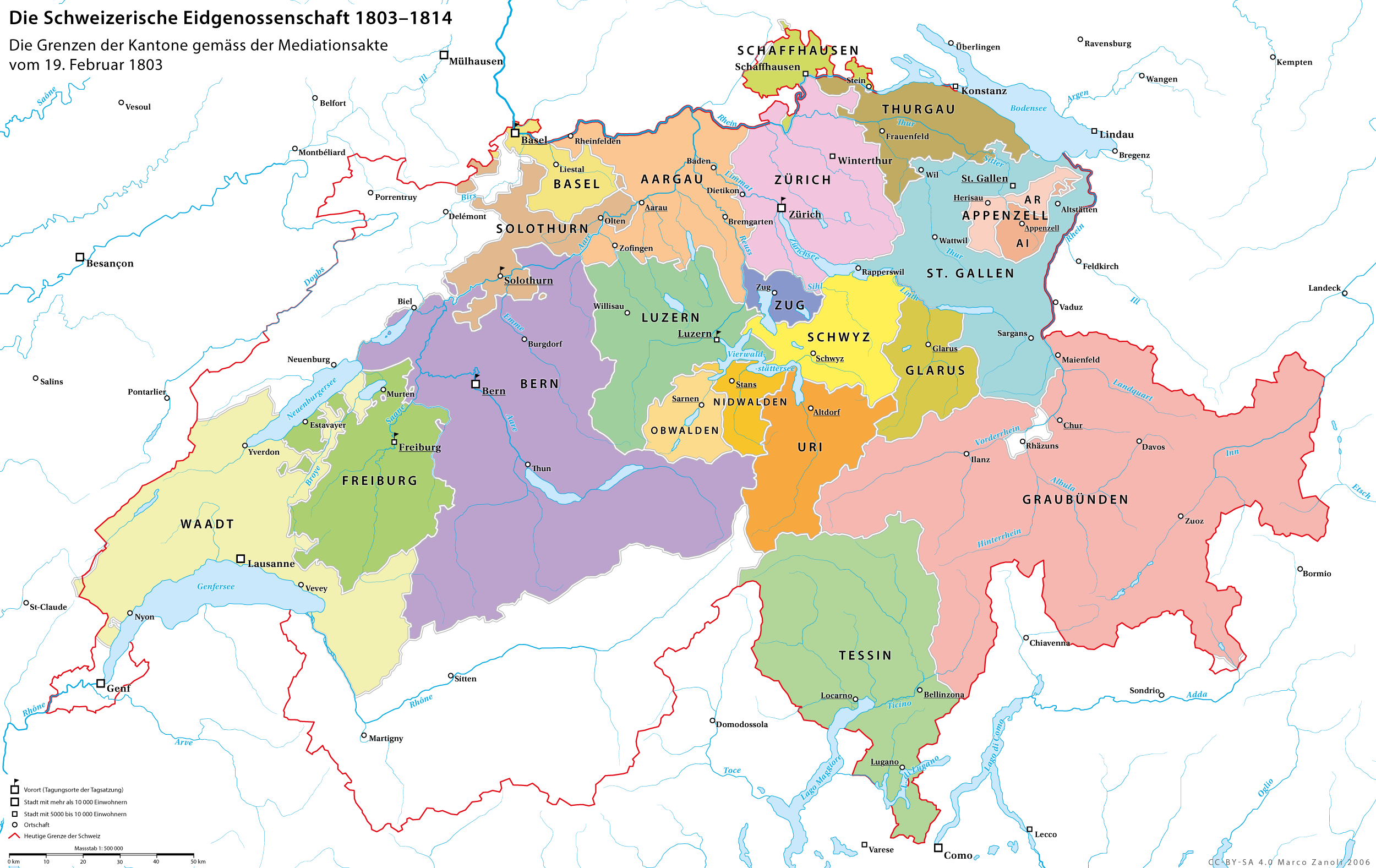
- Status: Client state of the French Empire
- Capital: 6 cities
- Common languages: Swiss French, Swiss German, Swiss Italian, Rhaeto-Romance languages
- Demonym: Swiss
- Government: Federal republic
- Mediator
  - 1803–1815: Napoleon Bonaparte
- Legislature: Tagsatzung
- Historical era: Napoleonic Wars
  - Act of Mediation: 19 February 1803
  - Federal Treaty: 7 August 1815
Preceded by
Helvetic Republic
Fricktal
Tarasp
Succeeded by
Restored Swiss Confederacy

The Swiss Confederation was re-established as a result of the Act of Mediation issued by Napoleon Bonaparte on 19 February 1803 in the aftermath of the Stecklikrieg. The period of Swiss history from 1803 to 1815 is itself known as Mediation. The act abolished the previous Helvetic Republic, which had existed since the invasion of Switzerland by French troops in March 1798. After the withdrawal of French troops in July 1802, the Republic collapsed (Stecklikrieg). The Act of Mediation was Napoleon's attempt at a compromise between the Ancien Régime and a Republic. This intermediary stage of Swiss history lasted until the Restoration of 1815.

In 1803 Napoleon's Act of Mediation partially restored the sovereignty of the cantons, and the former subject territories of Aargau, Thurgau, Vaud, and Ticino became cantons with equal rights.

Likewise, the Three Leagues, formerly an associate (Zugewandter Ort) but not a full member of the confederacy, became a full member as the canton of Graubünden. The city of St. Gallen, also historically an associate of the confederacy, along with its own former subject territories (and with those formerly belonging to the Abbey of Saint Gall) became a full member as the canton of St. Gallen, for a total of nineteen cantons.

In contrast, the territories of Biel, Valais, the Principality of Neuchâtel (later canton of Neuchâtel), of the Bishopric of Basel (later Bernese Jura), and of the Republic of Geneva (later canton of Geneva) did not become part of the Swiss confederacy until the end of the Napoleonic era.

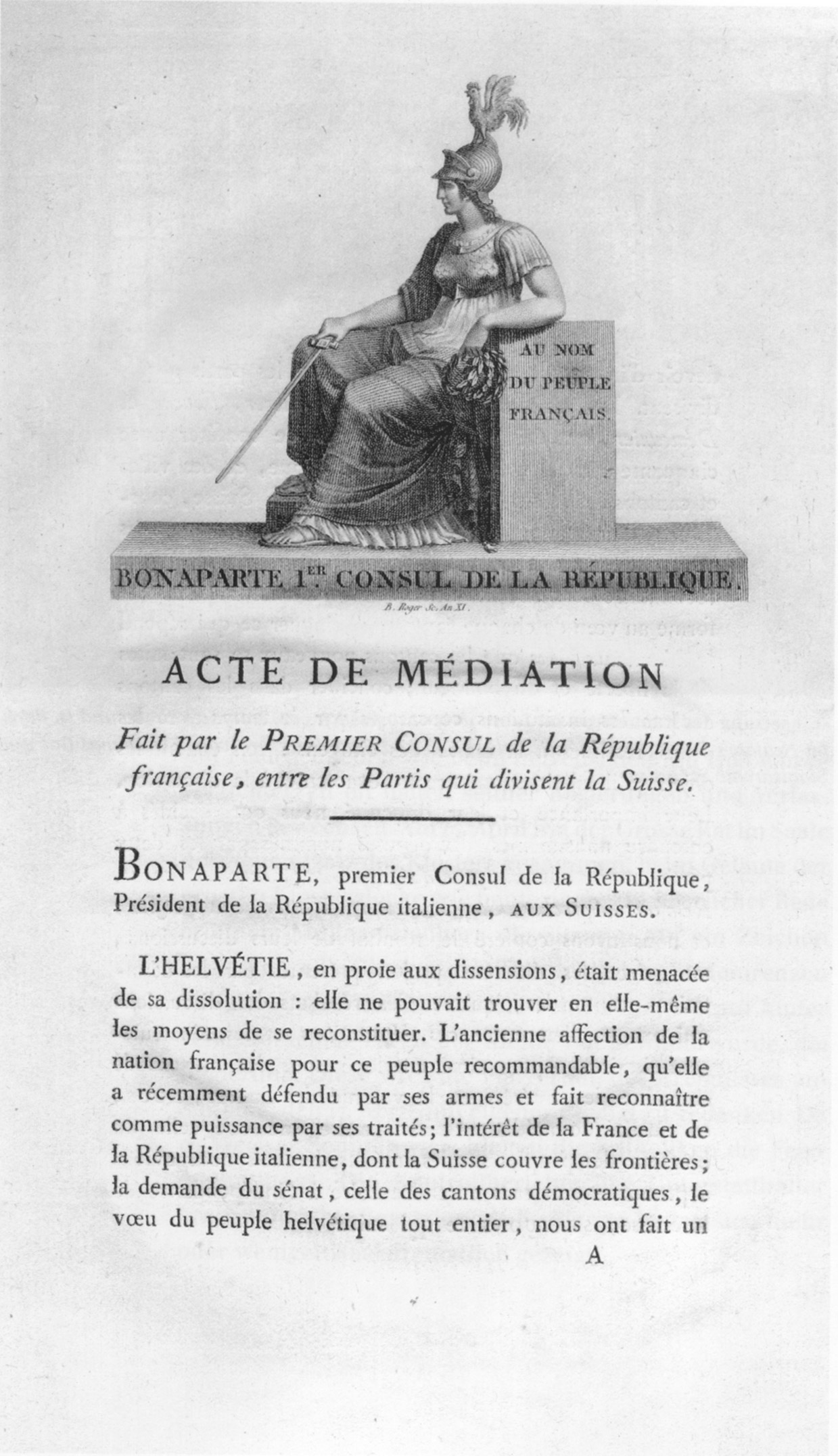
Act of Mediation, 1803

With Napoleon acting as a mediator and declaring that the natural political state of the Swiss is a Federation, the Act of Mediation dissolved the Helvetic Republic and addressed many of the issues that had torn the Republic apart. It restored the original Thirteen Cantons of the old Confederation and added six new cantons, two (St Gallen and Graubünden or Grisons) having been formerly associates, and the four others being made up of the subject lands conquered at different times — Aargau (1415), Thurgau (1460), Ticino (1440, 1500, 1512), and Vaud (1536).

The Act of Mediation consists of nineteen separate constitutions for the nineteen sovereign cantons, ordered alphabetically, followed by a "Federal Act" (Acte Fédéral, pp. 101–109) detailing mutual obligations between the cantons and provisions for the Federal Diet. In the Diet, six cantons which had a population of more than 100,000 (Bern, Zurich, Vaud, St Gallen, Graubünden and Aargau) were given two votes, the others having but one apiece. Meetings of the Diet were to be held alternately at Fribourg, Bern, Solothurn, Basel, Zürich and Lucerne. The Landsgemeinden, or popular assemblies, were restored in the democratic cantons, the cantonal governments in other cases being in the hands of a great council (legislative) and the small council (executive). There were to be no privileged classes, burghers or subject lands. Every Swiss citizen was to be free to move and settle anywhere in the new Confederation.

However the rights promised in the Act of Mediation soon began to erode. Ticino was occupied by French troops from 1810 to 1813. At home the liberty of moving from one canton to another (though given by the constitution) was, by the Diet in 1805, restricted by requiting ten years' residence, and then not granting political rights in the canton or a right of profiting by the communal property.

As soon as Napoleon's power began to wane (1812–1813), the position of Switzerland became endangered. The Austrians, supported by the reactionary party in Switzerland, and without any real resistance on the part of the Diet, crossed the border on 21 December 1813. On 29 December under pressure from Austria, the Diet abolished the 1803 constitution which had been created by Napoleon in the Act of Mediation.

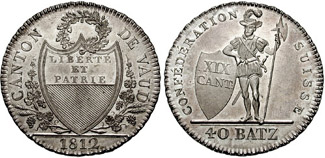
40 Batzen coin of Vaud (1812)

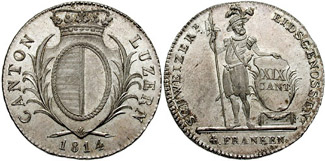
4 Franken coin of Luzern (1814)

On 6 April 1814 the so-called Long Diet met to replace the constitution. The Diet remained dead-locked until 12 September when Valais, Neuchâtel and Geneva were raised to full members of the Confederation. This increased the number of cantons to 22. The Diet, however, made little progress until the Congress of Vienna.

== Restoration ==
On 20 March 1815 Bern was given the town of Biel/Bienne and much of the land that had been owned by the Bishop of Basel as compensation for territory lost during the Long Diet. The Valtellina, formerly owned by Graubunden, was granted to Austria. Muhlhausen (Mulhouse in French) was left as part of France.

On 7 August 1815, the Federal Treaty went into force and the new constitution was sworn to by all the cantons except Nidwalden. Nidwalden only agreed under military force on 30 August and as punishment lost Engelberg to Obwalden. By the new constitution the sovereign rights of each canton were fully recognized, and a return made to the lines of the old constitution, though there were to be no subject lands, and political rights were not to be the exclusive privilege of any class of citizens. Each canton had one vote in the Diet, where an absolute majority was to decide all matters save foreign affairs, when a majority of three-fourths was required.

== See also ==
- Campaigns of 1798 in the French Revolutionary Wars
- Campaigns of 1799 in the French Revolutionary Wars

== Bibliography ==
- Atteridge, Andrew Hilliarde. The bravest of the brave, Michel Ney: marshal of France, duke of Elchingen. New York: Brentano, 1913.
- Blanning, Timothy. The French Revolutionary Wars, New York: Oxford University Press, 1996, ISBN 0-340-56911-5.
- Cleveland, Jordan R. (2026). "Securing Geneva After Napoleon: Borders, Diplomacy, and the Construction of an Imposed Neutrality", in Christopher Changwe Nshimbi (ed.), Trade, Capital, and Labor, in Alexander C Diener, and Joshua Hagen (eds), Oxford Intersections: Borders (Oxford, online edn, Oxford Academic, 20 Nov. 2025 - ), https://doi.org/10.1093/9780198945222.003.0140.
- Duffy, Christopher (1999). Eagles Over the Alps: Suvarov in Italy and Switzerland, 1799. Chicago, Ill.: The Emperor's Press. ISBN 1-883476-18-6.
- (in German) Ebert, Jens-Florian. "Friedrich Freiherr von Hotze." Die Österreichischen Generäle 1792–1815. Accessed 15 October 2009.
- (in German) Hürlimann, Katja. "Friedrich von Hotze." Historisches Lexikon der Schweiz. 15 January 2008 edition, Accessed 18 October 2009.
- Marabello, Thomas Quinn (2023) "Challenges to Swiss Democracy: Neutrality, Napoleon, & Nationalism," Swiss American Historical Society Review, Vol. 59: No. 2. Available at: https://scholarsarchive.byu.edu/sahs_review/vol59/iss2/5
- Maur, Jost Auf der (2023) "Napoleon's Role in the Making of Modern Switzerland," Swiss American Historical Society Review, Vol. 59: No. 1. Available at: https://scholarsarchive.byu.edu/sahs_review/vol59/iss1/3
- Phipps, Ramsay Weston (2011) [1939]. The Armies of the First French Republic and the Rise of the Marshals of Napoleon I: The Armies of the Rhine in Switzerland, Holland, Italy, Egypt, and the Coup d'Etat of Brumaire (1797-1799). Vol. 5. Pickle Partners Publishing. ISBN 978-1-908692-28-3.
- Rothenberg, Gunther E. (2007). Napoleon's Great Adversaries: Archduke Charles and the Austrian Army 1792–1914. Stroud, Gloucestershire: Spellmount. ISBN 978-1-86227-383-2.
- Shadwell, Lawrence. Mountain warfare illustrated by the campaign of 1799 in Switzerland: being a translation of the Swiss narrative, compiled from the works of the Archduke Charles, Jomini, and other...London: Henry S. King, 1875.
- Smith, Digby. The Napoleonic Wars Databook. London: Greenhill, 1998, ISBN 1-85367-276-9.
- Thiers, Adolphe. The history of the French revolution. New York, Appleton, 1854, v. 4.
