= Alois von Reding =

Swiss military officer and politician

Count Alois von Reding
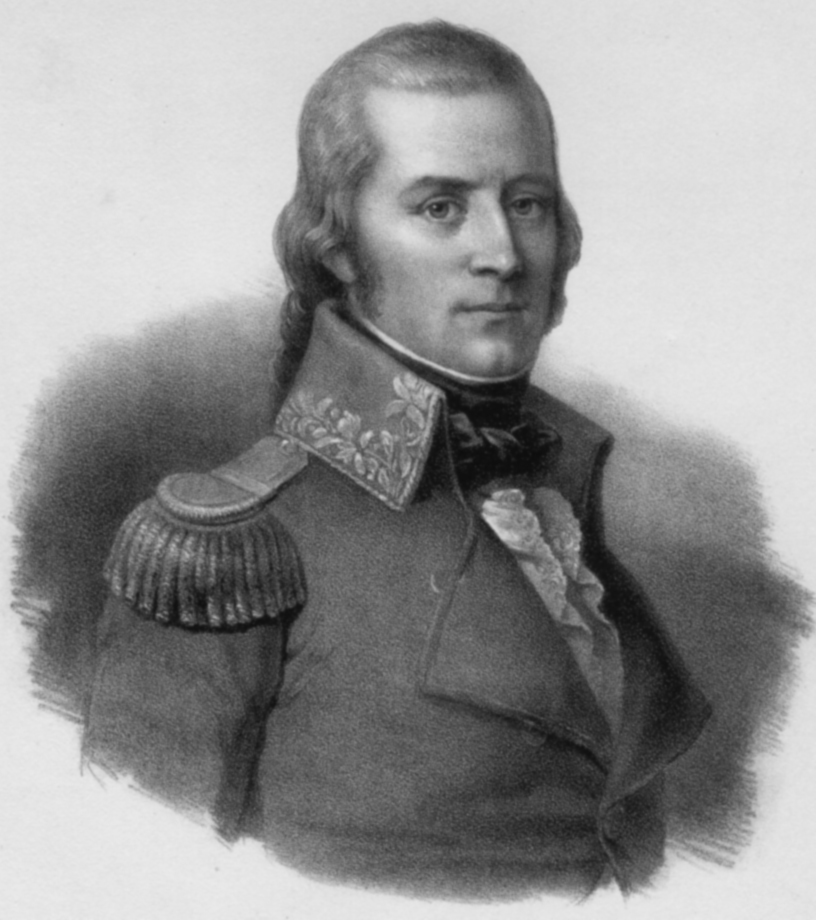
- Born: 6 March 1765; Schwyz, Switzerland
- Died: 5 February 1818 (aged 52); Schwyz, Switzerland
- Military career
- Allegiance: Spain; Old Swiss Confederacy
- Branch: Army
- Service years: 1781–1798, 1802
- Rank: (Spain) Lieutenant-colonel (Old Swiss Confederacy) Elected Commander-in-Chief
- Commands: Swiss local armies (Schwyz, Uri, Nidwalden)
- Conflicts: American Revolutionary War; Anglo-French War (1778–1783); Invasion of Minorca (1781); French Revolutionary Wars; War of the First Coalition; War of the Pyrenees; French invasion of Switzerland; Stecklikrieg
- Other work: Governor of Schwyz; Delegate to the Swiss Federal Diet representing Schwyz

Count Josef Fridolin Vinzenz Aloys Reding von Biberegg (Schwyz, 6 March 1765 – Schwyz, 5 February 1818) was a Swiss military officer and politician, best known for leading an early revolt against the Helvetic Republic.

== Early life and career ==
Reding was born in Schwyz, Switzerland, to Theodor Anton Reding, a lieutenant-colonel in the Spanish Army, and Magdalena Freuler. In 1781, he followed his brothers Theodor and Nazar and became a mercenary in Spanish service. He took part in the invasion of Minorca in 1782, during the Anglo-French War (1778–1783), and in the War of the Pyrenees against Revolutionary France in 1793–1794, reaching the rank of lieutenant-colonel.

After returning to Schwyz in 1794, Reding became Landeshauptmann of the canton of Schwyz in 1796, and was charged with reorganizing the canton's defences.

== Helvetic Republic ==
In early 1798, France invaded Switzerland and replaced the Old Swiss Confederacy with the Helvetic Republic, a French client state. In April 1798, after the canton of Bern had surrendered, Reding led an army of 10,000 men from the cantons of Uri, Schwyz and Nidwalden against the French and the Helvetic Republic. He was able to gain control of Lucerne at the end of the month and marched across the Brünig Pass into the Bernese Oberland. Despite capturing several territories, Reding was forced to retreat and focus on the defense of his own canton. Heavily outnumbered, Reding was forced to submit to French General Balthazar Alexis Henri Schauenburg on 13 May.

After the capitulation of Schwyz, Reding occupied himself with the care of war orphans, the improvement of education and the internal organization of the canton. He was briefly imprisoned in Aarburg Castle in 1799. As a result of Reding's surrender, the French were quick to take counter measures to prevent another revolt from occurring. General Schauenburg and Reding agreed to a ceasefire and the cantons of Uri, Schwyz and Nidwalden were merged into one canton which came to be known as the Canton of Waldstatten. This led to the number of councilmen representing the newly formed canton reduce drastically, thus limiting its effectiveness in the central government.

Amid the political instability of the Helvetic Republic, in October 1801 Reding was appointed its "First Landammann", following a coup d'état. In this office he attempted to prevent Napoleon from detaching the Valais from the Republic (as the Republic of Valais), sided with the Federalists against the Republicans, and established relations with Austria and Prussia. He was overthrown by the Republicans on 17 April 1802. Reding then became one of the leaders of the Stecklikrieg revolt, which caused the collapse of the Republic, and was imprisoned for several months after France re-occupied the country.

== Later life ==
In 1803, the Helvetic Republic came to an end with Napoleon's Act of Mediation, which saw the re-establishment of the Swiss Confederation, though not as a restoration of the ancien régime. Reding subsequently served as Landamann of Schwyz from 1803 to 1805, and again from 1809 to 1810. He also became a delegate to the Swiss Federal Diet, while refusing all honorary posts at the national level offered to him. Through diplomacy, he unsuccessfully tried to keep Switzerland out of the War of the Seventh Coalition. France elevated him to the title of count in his later years. Reding died in Schwyz on 5 February 1818.
