= Andermatt (surname) =

Andermatt is a surname. Notable people with the surname include:

- Adrian Andermatt (born 1969), Swiss swimmer
- Clara Andermatt (born 1963), Portuguese contemporary dancer and choreographer
- Joseph Leonz Andermatt (1740–1817), Swiss general
- Martin Andermatt (born 1961), Swiss footballer and manager
- Werner Andermatt (1916–2013), Swiss painter
