= Federal Treaty =

Document establishing Swiss Confederacy of 1815

The Federal Treaty of 7 August 1815 (readable in PDF).

The Federal Treaty (German: Bundesvertrag, French: Pacte fédéral, Italian: Patto federale) was the legal foundation for the new Swiss Confederacy of 1815. It came about after interventions by the great powers of the Sixth Coalition that defeated Napoleon.

The Federal Treaty defined a confederation between 22 independent Cantons. From 1815 until the Swiss Federal Constitution of 1848, it acted as the Restorationist Constitution of Switzerland.

== Historical development ==
When the anti-French troops marched into Switzerland in 1813, the Act of Mediation imposed by Napoleon in 1803 lost meaning and was repealed by 10 of the 19 cantons, who simultaneously founded the Confederate Convention in Zürich with the goal of establishing a new "Federal Union" (Bundesverein) with the Old Swiss Confederacy in mind. 9 old and 5 new cantons were represented. From February 1814 on, a new constitution was being negotiated to replace the Act of Mediation.

At the same time, the Reaction was developing fast. The Bernese bourgeoisie staged a coup d'état in the Canton of Bern, abolished the sovereignty of Vaud and Aargau and annexed them back to Bern. In the cantons of Solothurn, Fribourg and Lucerne the bourgeoisie seized power in 1814 as well. The Waldstätte Schwyz, Nidwalden and Uri as well as Zug wanted to return to the time before the Helvetic Republic and convened an Anti-Diet. In March 1814, Switzerland teetered on the brink of civil war between the reactionary cantons led by Bern against the moderate cantons led by Zürich. With the so-called "Long Diet" from 6 April 1814 until 31 August 1815 envoys of the European great powers imposed the existence of the new cantons and threatened with a "forced intermediation" if the Confederates would not come to terms with themselves. Under the influence of Ioannis Kapodistrias, Stratford Canning, Claude Marie Gustave de Damas and August Ernst von Steigentesch, a new draft constitution was formed. In it, the military competence of the Confederacy was strengthened, which the reactionary regions vehemently rejected: only 9.5 cantons agreed (Nidwalden was a so-called "half-canton") and especially the great Bern opposed it. When the reactionary cantons were again being driven into forming a separate alliance (Sonderbund) and thus civil war was looming once more, the great powers considered partitioning Switzerland, which eventually resulted in an agreement by the Diet and led to a new treaty. The new Federal Treaty was adopted on 9 September 1814 and went into force on 7 August 1815.

== Contents of the Federal Treaty ==
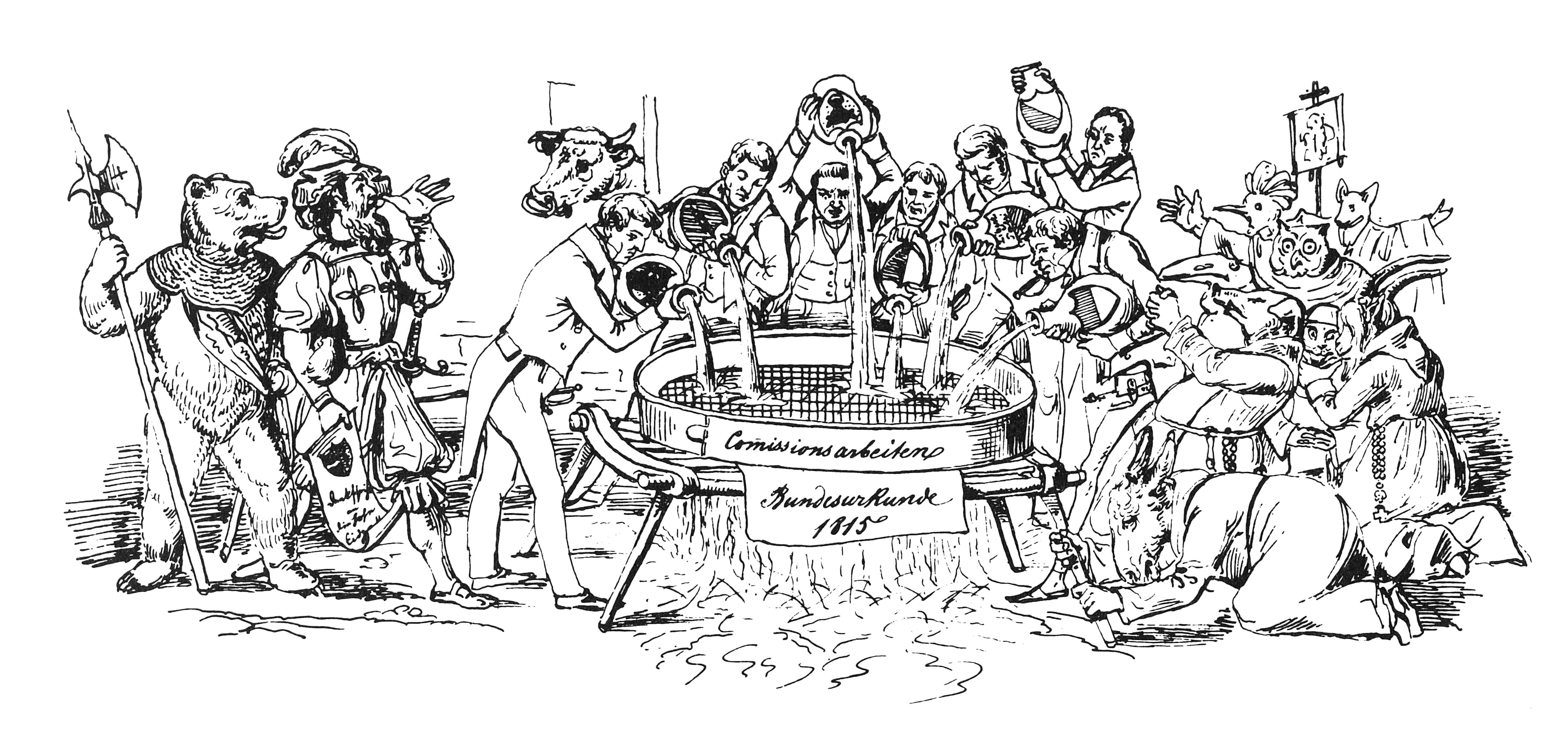
Too many cooks spoil the broth. Cartoon on the Federal Treaty's creation by Heinrich von Arx, 1833

The Federal Treaty consisted of 15 Articles. It guaranteed the equally treated freedom of the cantons, civil rights were mentioned in the so-called Untertanenverbot ("prohibition of subjects"). The federal authority, greatly weakened in comparison to the Act of Mediation, was in the hands of the Diet, that alternately convened in the prominent cities of Zürich, Bern and Lucerne. The sole competence of the Confederacy was in the common security policy (army). There was no longer any Swiss Landammann either. Territorial conflicts between the cantons were to be resolved by an arbitration court of the Congress of Vienna.

An open and unresolved issue was the question of a Sonderbund or separate alliance. In 1847, this led to the Sonderbund War and eventually in 1848 to the replacement of the Federal Treaty by the Federal Constitution.

== See also ==
- Toggenburg War
- Stecklikrieg
- Sonderbund War
