= Swiss Federal Constitution =

Supreme law of Switzerland

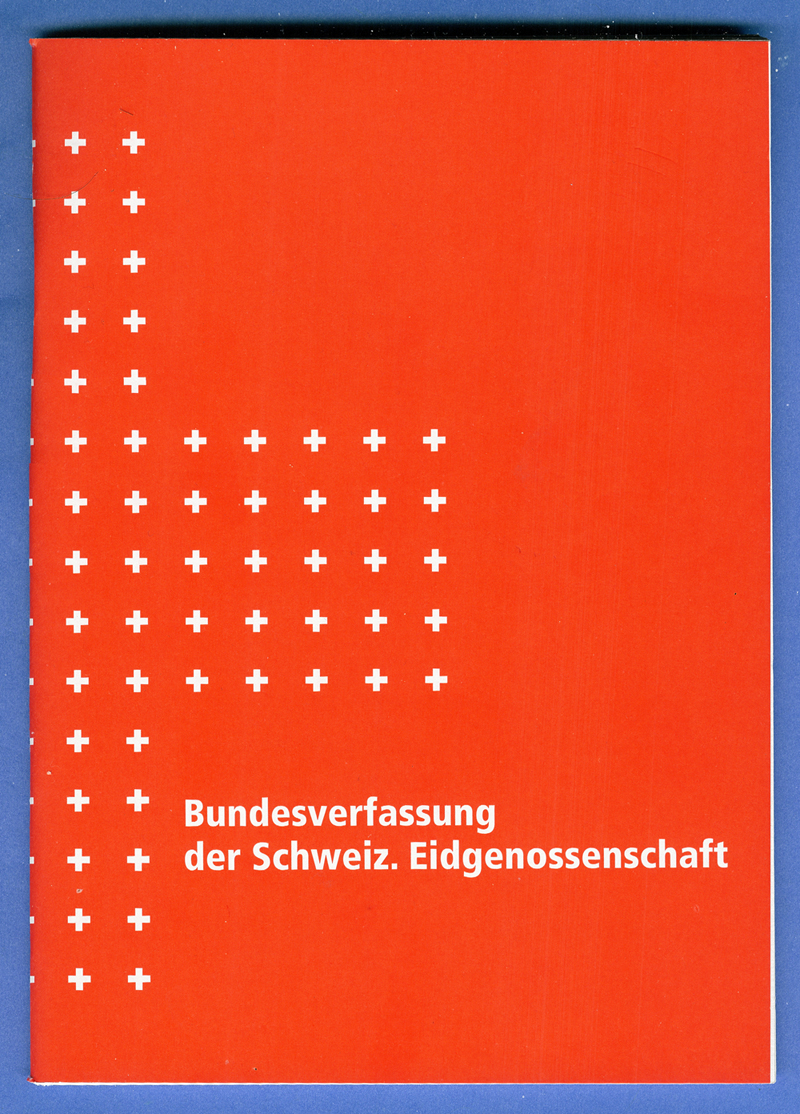
- Cover of the German version

Overview
- Jurisdiction: Switzerland
- Date effective: 1 January 2000
- System: Federal assembly-independent directorial republic under a semi-direct democracy

Government structure
- Branches: Three
- Chambers: Two (upper: Council of States; lower: National Council)
- Executive: Federal Council
- Judiciary: Federal Supreme Court
- Federalism: Yes
- Supersedes: Federal Constitution of 1874

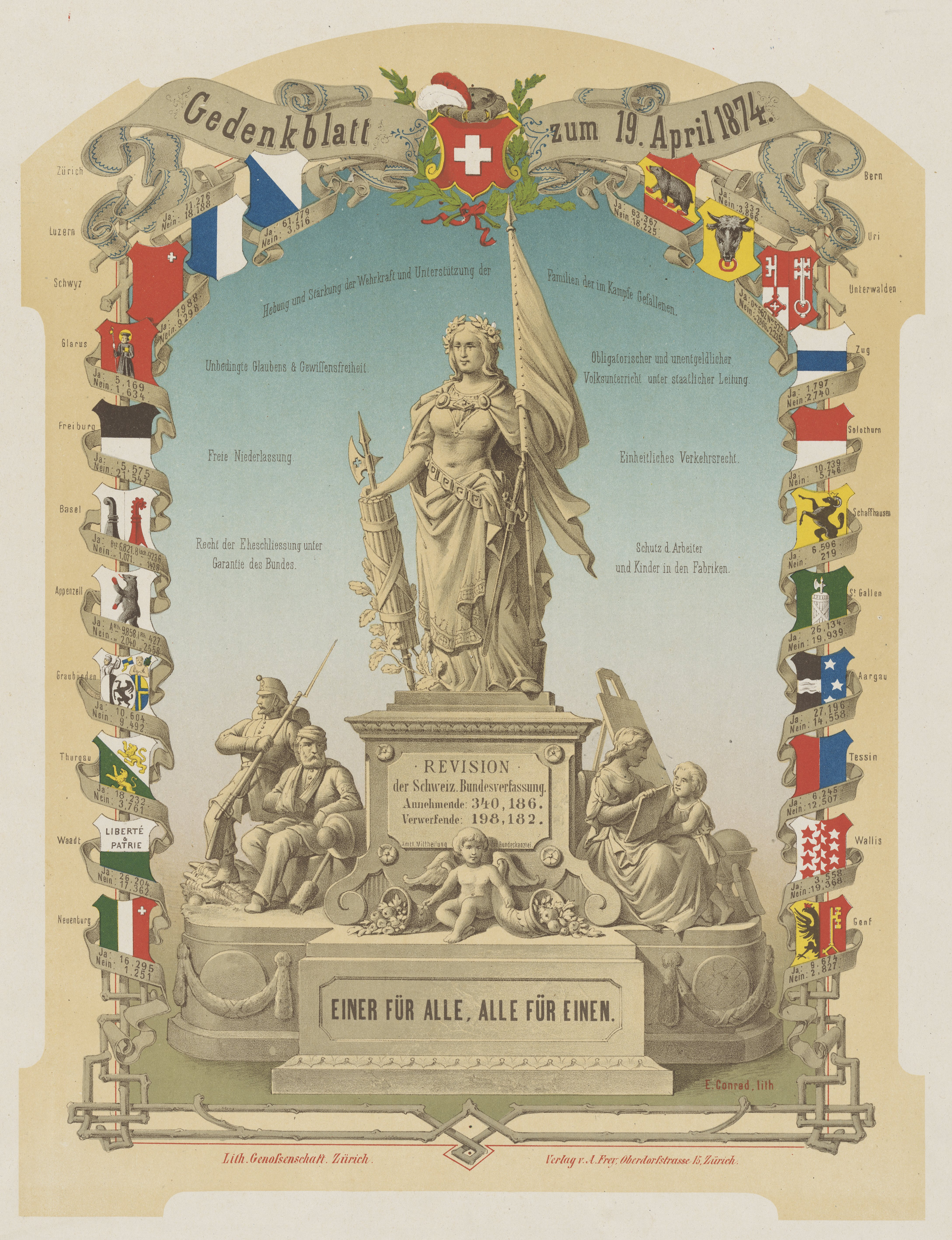
Memorial page to mark the revision of the federal constitution of 1874, featuring the motto "Einer für alle, alle für einen" ("One for all, all for one")

The Federal Constitution of the Swiss Confederation (SR 10) (Note: German: Bundesverfassung der Schweizerischen Eidgenossenschaft (BV); French: Constitution fédérale de la Confédération suisse (Cst.); Italian: Costituzione federale della Confederazione Svizzera (Cost.); Romansh: Constituziun federala da la Confederaziun svizra)) of 18 April 1999 (SR 101) is the third and current federal constitution of Switzerland.

It establishes the Swiss Confederation as a federal republic of 26 cantons (states). The document contains a catalogue of individual and popular rights (including the right to call for popular referendums on federal laws and constitutional amendments), delineates the responsibilities of the cantons and the Confederation and establishes the federal authorities of government.

The Constitution was adopted by a referendum on 18 April 1999, in which a majority of the people and the cantons voted in favour. It replaced the prior federal constitution of 1874, which it was intended to bring up to date without changing its substance.

== History ==
Prior to 1798, the Swiss Confederacy was a confederation of independent states, not a federal state; as such it was based on treaties rather than a constitution. The Helvetic Republic of 1798–1803 had a constitution largely drawn up by Peter Ochs, in 1803 replaced by the Act of Mediation, which was in turn replaced by the Federal Treaty of 1815, which restored the Confederacy, while the individual cantons drew up cantonal constitutions, in most respects based on the Ancien Régime of the 18th century, but with notable liberal innovations in the constitutions of the new cantons of St. Gallen, Aargau, Thurgau, Ticino, Vaud and Geneva. The new cantonal constitutions in many cases served as precedents for the later federal constitution.

Following the French July Revolution in 1830, a number of large assemblies were held calling for new cantonal constitutions. The modifications to the cantonal constitutions made during this period of "Regeneration" remains the basis of the current-day cantonal constitutions. Vaud introduced the legislative popular initiative in 1846. Berne introduced the legislative optional referendum in the same year.

The political crisis of the Regeneration period culminated in the Sonderbund War of November 1847. As a result of the Sonderbund War, Switzerland was transformed into a federal state, with a constitution promulgated on 12 September 1848. This constitution provided for the cantons' sovereignty, as long as this did not impinge on the Federal Constitution. The creation of a bicameral assembly was consciously inspired by the United States Constitution, the National Council and Council of States corresponding to the House of Representatives and Senate, respectively.

In a partial revision of 1891, the "right of initiative" was introduced, under which a certain number of voters could make a request to amend a constitutional article, or even to introduce a new article into the constitution. This mechanism is called federal popular initiative. Thus, partial revisions of the constitution could – from this time onward – be made at any time.

Twelve such changes were made in the period of 1893 to 1994 (with no changes during the thirty-year period of 1950–1980):

- 20 August 1893: prohibition of shechita without anesthetization
- 5 July 1908: prohibition of absinthe
- 13 October 1918: proportional representation in the Swiss National Council
- 21 March 1920: prohibition of casino gambling
- 30 January 1921: mandatory referendum on international treaties signed by Switzerland
- 2 December 1928: exemptions on the ban on casinos
- 11 September 1949: provisions for the optional referendum procedure
- 28 November 1982: provisions against overpricing
- 6 December 1987: protection of wetlands (against the proposed Rothenthurm military training area)
- 23 September 1990: moratorium on nuclear power plants
- 26 September 1993: Swiss National Day
- 20 February 1994: protection of the Alpine landscape (limitations on trans-alpine traffic)

The Federal Constitution was wholly revised for the second time in the 1990s, when the new version was approved by popular and cantonal vote on 18 April 1999. It came into force on 1 January 2000. The 1999 Constitution of Switzerland consists of a preamble and six parts, which together make up 196 articles.

It provides an explicit provision for nine fundamental rights, which up until then had only been discussed and debated in the Federal Court. It also provides for greater details in tax laws. The Constitution of 1999 has been changed by popular initiative ten times in the period of 2002 to 2014, as follows:

- 3 March 2002: accession to the United Nations
- 8 February 2004: indefinite confinement of dangerous sexual offenders
- 27 November 2005: restrictions on the use of genetically modified organisms in agriculture
- 30 November 2008: abolition of the statute of limitations for child sexual abuse
- 29 November 2009: prohibition of minarets
- 28 November 2010: deportation of convicted foreign citizens
- 11 March 2012: limitation on building permits for holiday homes
- 3 March 2013: provisions for the right of shareholders in Swiss public companies to determine executive pay
- 9 February 2014: principle of immigration quotas
- 8 May 2014: prohibition of convicted child sex offenders from working with minors

== Constitutional provisions ==
=== Preamble and Title 1 General Provisions ===
The preamble and the first title of the Constitution determine the general outlines of Switzerland as a democratic federal republic of 26 cantons governed by the rule of law.

The preamble opens with a solemn invocation of God in continuance of Swiss constitutional tradition. It is a mandate to the State authorities by the Swiss people and cantons, as the Confederation's constituent powers, to adhere to the values listed in the preamble, which include "liberty and democracy, independence and peace in solidarity and openness towards the world". The latter provision about the "openness" present a drastic contrast with the previous Swiss constitutions which were mostly oriented toward the internal isolationism. The new preamble also provides a provision about responsibility before and the rights of the future generations of the people of Switzerland.

The general provisions contained in Title 1 (articles 1–6) define the characteristic traits of the Swiss state on all of its three levels of authority: federal, cantonal and municipal. They contain an enumeration of the constituent cantons, affirm cantonal sovereignty within the bounds of the Constitution and list the national languages – German, French, Italian and Romansh. They also commit the state to the principles of obedience to law, proportionality, good faith and respect for international law, an explicit claim for subsidiarity, before closing with a reference to individual responsibility.

=== Title 2 Fundamental Rights, Citizenship and Social Goals ===
Title 2 contains the Constitution's bill of rights and consists of 35 articles. The 1874 constitution contained only a limited number of fundamental rights, and some of them grew less significant as the 20th century wore on, such as the right to a decent burial guaranteed in article 53 of the old constitution. In consequence, the Swiss Federal Supreme Court's extensive case law developed an array of implicit or "unwritten" fundamental rights, drawing upon the case law of the European Court of Human Rights and applying the fundamental rights guaranteed in the European Convention on Human Rights (ECHR), which Switzerland ratified in 1974.

In the course of the 1999 constitutional revision, the Federal Assembly decided to codify that case law in the form of a comprehensive bill of rights, which is substantially congruent with the rights guaranteed in the ECHR, the Universal Declaration of Human Rights and the International Covenant on Civil and Political Rights.

Title 2 also covers the essential rules on the acquisition of Swiss citizenship and of the exercise of political rights. Furthermore, it contains a number of not directly enforceable "social goals" which the state shall strive to ensure, including the availability of social security, health care and housing.

Title 2 refers to Swiss people as "women and men of Switzerland" as a sign of acknowledging gender discrimination in the past (Switzerland became the second to last country in Europe that granted, in 1971, suffrage to women). The new Constitution also eliminated several archaic provisions from the previous Constitution, including a tax on brides moving into the bridegroom's household, a prohibition on cantons maintaining military forces of more than 300 personnel, a mandate requiring cantons to provide mutual military assistance, and the prohibition of absinthe.

=== Title 3 Confederation, Cantons and Communes ===
Title 3 describes in the first chapter the relationships between the Confederation, the cantons and the communes. The cantons retain their own constitutions, but in the case of contradiction the Federal Constitution prevails.

The second chapter declares the federal power about areas that require uniform regulation, such as relations with foreign states, security, national and civil defence, general aspects about education, research, culture, the aspects about environment and spatial planning, public construction works and transport, energy and communications, economy in general, concerns about housing, employment, social security and health, about the rights of residence and settlement of foreign nationals, and finally about the responsibility regarding the civil and criminal law, weights and measures.

The third chapter clarifies general financial aspects, in particular taxation.

=== Title 4 The People and the Cantons ===
Title 4 clarifies fundamental political rights and in particular the rights for initiatives and referendums.

=== Title 5 Federal Authorities ===
Title 5 regulates the function and responsibilities of the Federal Government. It provides for three branches of the government represented by three bodies: the Federal Assembly (two chambers, representing the Legislative power), Federal Council (the Executive power), and the Federal Court (the Judicial power). The main differences compared to the previous constitution deal with the supervisory activity of the Federal Court of the Federal Legislature.

=== Title 6 Revision of the Federal Constitution and Transitional Provisions ===
Title 6 regulates the revisions of the Federal Constitution as well as transitional provisions.

== See also ==
- Federal intervention in Switzerland
- Referendum
- Schubert Jurisprudence
- Special Provisions
- Swiss law
- Switzerland as a federal state
- Voting in Switzerland

== Bibliography ==
- Bernhard Ehrenzeller, Philipp Mastronardi, Rainer J. Schweizer, Klaus A. Vallender (eds.) (2002). Die schweizerische Bundesverfassung, Kommentar (in German). ISBN 3-905455-70-6.. Cited as Ehrenzeller.
- Andreas Kley: "Federal Constitution" in German, French and Italian in the online Historical Dictionary of Switzerland, 3 May 2011.
