= Federalism in Switzerland =

Aspect of modern Swiss history

The rise of federalism in Switzerland began on 12 September 1848, with the creation of a federal constitution in response to a 27-day civil war, the Sonderbundskrieg.

The 1848 constitution represented the first time, other than when the short-lived Helvetic Republic had been imposed, that the Swiss had a central government instead of being simply a collection of autonomous cantons bound by treaties.

== Sonderbund War ==
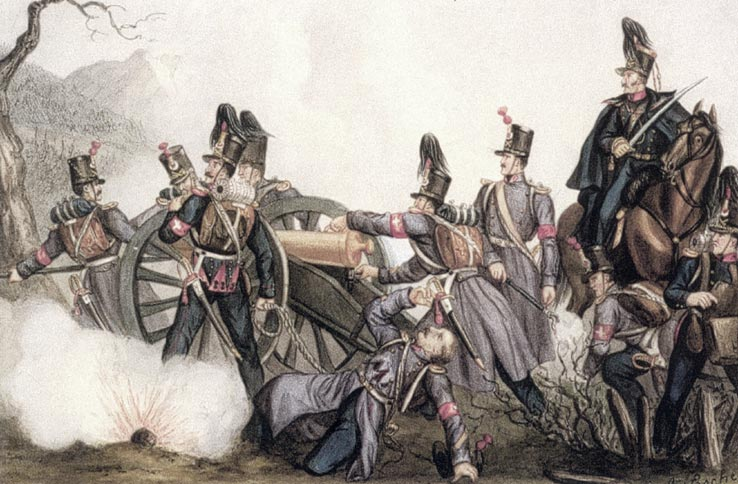
The federal troops during the Sonderbund war

In 1847, the period of Swiss history known as Restoration ended with a war between the conservative Roman Catholic and the liberal Protestant cantons (the Sonderbundskrieg). The conflict between the Catholic and Protestant cantons had existed since the Reformation; in the 19th century the Protestant population had a majority. The Sonderbund (German: separate alliance) was concluded after the Radical Party had taken power in Switzerland and had, thanks to the Protestant majority of cantons, taken measures against the Catholic Church such as the closure of monasteries and convents in Aargau in 1841. When Lucerne, in retaliation, recalled the Jesuits the same year, groups of armed radicals ("Freischärler") invaded the canton. The invasion caused a revolt, mostly because rural cantons were strongholds of ultramontanism.

The Sonderbund was in violation of the Federal Treaty of 1815, §6, which forbade separate alliances, and the Radical majority in the Tagsatzung dissolved it on 21 October 1847. A confederate army was raised against the members of the Sonderbund, composed of soldiers of all the other states except Neuchâtel and Appenzell Innerrhoden, which stayed neutral. Ticino, while a Catholic canton, did not join the Sonderbund and fought alongside the Protestants.

The war lasted for less than a month, causing fewer than 100 casualties. Apart from small riots, this was the last armed conflict on Swiss territory.

At the end of the Sonderbund War, the Diet debated a new federal constitution drawn up by Johann Conrad Kern (1808–1888) of Thurgau and Henri Druey (1790–1855) of Vaud. In the summer of 1848 this constitution was accepted by fifteen and a half cantons, with Uri, Schwyz, Unterwalden, Valais, Ticino and Appenzell Innerrhoden opposing. The new constitution was declared on 12 September 1848.

== Federal Constitution ==
=== 1848 Constitution ===
The Federal Constitution of 1848

The new constitution created, for the first time, Swiss citizenship in addition to cantonal citizenship. A federal central government was set up to which the cantons gave up certain parts of their sovereign rights. The Federal Assembly was made up of two houses: Council of States (Ständerat), composed of two deputies from each canton (44 members at the time) and the National Council (Nationalrat) made up of deputies elected three years, in the proportion of one for every 20,000 citizens or fraction over 10,000 from each canton. The Federal Council or executive (Bundesrat) consisted of seven members elected by the Federal Assembly. In the 1848 Constitution, the Federal Council was granted the "supreme executive and directorial authority of the Confederation". Each member of the Federal Council heads one of seven executive departments. The chairman of the council also holds the title of President of the Swiss Confederation for a one-year term, with the position rotating among the members of the Federal Council.

The judiciary (Bundesgericht) was made up of eleven members elected for three years by the Federal Assembly. The Bundesgericht was chiefly confined to civil cases in which the Confederation was a party, but also took in great political crimes. All constitutional questions are however reserved for the Federal Assembly.

A federal university and a polytechnic school were to be founded. All capitulations were forbidden in the future. All cantons were required to treat Swiss citizens who belonged to one of the Christian confessions like their own citizens. Previously, citizens of one canton regarded citizens of the others as the citizens of foreign countries. All Christians were guaranteed the exercise of their religion but the Jesuits and similar religious orders were not to be received in any canton. German, French and Italian were recognized as national languages.

Although there was now a fully organized central government, Switzerland was a very decentralized federation. Most authority remained with the cantons, including all powers not explicitly granted to the federal government. One of the first acts of the Federal Assembly was to exercise the power given them of determining the home of the Federal authorities (the de facto capital of the newly created confederation), and on 28 November 1848 Bern was chosen. The first Federal Council sat on 16 November 1848, composed entirely of Radicals (predecessors of the Free Democratic Party).

Some of the first acts of the new Federal Assembly were to unify and standardize daily life in the country. In 1849 a uniform postal service was established. In 1850 a single currency was imposed to replace the cantonal currencies, while all customs between cantons were abolished. In 1851 the telegraph was organized, while all weights and measures were unified. In 1868 the metric system was allowed and in 1875 declared obligatory and universal. In 1854 roads and canals taken in hand were taken under federal control. The Federal Polytechnic wasn't opened until 1855 in Zurich, though the Federal university authorized by the new constitution has not yet been set up.

In 1859, Reisläuferei (mercenary service) was outlawed, with the exception of the Vatican guard.

In 1866 the rights granted only to Christians (free movement and freedom of religion) under the 1848 Constitution were extended to all Swiss regardless of religion.

=== 1874 Revised Constitution ===
From 1848 onwards the cantons continually revised their constitutions, with most including the introduction of the referendum, by which laws made by the cantonal legislature may (facultative referendum) or must (obligatory referendum) be submitted to the people for their approval. It was therefore only natural that attempts should be made to revise the federal constitution of 1848 in a democratic and centralizing sense, for it had been provided that the Federal Assembly, on its own initiative or on the written request of 50,000 Swiss electors, could submit the question of revision to a popular vote. The first attempt at a revision in 1872 was defeated by a small majority, owing to the efforts of the anti-centralizing party. Finally, however, another draft was preferred, and on the 19 April 1874, the new constitution was accepted by the people – 14 1/2 cantons against 7 1/2 (those of 1848 without Ticino, but with Fribourg and Lucerne).

The Constitution of 1874 further strengthened the federal power. The revised Constitution included three major points. First, a system of free elementary education was set up, under the superintendence of the Confederation, but managed by the cantons. Second, a man settling in another canton was, after three months (instead of two years in the 1848 Constitution), given all cantonal and communal rights (formerly only cantonal rights were granted). Finally, the referendum was introduced in its "facultative" form; i.e., all federal laws must be submitted to popular vote on the demand of 30,000 Swiss citizens or of eight cantons. The Initiative (i.e., the right of compelling the legislature to consider a certain subject or bill) was not introduced into the Federal Constitution until 1891 (when it was given to 50,000 Swiss citizens) and then only as to a partial (not a total) revision of that constitution.

== Industrialisation and economic growth ==
The 1847 to 1914 period saw the development of the Swiss railway network. The Schweizerische Nordbahn (SNB) society opened the first railway line on Swiss soil in 1847, connecting Zürich and Baden. The Gotthard Rail Tunnel was completed in 1881.

The Swiss watchmaking industry has its origins in the 18th century, but boomed during the 19th century, turning the village of La Chaux-de-Fonds into an industrial center. Rapid urban growth also enlarged Zürich, which incorporated its industrial suburb Aussersihl into the municipality in 1891.

Banking emerged as a significant factor in Swiss economy with the foundation of the Union Bank of Switzerland in 1862, the Swiss Bank Corporation in 1872.

The golden age of alpinism in the 1850s–60s laid the foundation to the tourism industry.

== See also ==
- Federalism in Germany
- Enlargement of Switzerland
- Alemannic separatism
- Augustin Keller
- Politics of Switzerland
- Federal Council
