= Joseph Leonz Andermatt =

Swiss general

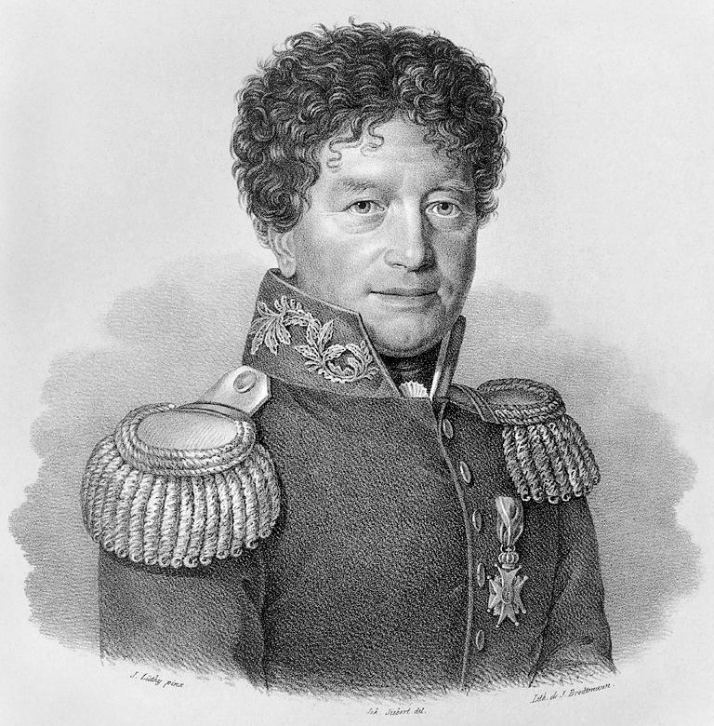
- Lithograph by Joseph Brodtmann, c. 1818
- Born: 5 May 1740; Baar, Switzerland
- Died: 2 November 1817 (aged 77) Baar, Switzerland
- Allegiance: France (c. 1758–1763, 1769–1792); Spain (1763–1768); Sardinia (1793–1797); Swiss Confederation (1798); Helvetic Republic (1798–1802)
- Rank: General (Helvetic Republic)
- Conflicts: Seven Years' War; Nancy affair French Revolutionary Wars; Stecklikrieg
- Awards: Knight of the Order of Saint Louis

Joseph Leonz Andermatt (5 May 1740 – 2 November 1817) was a Swiss mercenary and military leader who played a prominent role during the Helvetic Republic (1798–1803).

== Biography ==
Andermatt was born on 5 May 1740 in Baar, in the Swiss canton of Zug, the son of Joseph Leonz Andermatt and Katharina Luthiger. His father was a mercenary captain in Neapolitan service who later served as ammann of Zug and landvogt of the Upper Freie Ämter. Andermatt became a mercenary in the service of France around 1758 and took part in the Seven Years' War. He was in Spanish service from 1763 to 1768, then became captain of a company in French service in 1769. His long life of garrison duty was often interrupted by stays on his estates in Baar.

In 1790, Andermatt took part in the suppression of the Nancy Mutiny, in which his own regiment was implicated, which earned him the title of Knight of the Order of Saint Louis. He returned to Zug in September 1792 (following the overthrow of the French monarchy), raised mercenary troops and entered Sardinian service as a lieutenant-colonel in 1793. Andermatt fought Revolutionary France in the War of the First Coalition, rising to the rank of colonel, and became commander of a battalion in 1796. In 1797, following Sardinia's defeat in the Italian campaign, Andermatt was arrested for refusing to fight for France against Austria; he returned to Zug the following year.

Andermatt organized and commanded Zug's militia during French invasion of Switzerland in the spring of 1798. After a defeat at Hägglingen, he became a supporter of the French-allied Helvetic Republic and, with French help, was reimbursed the fines his father had been forced to pay in 1764 due to a political conflict. In 1799, Andermatt served in the War of the Second Coalition as a brigade general of the Helvetic Legion in Piedmont, during which he was captured by the Austrians. He was released in 1800 and was appointed a brigade colonel of the Helvetic Republic.

In the summer of 1801, Andermatt served as a government commissioner in the Graubünden. He commanded federalist troops in a successful coup d'état against the Helvetic government in October 1801. At the same time, he was promoted to general and appointed senator for the canton of Zug (until 1803). In late 1801, Andermatt joined the War Department in an advisory capacity, but soon defected the federalist camp, supported the unitarian coup d'état of April 1802, and led government troops against federalist rebels in the Stecklikrieg. He represented the canton of Zug at a conference in Paris, hosted by First Consul of France Napoleon Bonaparte, that brought about the Act of Mediation and the abolition of the Helvetic Republic. Andermatt then retired to his estates in Baar. He died on 2 November 1817, aged 77.
