= Werner Andermatt =

Swiss painter

- Born: July 28, 1916; Zug, Switzerland
- Died: May 29, 2013 (aged 96); Lucerne, Switzerland
- Education: Kunstgewerbeschule in Lucerne, Académie de la Grande Chaumière (Paris), Academy Wabel (Zurich)
- Known for: Painting, Graphic arts

Werner Andermatt (28 July 1916 – 29 May 2013) was a Swiss painter.

Andermatt was born in July 1916 in Zug. From 1935 to 1938, he studied at the Kunstgewerbeschule in Lucerne (Lucerne University of Applied Sciences and Arts), and then trained as a teacher of drawing and graphic arts. He studied in Paris at (Académie de la Grande Chaumière), and Zurich (Academy Wabel). From 1938 to 1948, he worked as a graphic artist and book designer. In 1948, he started working as a teacher of figure drawing and graphic arts at the Kunstgewerbeschule Luzern, and from 1950 to 1981, he served as its director. He was also a member of the GSMBA (Society of Swiss Painters, Sculptors and Architects), of Central Switzerland.

Andermatt lived and worked in Lucerne. He was married for 40 years, and had four sons and one daughter. He died in May 2013 at the age of 96.

== Awards ==
- 1986 Culture in central Switzerland
- 1996 Badge of the city of Lucerne
