= Stecklikrieg =

War in Switzerland

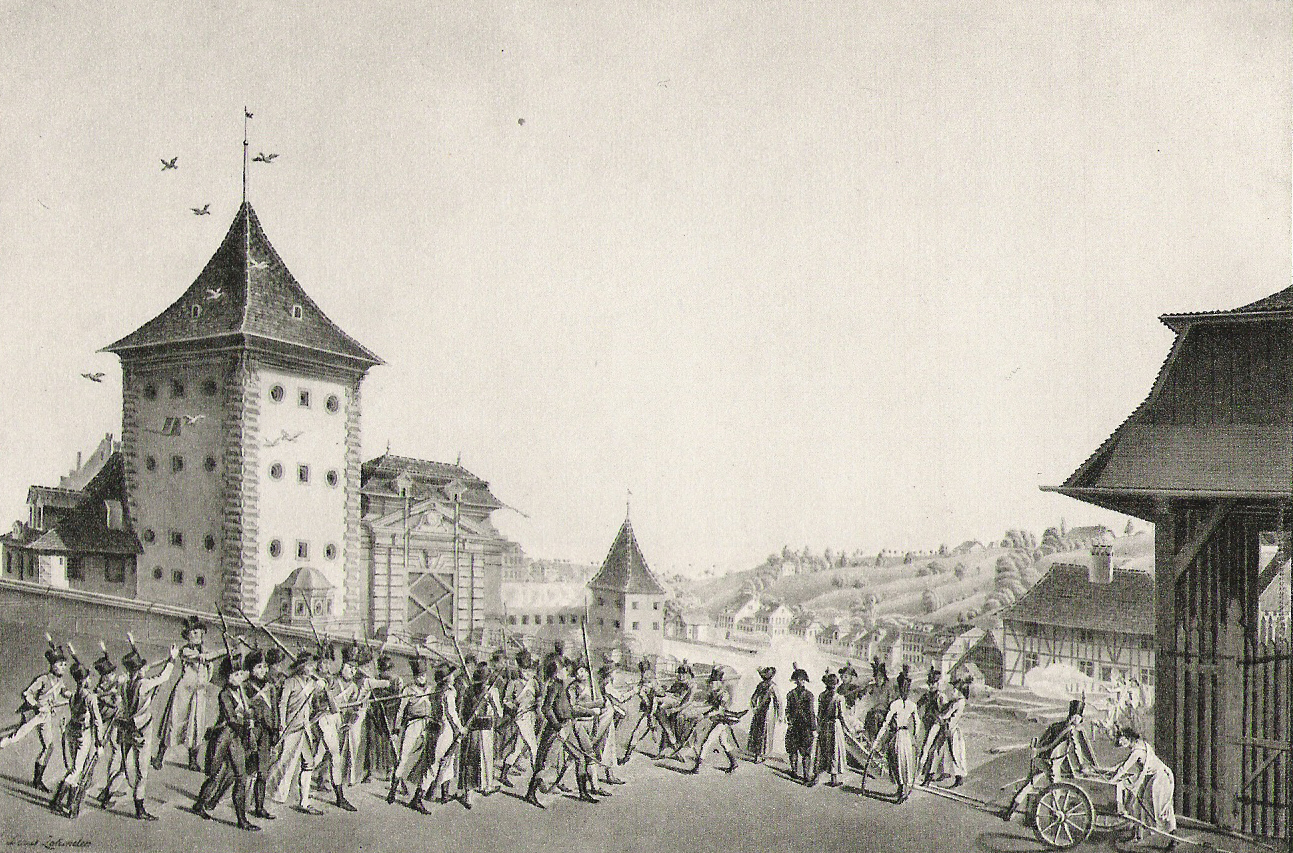
- The death of Lieutenant Rudolf von Werdt during the siege of Bern on 18 September 1802, an episode of the Stecklikrieg. Drawing by Karl Ludwig Zehender, 1805.
Date	August – 26 October 1802
Location	Helvetic Republic
Result	Federalist victory: Collapse of the Helvetic Republic; New French military occupation; Act of Mediation (10 March 1803)

Belligerents
Helvetic Republic Supported by: France	Federalists: Zürich; Bern; Lucerne; Uri; Schwyz; Unterwalden; Glarus; Solothurn; Appenzell; Aargau

Commanders and leaders
Johann Rudolf Dolder; Joseph Leonz Andermatt; Michel Ney	Alois von Reding; Niklaus Franz von Bachmann

The Stecklikrieg ("War of Sticks") was a civil war in Switzerland in 1802 that resulted in the collapse of the Helvetic Republic, the renewed French occupation of Switzerland and ultimately the Act of Mediation dictated by Napoleon Bonaparte on 19 February 1803. The conflict pitted federalist insurgents, mostly drawn from the rural population, against government forces of the unitary Helvetic Republic. The term Stäckli, or "wooden club," from which the conflict draws its name, refers to the improvised weaponry of the insurgents.

== Background ==
Cantons of the Helvetic Republic at the time of the Stecklikrieg

Following the Treaty of Lunéville of 1801, French troops suddenly withdrew from Switzerland in late July 1802, resulting in rapid destabilization of the country. This instability reached a head in August, with an open rebellion of Swiss federalists against the unitary Helvetic Republic. The revolt originated in Central Switzerland and was centered around the cities of Zürich and Bern, the canton of Baden, as well as rural parts of the Swiss Plateau in the cantons Aargau and Solothurn. It would eventually spread to most of the Republic's nineteen cantons.

== Conflict ==
The war began with an engagement at Rengg Pass on 28 August, where government troops were defeated by federalists from Nidwalden, followed by unsuccessful artillery attacks on Zürich from 10 to 13 September by government troops. Rebel forces from Bern, Solothurn and Aargau soon captured Bern, which was also briefly shelled. The Helvetic government, headed by Landamman Johann Rudolf Dolder, capitulated militarily on September 18, but was able to negotiate a retreat from Bern to Lausanne before collapsing entirely.

With the exception of Léman and Fribourg, executive power was restored to the cantonal governments and to a Federal Diet in Schwyz led by Alois von Reding. On 30 September, First Consul Napoleon Bonaparte issued the proclamation of Saint-Cloud, calling for a return to constitutional order and inviting both parties to a conciliatory conference in Paris, known as the "Helvetic Consulta". Niklaus Franz von Bachmann, commander-in-chief of the federal army, inflicted a final defeat on the Helvetic army at Faoug on 3 October. Bonaparte then launched a military intervention under General Michel Ney to pacify the country, disarm the federalists and restore the Helvetic Republic. Under French pressure, the Federal Diet at Schwyz announced its dissolution on 26 October, bringing an end to the Stecklikrieg.

With the more liberal order of the Helvetic Republic, anti-Jewish sentiment rose, as accusations emerged that Jews were unfairly profiting from the unpopular new order. This came to a head on the 21st of September 1802, in the so-called “Zwetschgenkrieg” or plum war. An armed horde of 800 farmers, craftsmen and some patricians assaulted the Surbtal Jews, looting and destroying their homes and belongings. The attack was not entirely unexpected, tensions having built up over several days, and the Christian inhabitants of Endingen and Lengnau were largely unaffected. The Jews did not receive compensation for the damages, and the perpetrators did not face any consequences.

== Aftermath ==
Napoleon was concerned that the instability of Switzerland could infect Europe at large, and was authorized to negotiate a settlement between the feuding sides. His Act of Mediation made concessions to the demands of the insurgents, abandoning the centralist structure of the Helvetic Republic in favor of a more federalist approach. He likewise stated the natural state of Switzerland was federal and that attempts to force any other system upon them were unwise.

=== British response ===
France's intervention in the conflict violated the Treaty of Amiens, and was cited as a casus belli by Britain in its declaration of war against France on 18 May 1803. French involvement within the internal affairs of the Swiss was a key example of Britain's worry that Napoleon intended to destroy their influence in continental affairs. Though the British often attempted to stay removed from the internal struggles of the Continent, the actions of Napoleon's France upset the European balance of power and damaged British trade in the region. While the Act of Mediation enforced by French intervention did not particularly upset the Swiss order, in fact restoring much of pre-existing traditions and forms of Swiss government from before the 1798 French invasion, it was a technical violation of the Treaty of Amiens, which prohibited such foreign meddling by France.

== See also ==
- Switzerland in the Napoleonic era
