= Tagsatzung =

Legislative and executive council of the Swiss Confederacy

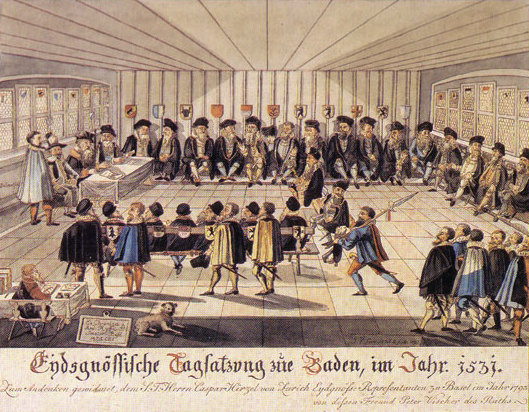
Tagsatzung of 1531 in Baden (1790s drawing).

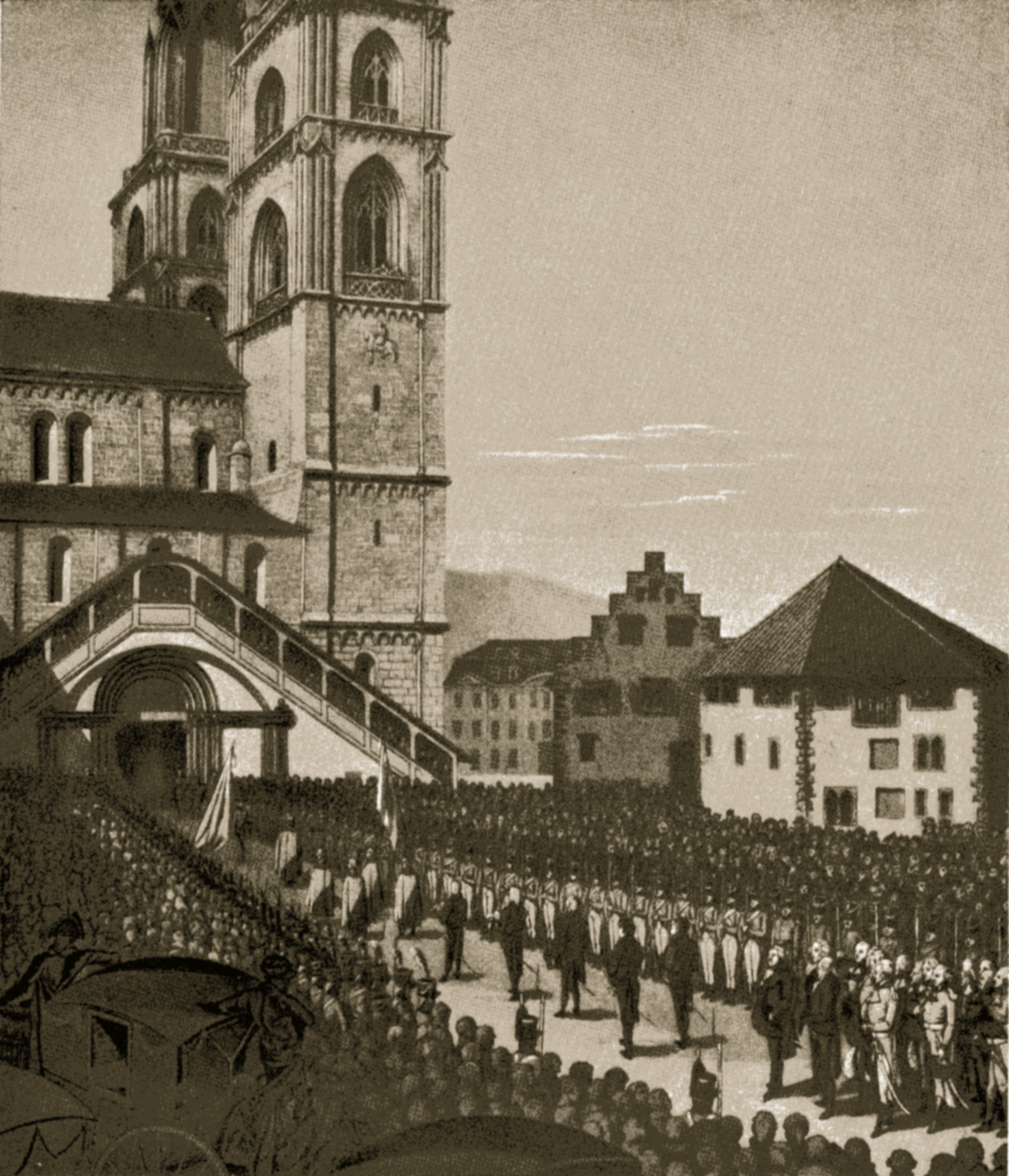
Tagsatzung of 1807 at Grossmünster in Zurich

The Federal Diet of Switzerland (German: Tagsatzung, IPA: [ˈtaːkˌzatsʊŋ]; French: Diète fédérale; Italian: Dieta federale) was the legislative and executive council of the Old Swiss Confederacy and existed in various forms from the beginnings of Swiss independence until the formation of the Swiss federal state in 1848.

The Diet was a meeting of delegates from the individual cantons. It was the most wide-reaching political institution of the Old Swiss Confederacy, but its power was very limited, as the cantons were essentially sovereign.

While the composition and functions of the Federal Diet had changed and evolved since its founding in the 15th century, it was most notably reorganised during the Revolutionary and Napoleonic period. The understanding of the Federal Diet can be broken down into three main periods: before the French invasion in 1798, the period of the French invasion and the Act of Mediation, and from its restructuring by the Federal Treaty (Bundesvertrag) of 7 August 1815 to its dissolution after the Sonderbund War in 1848.

== Traditional organisation ==
Organised as a Diet since 1500, the seat of the Swiss legislature was called the Federal Diet. This was not the sole source of authority in the loosely joined country, as each canton had relatively independent diets as well. Though a representative body, it differed from modern constitutional assemblies as its member were drawn almost exclusively from the picked interest of the landed and mercantile elite. The presiding canton of the Federal Diet was known as the Vorort and was usually the canton which had called the Diet. The Diet was held in varying locations, with Zurich becoming increasingly important following the 16th century. The last three presiding cantons before the French invasion were Bern, Lucerne, and Zurich.

== Changes following 1798 ==
Following the invasion and victory of the French Republican forces, the Old Swiss Confederation was disbanded and replaced by the Helvetic Republic. This was a more centralized form of government than the previous and it was widely opposed as revoking the traditional liberties of local powers. Opposition was particularly fierce among the Catholic population, for whom the French imposed government was associated with the radical anti-clericalism of the French Revolution. This opposition eventually led to the Stecklikrieg, which pitted a Swiss rebellion against the forces of the Helvetic Republic. The opposition was successful in forcing the Helvetic Republic to accepting the French negotiated Acts of Mediation in 1803. These acts secured the federal, decentralized nature of Switzerland.

== End of the Federal Diet ==
Switzerland was organized according to the terms of the Acts of Mediation under the defeat of the French Empire in 1815. The "Long Diet" had been in session for over a year until 1815, when the Congress of Vienna decided the shape which Europe would take following the Coalition's victory. The Swiss government maintained its federal structure, though no longer under the forms of the Acts of Mediation and coordinated by a renamed Federal Assembly. This is the system which would govern the Swiss for over three decades, seeing the addition of new, French-speaking cantons. The system showed its weaknesses in 1845, when a league of Catholic cantons joined in opposition to Federal authority and formed the Sonderbund League in 1845. This was the beginnings of a civil war, which lasted through 1848 and saw the Federal forces victorious. Following their victory, a new constitution was adopted and the Federal Assembly of Switzerland was created in its modern form. Bern was chosen as the 'federal city,' or Bundesstadt, in a deliberate avoidance of the term 'capital city,' or Hauptstadt. In its modern form, the Federal Assembly is a true representative body which elects its members according to the votes of the citizens of each canton.

== See also ==
- List of presidents of the Swiss Diet
- Landammann
- Landsgemeinde
