= List of presidents of the Swiss Diet =

This is a list of presidents of the Diet ("Tagsatzung") of the Swiss Confederation (before 1848).

Several statesmen served as president multiple times. Hans von Reinhard, also known simply as Hans Reinhard, was a four-time president who served in 1814–1815, 1816, 1822, and 1828.

For the period since the creation of Switzerland as a federal state in 1848, the List of Presidents of the Swiss Confederation details the yearly President of the Confederation.

== 1814–1848 ==
- Hans von Reinhard, 1814–1815
- Hans Konrad von Escher vom Luchs-1814
- Johann Konrad Finsler-1814
- David von Wyss II-1814-1815
- Hans von Reinhard, 1816
- Niklaus Rudolf von Wattenwyl-1817
- Niklaus Friedrich von Mülinen-1818
- Josef Karl Xaver Leopold Leodegar Amrhyn-1819
- Vinzenz Rüttimann-1820
- David von Wyss II-1821
- Hans von Reinhard, 1822
- Niklaus Rudolf von Wattenwyl-1823
- Niklaus Friedrich von Mülinen-1824
- Josef Karl Xaver Leopold Leodegar Amrhyn-1825
- Vinzenz Rüttimann-1826
- David von Wyss II-1827
- Hans von Reinhard, 1828
- Niklaus Rudolf von Wattenwyl-1829
- Emanuel Friedrich von Fischer-1830
- Josef Karl Xaver Leopold Leodegar Amrhyn-1831
- Eduard Pfyffer von Altishoven-1832
- Johann Jakob Hess-1833
- Konrad Melchior Hirzel-1834
- Franz Karl von Tavel-1835
- Karl Friedrich Tscharner-1836
- Josef Karl Xaver Leopold Leodegar Amrhyn-1837
- Georg Jakob Kopp-1838
- Johann Jakob Hess-1839
- Johann Konrad von Muralt-1840
- Johann Karl Friedrich Neuhaus-1841
- Karl Friedrich Tscharner-1842
- Rudolf Rüttimann-1843
- Konstantin Siegwart-Müller-1844
- Johann Heinrich Emmanuel Mousson-1845
- Jonas Furrer, (1805–1861), 1845
- Johann Ulrich Zehnder-1846
- Alexander Ludwig Funk-1847
- Ulrich Ochsenbein, (1811–1890), 1847
- Johann Rudolf Schneider-1847
- Ulrich Ochsenbein, (1811–1890), 1847–1848
- Alexander Ludwig Funk-1848

== See also ==
- List of officials of the Helvetic Republic#Presidents of the Directory (1798–1800)
- Landammann#Confederal (1802–1813)
