= Johann Rudolf Wetter =

Swiss textile merchant and manufacturer (1705–1777)

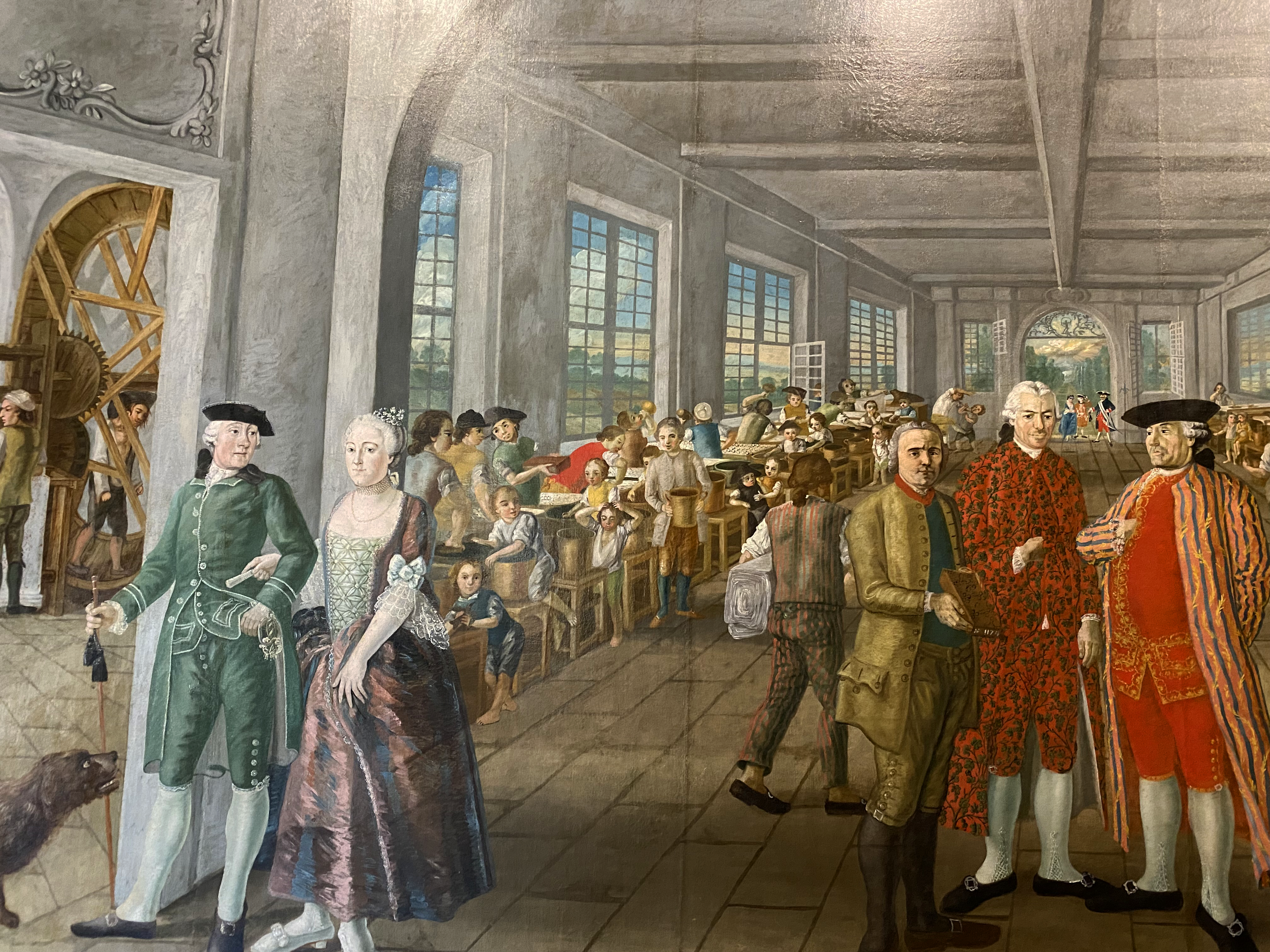
- Johann Rudolf Wetter with his wife; behind them, children at work; on the right, a worker shows the factory director a printing plate (1764)
- Born: 8 November 1705; Herisau
- Died: 21 June 1777 (aged 71); Orange
- Occupations: Textile merchant, printed cotton manufacturer
- Spouse: Jeanne Fiquet

Johann Rudolf Wetter (also known as Jean-Rodolphe Wetter; 8 November 1705, Herisau – 21 June 1777, Orange) was a Protestant Swiss textile merchant, indiennes manufacturer, and industrial pioneer in France.

== Life and family ==
Wetter was the son of Lorenz Wetter, a textile merchant and Landammann, and Barbara Ziegler, and the brother of Adrian Wetter. In 1719 he began his training at the firm Wetter, Binder & Cie in Marseille, a branch of his father's textile trading house. He later became a partner and took over its direction in 1734. In 1732 he married Jeanne Fiquet, daughter of Jean Fiquet of Montpellier. The couple had two children.

== Commercial activities in Marseille ==
Wetter expanded his product range to include dyes, spirits, and corals. His experiments with diving suits for coral fishing revealed an inclination for technical innovation. In the 1740s he turned to the manufacture of indiennes (printed cotton fabrics). Marseille was the only place in France where this activity was permitted despite the royal prohibition of 1686, though products could only be sold within the city itself and abroad. While several small enterprises producing cheap mass-market goods had emerged from around 1722, Wetter aimed at a wealthier clientele. With the help of an English specialist, he introduced new processes and his manufactory, located on the banks of the Huveaune river in the Marseille suburb of Saint-Marcel, quickly grew into a large enterprise. Its distribution area extended across the entire Mediterranean region, to Argentina, Colombia, and the Caribbean. In West Africa, printed cottons and other fabrics were frequently exchanged for enslaved people, forced to work in European colonies in the Americas and the Caribbean. Wetter also held shares in a soap works in Marseille, a textile printing workshop in Aubagne, and silver mines at Guadalcanal in Andalusia. His activities led to excessive debt, which resulted, among other things, in the liquidation of the Aubagne workshop in autumn 1755.

== Manufacture at Orange ==
He moved to Paris, but returned to southern France in 1757, settling in Orange, where he founded a textile manufactory under the name JR Wetter et sa Compagnie, with the backing of Parisian and Marseillais investors. Under the technical direction of Pierre Pignet, an experienced fabric printer from Geneva, and following the lifting of the prohibition on printing indiennes in 1759, the enterprise grew rapidly, employing 398 workers by 1762 and nearly 600 by 1764.

Joseph Gabriel Maria Rossetti immortalised all stages of production in five very large-format oil paintings executed between 1764 and 1765. A hitherto little-noticed painting depicting the family coat of arms also shows the allegorical figure of Vanity — the heraldic emblem of the Wetter family — on a beach with a merchant ship at sea in the background. The manufactory also produced mass-market goods, distributed mainly through merchants in Montpellier. Luxury products were sold at the Hôtel Jabach in Paris and enjoyed such a reputation that the term toiles d'Orange became synonymous with indiennes in France. Wetter regularly placed advertisements in Parisian newspapers warning against counterfeits.

In 1766, Wetter handed over the direction of the enterprise to his sons Jean-Rodolphe and Laurent Wetter, and founded two soap factories in the Austrian Netherlands. He thereafter devoted himself primarily to studies in chemistry and medicine, as well as to music. The success of the printing workshop declined rapidly, in part because new large enterprises emerged in the main French and Spanish markets. From around 1775, Wetter's sons leased the factory to Augustin and Jérôme Party of Marseille, who kept it running at a reduced scale until around 1790. In the twenty-first century, the rue des Frères Wetter in Orange still recalls the former importance of the city's indiennes.

== Bibliography ==
=== Archival sources ===
- Musée d'art et d'histoire d'Orange, Orange. La manufacture Wetter (paintings by Joseph Gabriel Maria Rossetti; family coat of arms).
- Musée de l'Impression sur étoffes, Mulhouse. Collections, Indiennes (fabric samples from the Wetter manufactory).
- Staatsarchiv Appenzell Ausserrhoden, Herisau. Nachlässe: Familie Wetter, Herisau; letters from Lorenz Wetter senior to Lorenz Wetter junior, and letters from Lorenz Wetter to his wife and children.
- Victoria and Albert Museum, London. Textile manufactured by Jean-Rodolphe Wetter, 1766.

=== Literature ===
- Chassagne, Serge: Le coton et ses patrons. France, 1760–1840, 1991.
- Gril-Mariotte, Aziza: Jean-Rodolphe Wetter, un Suisse fabricant d'indiennes en Provence au XVIIIe siècle, mémoire de maîtrise, Université de Provence, Aix-Marseille I, 2000.
- Gril-Mariotte, Aziza: "Des fleurs d'indiennes aux roses de Lyon, la production des manufactures provençales et la peinture de fleurs enseignée dans les académies", in: L'Académie de peinture, sculpture et architecture civile et navale de Marseille 1753–1793, 56, 2018, pp. 111–128.
- Raveux, Olivier: Jean-Rodolphe Wetter, manufacturier d'indiennes à Marseille et Orange au XVIIIe siècle, 2021.
