= Adrian Wetter =

Swiss politician (1694–1764)

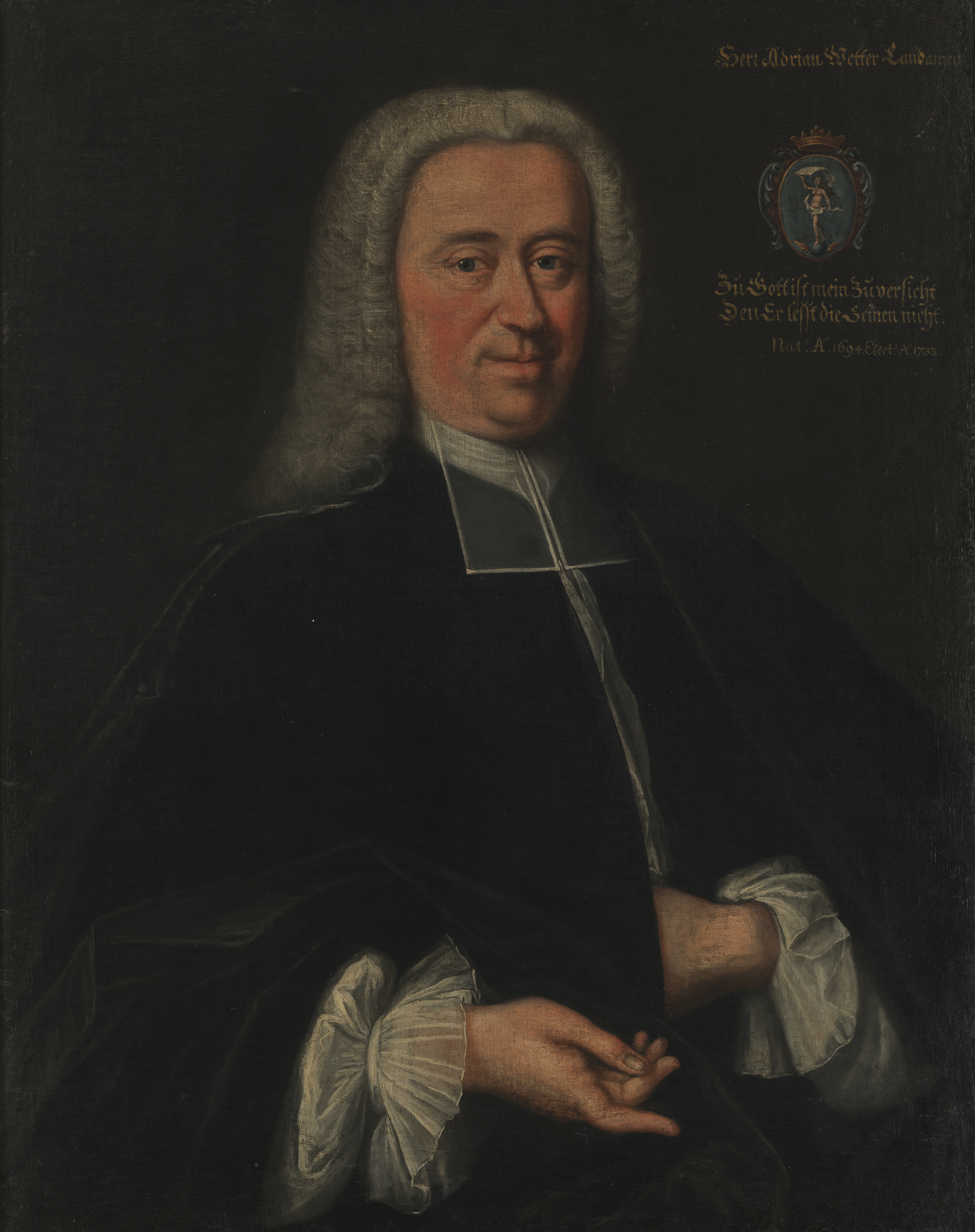
- Born: 2 September 1694; Herisau
- Died: 21 January 1764 (aged 69); Herisau
- Spouse: Elsbeth Kunkler (m. 1722)

Adrian Wetter (2 September 1694 – 21 January 1764) was a Swiss politician from Herisau, in the canton of Appenzell Ausserrhoden. He served as Landammann of the Ausserrhoden from 1733 to 1756.

== Life and career ==
Born in Herisau to Lorenz Wetter, Adrian was the brother of Johann Rudolf Wetter. In 1722 he married Elsbeth Kunkler, widow of Michael Zollikofer, Junker. He trained as a textile merchant in the family business before spending time in Italy and France from 1715 to 1716.

He held a series of offices in Herisau: Chancellor and member of the Small Council (1726–1729), major of the land (1729–1733), deputy to the Diet (1733–1753), and Landammann of the Ausserrhoden (1733–1756). As leader of the "Hards" party, which prevailed during the Landhandel, he was immediately elected Landammann and governed the final period of the unrest with skill and moderation. His ability to speak in terms accessible even to ordinary citizens led him to open the Landsgemeinde for many years, invited to do so even when it was not his turn. At times his political commitments had a detrimental effect on his business affairs.

Wetter maintained an extensive correspondence with prominent figures both in Switzerland and abroad, and had the Zur Rose house built on the main square of Herisau.

== Bibliography ==
- AWG, 386
- Holderegger, Unternehmer, 97
