= Rüttimann =

Rüttimann is a surname. Notable people with the surname include:

- Anna Maria Rüttimann-Meyer von Schauensee (1772–1856), Swiss salonist
- Johann Jakob Rüttimann (1813–1876), Swiss politician, President of the Swiss Council of States and President of the Federal Supreme Court
- Niki Rüttimann (born 1962), Swiss cyclist
- Toni Rüttimann (born 1967), Swiss bridge engineer
- Vinzenz Rüttimann (1769–1844), Swiss politician
