= Niklaus Rudolf von Wattenwyl =

Swiss politician and officer (1760–1832)

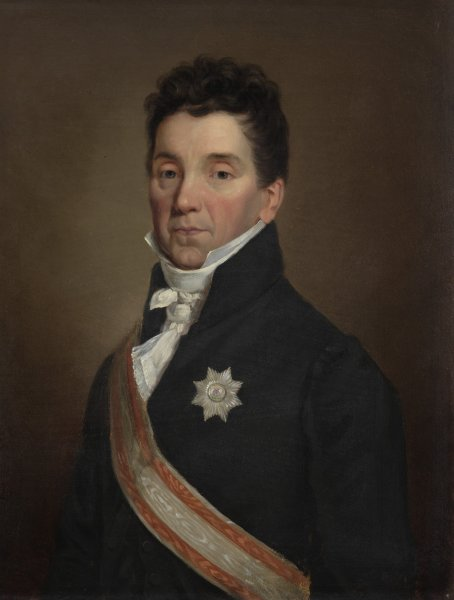
- Portrait by David Sulzer, 1825

Landammann of Switzerland
- In office 1804–1804

Landammann of Switzerland
- In office 1810–1810

Schultheiss of Bern
- In office 1803–1829

Personal details
- Born: 3 January 1760 Bern, Old Swiss Confederacy
- Died: 10 August 1832 (aged 72) Aarburg, Aargau, Switzerland
- Spouse: Louise Elisabeth Emilie von Ernst
- Parent: Rudolf Sigmund von Wattenwyl (father)
- Awards: Order of the Red Eagle

Military service
- Commands: Federal troops (1805, 1809, 1813–1814)
- Battles/wars: Stecklikrieg

Niklaus Rudolf von Wattenwyl (3 January 1760 – 10 August 1832) was a Swiss politician and military commander from Bern. From 1803 to 1829 he was Schultheiss (chief magistrate) of Bern, in alternation with others, and in 1804 and 1810 he was Landammann of Switzerland. The Federal Diet entrusted him with the supreme command of the federal troops in 1805, 1809 and 1813–1814. From 1827 he was the head of the reform party in Bern. His historical achievement lies in Bern's bloodless transition from a patrician to a popular state.

== Biography ==
Niklaus Rudolf von Wattenwyl was born on 3 January 1760 in Bern, the son of Rudolf Sigmund von Wattenwyl. He married Louise Elisabeth Emilie von Ernst, daughter of Hieronymus Friedrich von Ernst. He was educated by private tutors and at an institute in Strasbourg.

=== Military career ===
From 1776 to 1784 von Wattenwyl pursued a military career in Dutch mercenary service (Solddienst). In 1795 he was Landmajor in the regiment of Thun. In the Stecklikrieg of 1802 he commanded a battalion from the Bernese Oberland. In 1805 he became a member of the federal general staff, which was partly his creation. In 1805, 1809 and 1813–1814 the Federal Diet entrusted him with the supreme command of the federal troops. His plans to centralize the Swiss military system failed because of the resistance of the cantons and of Napoleon.

=== Political career ===
Von Wattenwyl began his political career as a member of the Grand Council of Bern from 1795 to 1798. In 1798 he belonged to the provisional government, and in 1803 he was a member of the Consulta in Paris. From 1803 to 1829 he held the office of Schultheiss in alternation with Niklaus Friedrich von Mülinen, Christoph Friedrich von Freudenreich and Emanuel Friedrich von Fischer. From 1827 he was the head of the reform party.

As early as 1830 von Wattenwyl had contacts with the Schnell liberals (Schnell'sche Liberale), to whom he offered economic freedom, tax relief and the abolition of censorship as concessions of the patriciate. On 6 December 1830 he obtained the appointment of a commission of the Grand Council to find out the wishes of the people, but he declined election to the constitutional council (Verfassungsrat). On 24 June 1831 he submitted his own draft constitution, based on a concept by Fischer. After the liberals took power, he argued in vain for loyal cooperation of the patriciate in the new state. Because he did not adapt his political aims to those of Mülinen and Abraham Friedrich von Mutach, the two other leading reformers in Bern, he was denied a part in shaping the liberal Bernese state. His historical achievement lies in Bern's bloodless transition from a patrician to a popular state.

=== Landammann of Switzerland ===
In 1804 and 1810, as Landammann of Switzerland, von Wattenwyl directed Swiss foreign policy, which had little room for maneuver. His relationship with Napoleon was cool. Diplomatic missions to Napoleon in Chambéry, Munich and Paris show him as a respected diplomat, but he lost the fight against the Continental System. His hard line against the Zurich rebels in the Bockenkrieg of 1804 was meant to forestall a French intervention by suppressing the unrest quickly. Despite his reserved and at times inflexible manner, he was held in high esteem in the Federal Diet, over which he presided in 1817, 1823 and 1829.

Von Wattenwyl owned Landshut Castle. He was a knight of the Royal Prussian Order of the Red Eagle. He died in Aarburg on 10 August 1832.

== Bibliography ==
- Sammlung bernischer Biographien, 3, 1898, 37–43
- Der Schweizerische Generalstab, 1, 95–101; 3, 194
- E. Gruner, Das bernische Patriziat und die Regeneration, 1943
- G. Andrey, Louis d'Affry, 1743–1810: premier landammann de la Suisse, 2003, 216–249
- H. Braun, Die Familie von Wattenwyl, 2004, especially 183–188

=== Archives ===
- Burgerbibliothek Bern: family archive (Familienarchiv)
- Bern State Archives (Staatsarchiv Bern), Bern: personal papers (Nachlass)
