= Samuel Mutach =

Swiss jurist and politician (1666–1735)

- Born: Bern
- Baptized: 24 December 1666
- Died: 14 July 1735; Bern
- Occupations: Jurist; politician
- Spouse: Anna Katharina Gross

Samuel Mutach (baptized 24 December 1666 – 14 July 1735) was a jurist and politician from Bern. He was considered one of the most important jurists of his time and wrote the legal handbook Substantzlicher Underricht von Gerichts- und Rechts-Sachen (1709). From 1719 he was a member of Bern's Small Council.

== Biography ==
Samuel Mutach was a member of the Mutach family. He was the son of Samuel, a member of the Grand Council, and Magdalena Wyss. He married Anna Katharina Gross, daughter of Gabriel, a member of the Grand Council, council secretary, and state secretary (Rats- und Staatsschreiber). His son Samuel (1690–1761) was a state secretary, and his nephew Gabriel (1702–1772) was, like him, a member of the Small Council.

From 1699 Mutach was a council expectant (Ratsexpektant), and in the Pietist trial of 1699 he was secretary of the religious commission (Religionskommission). From 1701 he was a member of the Grand Council, from 1706 bailiff (Landvogt) of Trachselwald, and from 1719 a member of the Small Council. He was considered one of the most important jurists of his time. He wrote Substantzlicher Underricht von Gerichts- und Rechts-Sachen (1709), a handbook on the legal system that gained great importance and is regarded as an important source for research on legal life in old Bern.

== Bibliography ==
- B. von Rodt, Genealogien burgerlicher Geschlechter der Stadt Bern, 4 (manuscript, 1950, Burgerbibliothek Bern)
