= Rudolf Sigmund von Wattenwyl =

Swiss politician (1731–1793)

- Born: 17 May 1731; Bern, Old Swiss Confederacy
- Died: 8 October 1793 (aged 62); Bern, Old Swiss Confederacy
- Occupation: Politician
- Spouse: Veronica Sophie Thormann (m. 1755)
- Children: Niklaus Rudolf von Wattenwyl
- Parents: Niklaus von Wattenwyl (father); Johanna Margaretha von Graffenried (mother)
- Relatives: Abraham Friedrich von Wattenwyl (brother); Abraham von Graffenried (uncle)

Rudolf Sigmund von Wattenwyl (17 May 1731 – 8 October 1793) was a Swiss politician from Bern. He was a member of the Grand Council from 1764 and of the Small Council from 1788, commander of Aarburg from 1767 to 1773, and banneret (Venner) in 1793. He was the father of Niklaus Rudolf von Wattenwyl.

== Biography ==
Rudolf Sigmund von Wattenwyl was born on 17 May 1731 in Bern, the son of Niklaus von Wattenwyl, lord of Jegenstorf and Diessbach, and Johanna Margaretha von Graffenried. His brother was Abraham Friedrich von Wattenwyl, and he was a nephew of Abraham von Graffenried. In 1755 he married Veronica Sophie Thormann, daughter of Alexander Thormann. His son was Niklaus Rudolf von Wattenwyl.

In 1755 von Wattenwyl was Schultheiss of the Äusserer Stand. From 1764 he was a member of the Grand Council of Bern. From 1767 to 1773 he was commander (Kommandant) of Aarburg, and from 1774 to 1777 a judge of the German court of appeal (Deutschappellationsrichter). From 1788 he was a member of the Small Council, and in 1793 he became banneret. He owned the vineyard estate (Rebgut) of Montbenay in Mont-sur-Rolle. He died in Bern on 8 October 1793.

== Bibliography ==
- Genealogie der Familie von Wattenwyl, edited by H. A. von Wattenwyl, 1943, plate IV A (revised 2005 by B. de Watteville)
- H. Braun, Die Geschichte der Familie von Wattenwyl, 2004
