= Flags and arms of Aargau =

Flag of a Swiss canton

Flag of Aargau

Coat of arms of Aargau

The flag and the coat of arms of Aargau (German: Fahne und Wappen des Kantons Aargau) was adopted in 1803 after the Act of Mediation by the newly-created Canton of Aargau, to a design by Samuel Ringier-Seelmatter. After some minor variations the design was further defined in 1930.

The flag, reflecting the arms, is divided into two parts: the left side is black with a central white wavy band; the right side is blue with three five-pointed stars.

The 1803 proposal did not explain the design, which differed in minor detail from the present one. Nevertheless it is often now taken that the left (or dexter) side symbolises the fertile soil of Aargau, through which flow the Aare, the Reuss and the Limmat, while the three stars on the right (or sinister) side symbolise the three major regions that make up the Canton: the County of Baden, Fricktal and the Freie Ämter.
