= Mutach family =

Family from Bern, Switzerland

The Mutach family (also von Mutach) was a family of councilors (Ratsgeschlecht) of Bern. It held citizenship of Zofingen from 1533, and in 1624 Daniel Mutach obtained citizenship of Bern. Several members of the family sat on Bern's Small Council or served as state secretaries, and in 1816 Abraham Friedrich von Mutach adopted the nobiliary particle von for the family. From 1783 until it died out in 1990, the family owned Holligen Castle in Bern.

== History ==
From 1533 the Mutach family held citizenship (Bürgerrecht) of Zofingen, where it provided members of the Grand and Small Councils. This line died out in 1770. Daniel (1599–1645) came to Bern as a notary, obtained citizenship there in 1624, and entered the Grand Council in 1635. His descendants, who were few in number, were officers, bailiffs (Vögte), and bailiwick secretaries (Amtssekretäre) in the 17th and 18th centuries.

Samuel and his nephew Gabriel (1702–1772) were members of the Small Council. Samuel's son Samuel (1690–1761) and the latter's sons Samuel (1720–1772) and Johann Rudolf (1729–1793) were state secretaries (Staatsschreiber), and Johann Rudolf and his nephew Abraham Friedrich were members of the Small Council. In 1816 Abraham Friedrich adopted the nobiliary particle von for his family.

Until the end of the 19th century, members of the family married almost exclusively into other council families of Bern. In the 19th and 20th centuries the family produced officers, physicians, and members of the technical professions. Karl Alfred (1831–1914) was a painter and photographer. From 1783 until it died out in 1990, the family owned Holligen Castle in Bern.

== Bibliography ==
- Schweizerisches Geschlechterbuch, 1, 1904, 349–352; 4, 1912, 389–393
- E. Bungener, Filiations protestantes, 2, part 2, 2002, 455

=== Archives ===
- Burgerbibliothek Bern
