= Unteraargau =

Lower watershed of the Aar River in Switzerland

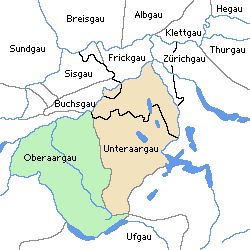
Alamannian Unteraargau in the 10th century

The Unteraargau is the lower watershed of the Aar River in the Swiss canton of Aargau.

== Geography ==
It corresponds approximately to the canton's southwestern districts of Aarau, Brugg, Kulm, Lenzburg and Zofingen. The Unteraargau includes that portion of the Aar valley between Aarau and the Klingnauer Stausee, as well as the Aar tributary valleys of the Aabach, Suhre, Wigger and Wyna rivers. It also includes some parts of the Jura Mountains.

== History ==
The region was held by the Swabian counts of Lenzburg and Kyburg, in 1264 it fell to the House of Habsburg. It is sometimes called the Berner Aargau, with reference to its incorporation into the territory of Bern from 1415 to 1798. Until 1415, the region belonged to the Further Austrian possessions of Archduke Frederick IV of Habsburg. When he was outlawed by Emperor Sigismund of Luxembourg, his territories were forfeit. His former subjects agreed to acquire the land, and the Bernese citizens of the Swiss Confederacy were the first on the ground.

The area was then consolidated with the Oberaargau into one region after the conquest by the city of Bern. When Bern lost its old power with the invasion by French troops after the French Revolution in 1798, the Unteraargau became the modern canton of Aargau. The boundary between the Oberaargau and Unteraargau was fixed in 1798 along the Wigger River. In 1802, however, it was shifted west to the river Murg. This action was confirmed by the Act of Mediation of Napoleon in 1803 and the Congress of Vienna in 1815.
