= Tegerfelden =

- Municipality
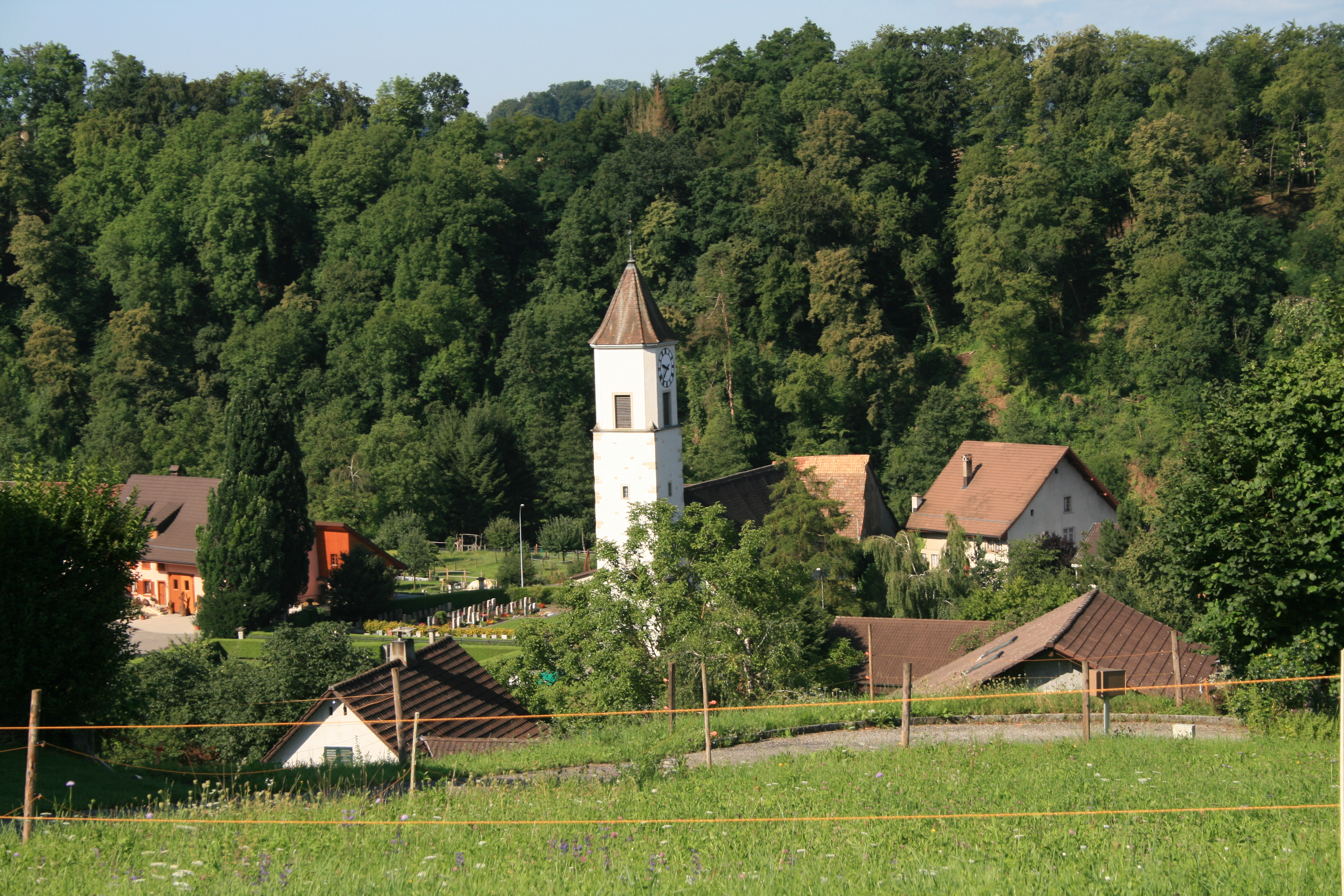

- Flag Coat of arms
- Location of Tegerfelden
- Location within Switzerland Location within Canton of Aargau
- Coordinates: 47°34′N 8°17′E
- Country: Switzerland
- Canton: Aargau
- District: Zurzach

Area
  - Total: 7.11 km^{2} (2.75 sq mi)
- Elevation: 364 m (1,194 ft)

Population (December 2005)
  - Total: 1,017
  - Density: 143/km^{2} (370/sq mi)
- Time zone: UTC+01:00 (CET)
  - Summer (DST): UTC+02:00 (CEST)
- Postal code: 5306
- SFOS number: 4320
- ISO 3166 code: CH-AG
- Surrounded by: Baldingen, Döttingen, Rekingen, Unterendingen, Würenlingen, Zurzach
- Website: www.tegerfelden.ch

Tegerfelden is a municipality in the district of Zurzach in the canton of Aargau in Switzerland.

== Geography ==
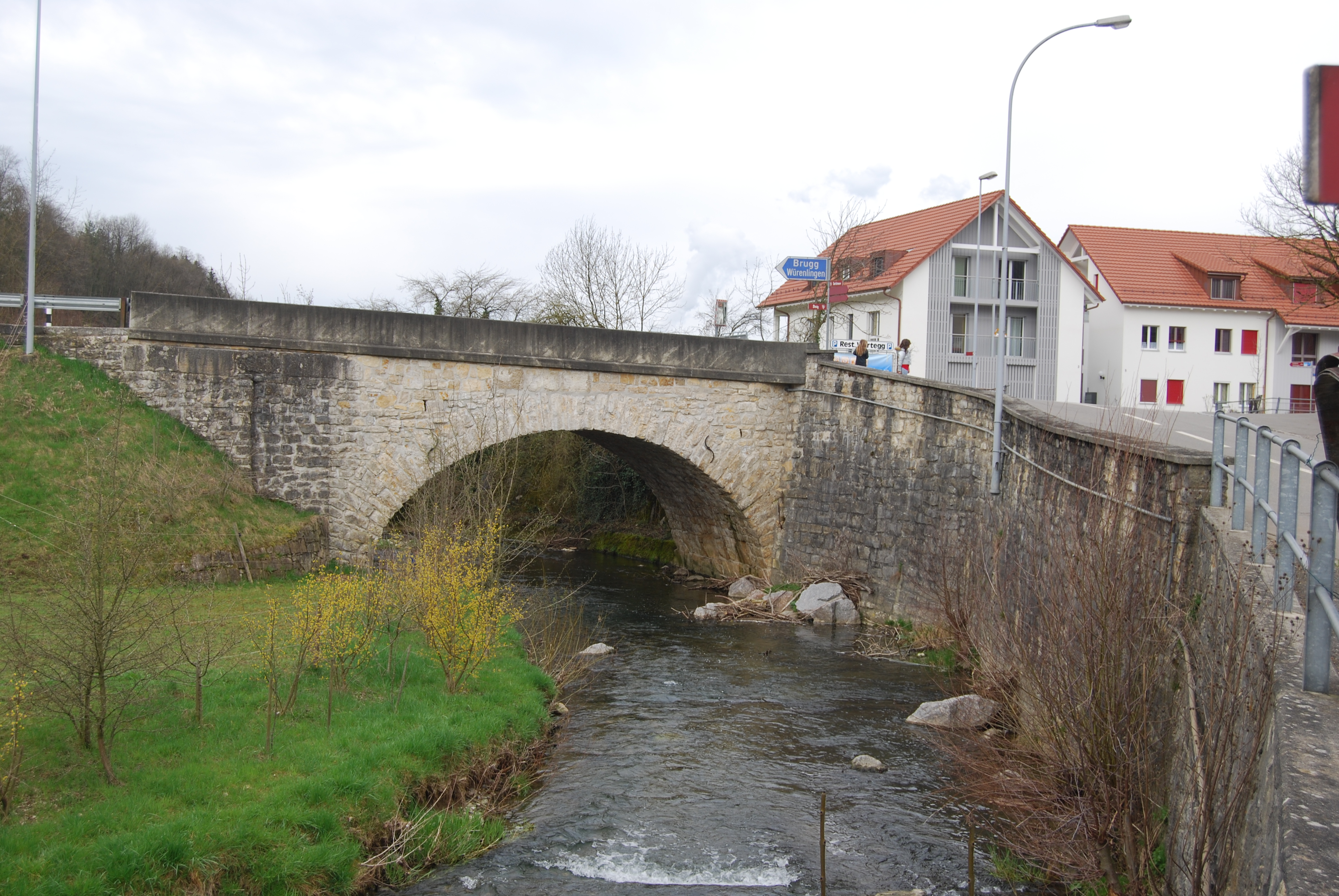
Surb river in Tegerfelden

Aerial view (1948)

Located in the Surb river valley, Tegerfelden has an area, as of 2009, of 7.11 square kilometers (2.75 sq mi). Of this area, 3.66 km^{2} (1.41 sq mi) or 51.5% is used for agricultural purposes, while 2.63 km^{2} (1.02 sq mi) or 37.0% is forested. Of the rest of the land, 0.71 km^{2} (0.27 sq mi) or 10.0% is settled (buildings or roads), 0.06 km^{2} (15 acres) or 0.8% is either rivers or lakes.

Of the built up area, housing and buildings made up 4.4% and transportation infrastructure made up 3.5%. Power and water infrastructure as well as other special developed areas made up 1.3% of the area Out of the forested land, all of the forested land area is covered with heavy forests. Of the agricultural land, 35.9% is used for growing crops and 9.1% is pastures, while 6.5% is used for orchards or vine crops. All the water in the municipality is flowing water.

== Coat of arms ==
The blazon of the municipal coat of arms is Azure Border compony Gules and Argent an Eagle displayed of the last.

== Demographics ==
Tegerfelden has a population (as of December 2020) of 1,202. As of 2008, 44.8% of the population are foreign nationals. Over the last 10 years (1997–2007) the population has changed at a rate of 5.9%. Most of the population (as of 2000) speaks German (96.3%), with Albanian being second most common ( 1.7%) and French being third ( 0.4%).

As of 2008, the gender distribution of the population was 50.0% male and 50.0% female. The population was made up of 458 Swiss men (44.8% of the population), and 53 (5.2%) non-Swiss men. There were 465 Swiss women (45.5%), and 46 (4.5%) non-Swiss women. In 2008 there were 12 live births to Swiss citizens and 1 birth to non-Swiss citizens, and in same time span there were 5 deaths of Swiss citizens. Ignoring immigration and emigration, the population of Swiss citizens increased by 7 while the foreign population increased by 1. There were 8 non-Swiss men who emigrated from Switzerland to another country and 4 non-Swiss women who emigrated from Switzerland to another country. The total Swiss population change in 2008 (from all sources) was an increase of 12 and the non-Swiss population change was an increase of 15 people. This represents a population growth rate of 2.7%.

The age distribution, as of 2008, in Tegerfelden is; 117 children or 11.4% of the population are between 0 and 9 years old and 128 teenagers or 12.5% are between 10 and 19. Of the adult population, 133 people or 13.0% of the population are between 20 and 29 years old. 134 people or 13.1% are between 30 and 39, 179 people or 17.4% are between 40 and 49, and 151 people or 14.7% are between 50 and 59. The senior population distribution is 95 people or 9.3% of the population are between 60 and 69 years old, 56 people or 5.5% are between 70 and 79, there are 28 people or 2.7% who are between 80 and 89, and there are 5 people or 0.5% who are 90 and older.

As of 2000, there were 37 homes with 1 or 2 persons in the household, 130 homes with 3 or 4 persons in the household, and 186 homes with 5 or more persons in the household. As of 2000, there were 366 private households (homes and apartments) in the municipality, and an average of 2.6 persons per household. In 2008 there were 158 single family homes (or 37.7% of the total) out of a total of 419 homes and apartments. There were a total of 3 empty apartments for a 0.7% vacancy rate. As of 2007, the construction rate of new housing units was 5 new units per 1000 residents.

In the 2007 federal election the most popular party was the SVP which received 47.57% of the vote. The next three most popular parties were the CVP (21.63%), the SP (10.65%) and the FDP (9.24%). In the federal election, a total of 363 votes were cast, and the voter turnout was 50.7%.

The historical population is given in the following table:

Historical population
Year	Pop.	±%
1975	654	—
1980	678	+3.7%
1990	827	+22.0%
2000	970	+17.3%

== Heritage sites of national significance ==
The so-called Gerichtshaus (a former Meierhof) is listed as a Swiss heritage site of national significance. The entire village of Tegerfelden is designated as part of the Inventory of Swiss Heritage Sites.

== Economy ==
As of 2007, Tegerfelden had an unemployment rate of 1.02%. As of 2005, there were 77 people employed in the primary economic sector and about 24 businesses involved in this sector. 142 people are employed in the secondary sector and there are 17 businesses in this sector. 85 people are employed in the tertiary sector, with 20 businesses in this sector.

In 2000 there were 515 workers who lived in the municipality. Of these, 388 or about 75.3% of the residents worked outside Tegerfelden while 117 people commuted into the municipality for work. There were a total of 244 jobs (of at least 6 hours per week) in the municipality. Of the working population, 8.5% used public transportation to get to work, and 60.7% used a private car.

== Religion ==
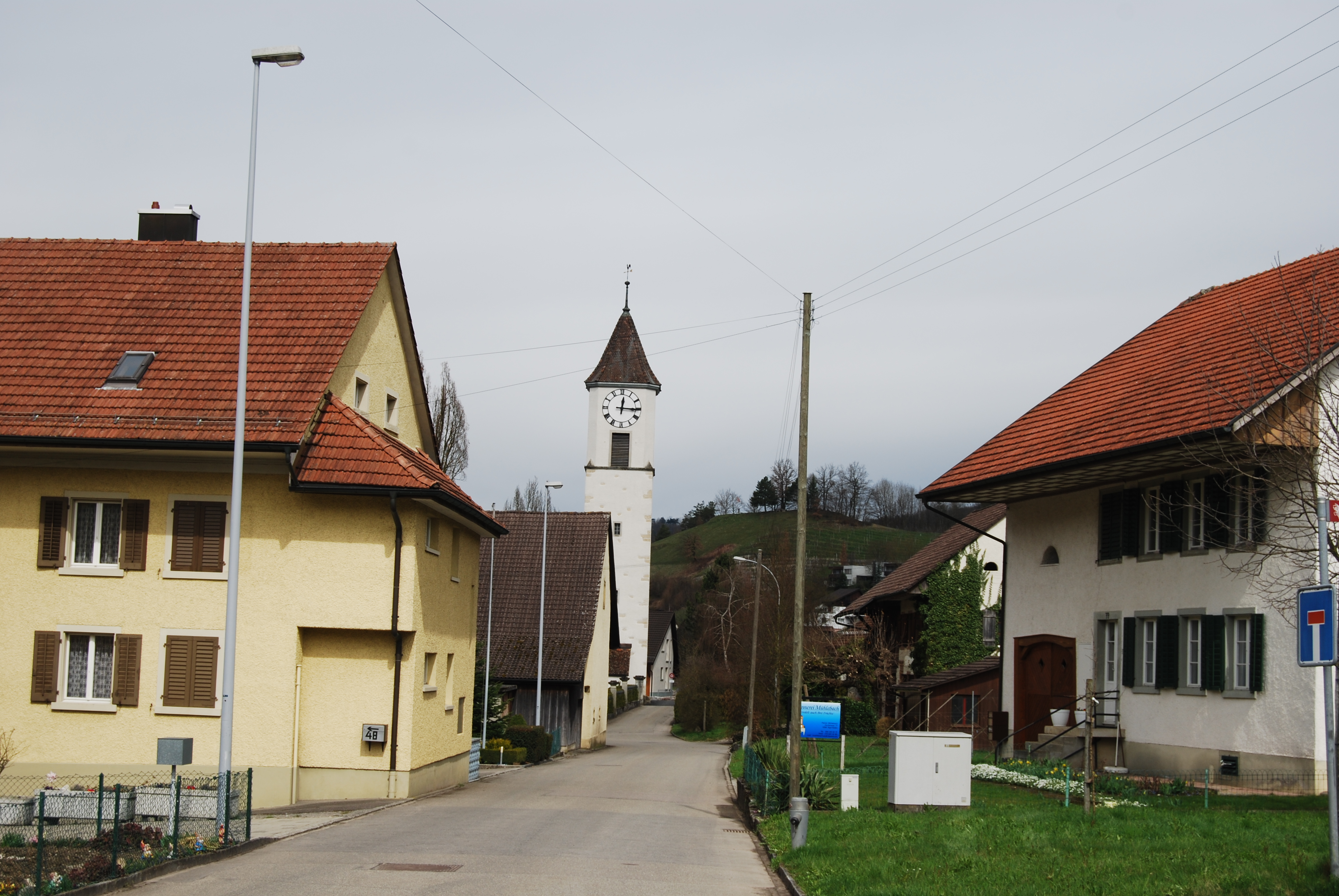
Church in Tegerfelden

From the 2000 census, 529 or 54.8% were Roman Catholic, while 335 or 34.7% belonged to the Swiss Reformed Church.

== Education ==
In Tegerfelden about 78.1% of the population (between age 25-64) have completed either non-mandatory upper secondary education or additional higher education (either university or a Fachhochschule). Of the school age population (in the 2008/2009 school year), there are 77 students attending primary school in the municipality.
