= Anna Maria Rüttimann-Meyer von Schauensee =

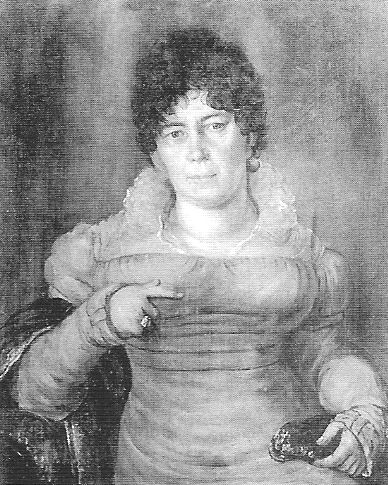
Anna Maria Rüttimann-Meyer von Schauensee

Anna Maria Rüttimann-Meyer von Schauensee (6 October 1772 in Luzern – 19 August 1856) was a politically influential Swiss salonnière during the Helvetian Republic. She was married to Vinzenz Rüttimann from 1794 and corresponded with Paul Usteri from 1799.

== Life ==
Anna Maria was the daughter of the politician Rudolf Franz Meyer Theoderik von Schauensee and Waldburga Fleckenstein and sister of Franz Bernhard Meyer von Schauensee, a justice minister of during the Helvetian Republic. Her salon was a centre of political debate. She acted as an advisor and mediator in conflicts between Melchior Mohr and Franz Bernhard Meyer-Schauensee. Her influence upon contemporary Swiss policy is believed to have been great.

== Sources ==
- Evelyn Boesch, «Das angenehmste ist, an unsere Republik zu denken». Anna Maria Rüttimann zum Verhältnis von Staat und Geschlecht in der Helvetik, in: *Ernst, Andreas u.a. (Hg.), Revolution und Innovation. Die konfliktreiche Entstehung des schweizerischen Bundesstaates von 1848, Zürich 1998, S. 161–172.
- Evelyn Boesch, «Ich weiss bald nicht mehr, wie ich in meinem Zimmer sitzen will». Was für die Patrizierin Anna Maria Rüttimann die helvetische Politik bedeutete, in: Mit Pfeffer und Pfiff, hg. v. Verein Frauenstadtrundgang Luzern 1998, S. 46–59.
- Evelyn Boesch, Mit Überzeugung und Hingabe. Republikanische Frauen und Männer erleben die Helvetik, in: Baur, Brigitte u.a. (Hg.), «Welch ein Leben». Quellentexte zum gesellschaftlichen Umbruch in der Innerschweiz nach 1798, Zürich 1998, S. 47–108.
- Esther Nünlist, Helvetische Revolution und «Weiber Instinkt». Der politische Einfluss der Republikanerin Anna Maria Rüttimann, Saarbrücken 2010, ISBN 978-3-639-29596-2.
