= Lorenz Wetter =

Swiss merchant & politician (1654–1734)

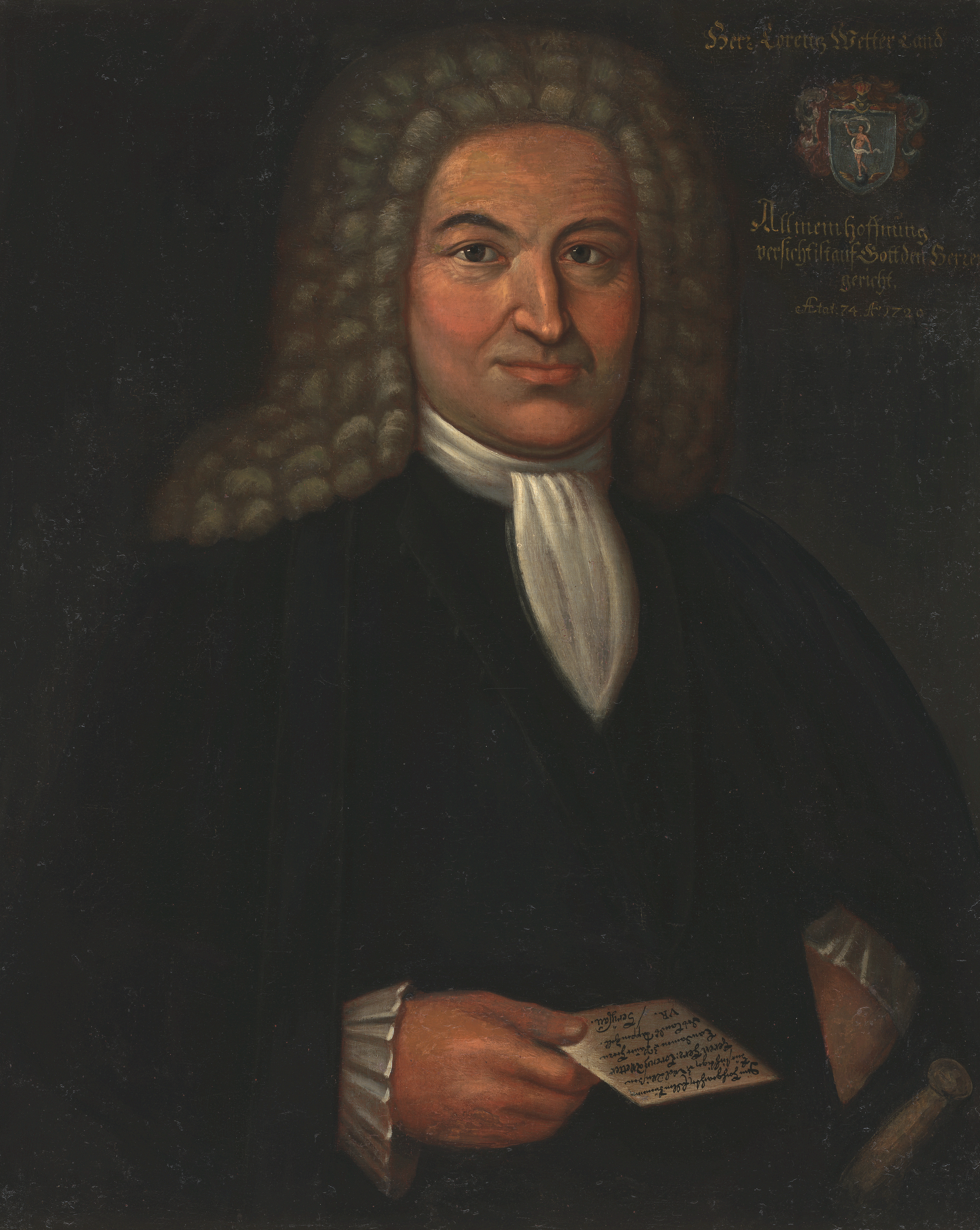
- Born: 9 February 1654; Gais, Appenzell Ausserrhoden
- Died: 24 February 1734 (aged 80); Herisau, Appenzell Ausserrhoden
- Occupations: Merchant, politician
- Spouse: Barbara Ziegler (m. 1690)

Lorenz Wetter (9 February 1654, Gais – 24 February 1734, Herisau) was a Swiss merchant and politician from Appenzell Ausserrhoden. Born into modest circumstances, he became one of the leading traders in the Ausserrhoden and served as Landammann from 1729 to 1733.

== Life and career ==
Wetter was the son of Ulrich Wetter, a peasant and mercenary, and Gertrud Kern. He was Protestant and a citizen of Gais, later also of Herisau from 1701. In 1690 he married Barbara Ziegler, daughter of Adrian Ziegler, a physician at Gais. He was the brother-in-law of Johannes Grob.

Supported by his patron and future father-in-law, Wetter acquired a solid commercial education in St. Gallen and then in Lyon (1670–1675), where he opened a business of his own. From 1675 to 1690, he worked as a merchant in the Thormann firm of Bern, accumulating a considerable fortune. In 1690 he moved to Herisau, where the bailiff's secretary Anton Schiess introduced him to linen cloth manufacturing. In partnership with Schiess and Jeremias Meyer — both brothers-in-law — he operated in the textile trade. In 1699 he had his firm registered in the merchant marks register of the Lyon traders, and from then on contributed regularly to the relief fund of Swiss merchants in Lyon.

In addition to linen exports, Wetter traded in gunpowder, saltpetre, spices, wool, horses, land, and mortgages, and also conducted banking and exchange operations. His enterprise rapidly became one of the most prosperous in the Ausserrhoden. He also owned a mill on the banks of the Glatt at Herisau.

Coming from a modest background, Wetter had to contend with the Zellweger and Tanner families, who dominated the economic and political life of the Ausserrhoden. He led the democratic opposition and influenced cantonal affairs for many years. During the Landhandel unrest (1732–1734), Wetter and his commercial partner Meyer headed the Partei der Harten, which contributed to his personal triumph. He served as treasurer of the Ausserrhoden (1718–1727), vice-Landammann (1727–1729), Landammann (1729–1733), and delegate to the Federal Diet.

== Bibliography ==
- Holderegger, Unternehmer, pp. 64, 96
