= Abraham Friedrich von Mutach =

Swiss politician and historian

- Born: 9 November 1765; Bern
- Died: 2 July 1831 (aged 65); Bern
- Education: University of Göttingen
- Occupations: Jurist; politician; historian
- Spouse: Johanna Charlotte Elisabeth von Tscharner

Abraham Friedrich von Mutach (9 November 1765 – 2 July 1831) was a politician and historian from Bern. He became the first chancellor of the Bernese Academy, newly founded in 1805, and in 1815, as president of the unification commission for the Jura, he directed the introduction of the Bernese administration there. His Revolutions-Geschichte der Republik Bern 1789–1815, written from 1817 to 1820, shows him to be the most important historian of the Bernese patriciate in the Restoration period.

== Biography ==
Abraham Friedrich von Mutach was a member of the Mutach family. He was the son of Abraham, a captain, member of the Grand Council, and Rathausammann (town hall official), and Elisabeth Jenner. He married Johanna Charlotte Elisabeth von Tscharner, daughter of Ludwig Vinzenz. His uncle Johann Rudolf (1729–1793) was a state secretary and a member of the Small Council. In 1816 Mutach adopted the nobiliary particle von for his family.

In 1778–1779 he attended the Gymnasium in Bern and then the Hohe Schule (higher school). From 1781 he studied law, in 1784–1785 in Göttingen, where he obtained a doctorate in law. He became a captain in 1784 and a member of the Grand Council of Bern in 1795. In 1797 he was a major and Bern's envoy to Paris, in 1798 a member of the provisional government, and in 1802 chief judge (Oberrichter) of the Bernese army. Under the Mediation he was a member of the Grand and Small Councils and of the finance council (Finanzrat).

In 1806 Mutach founded the first Bernese fire insurance institution (Brandversicherungsanstalt), the plan for which he had already drafted in a prize essay in 1789. More important, however, was the new foundation of the Bernese Academy in 1805, of which he became the first chancellor, holding the office with interruptions until 1830. The appointment of Samuel Ludwig Schnell to the chair of civil law is attributable to his liberal spirit. From 1819 to 1830 Mutach was president of the academic board of curators (Kuratel).

From 1814 he was again a member of the Small Council. In 1815, as president of the unification commission (Vereinigungskommission) for the Jura, he directed the constitutional amendment and the introduction of the Bernese administration there. In organizing the Bernese Reformation festival of 1828, he sought to draw attention to the historical greatness of Bern.

From 1817 to 1820 Mutach wrote his Revolutions-Geschichte der Republik Bern 1789–1815, which he had conceived as early as 1805 and which shows him to be the most important historian of the Bernese patriciate in the Restoration period. He saw in the fall and the revival of the Republic of Bern and of the Confederation a special case in the general history of states, guided by Providence, which had to be handed down to posterity. Following the Bernese tradition of official chronicle writing, he handed the manuscript to the Small Council on the condition that it be published only after his death.

== Bibliography ==
- E. Burkhard, Kanzler Abraham Friedrich von Mutach (1765–1831), 1923
- H. von Greyerz, Nation und Geschichte im bernischen Denken, 1953
- B. Junker, Geschichte des Kantons Bern seit 1798, 1, 1982
