= Johann Jakob Hess (politician) =

Swiss politician (1791–1857)

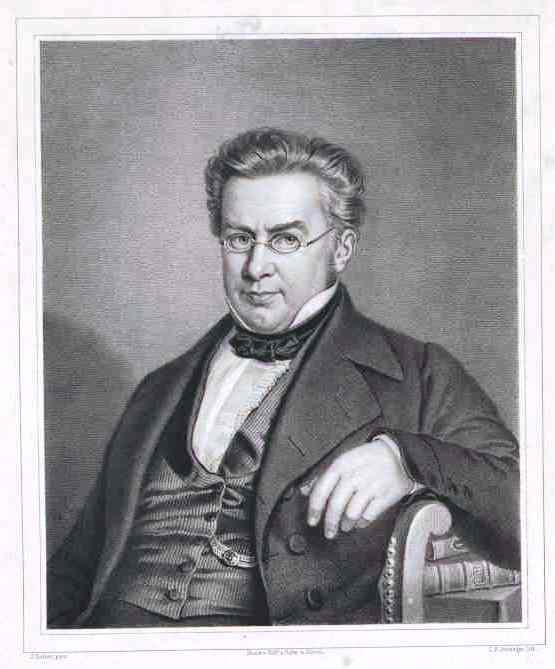
- Born: 16 February 1791; Zurich, Old Swiss Confederacy
- Died: 19 October 1857 (aged 66); Zurich, Switzerland
- Occupations: Jurist; politician
- Spouses: Regula Meyer (m. 1817) Anna Barbara Hirzel (m. 1853)
- Parents: Ludwig Hess (father); Anna Barbara Wegmann (mother)

Johann Jakob Hess (16 February 1791 – 19 October 1857) was a Swiss jurist and liberal politician from Zurich. In 1832 he was elected to the Executive Council and became second mayor (Bürgermeister) of the canton of Zurich; as police director he helped shape the Regeneration in the canton. As the mayor in office he presided over the Federal Diet in 1833 and 1839. He resigned in 1840, after the conservative Züriputsch.

== Biography ==
Johann Jakob Hess was born on 16 February 1791 in Zurich, the son of Ludwig Hess and Anna Barbara Wegmann. In 1817 he married Regula Meyer, daughter of Hans Jakob Meyer, a pastor, and in 1853 Anna Barbara Hirzel, daughter of Hans Konrad Hirzel, a member of the city council (Stadtrat).

From 1809 to 1811 Hess attended the Political Institute (Politisches Institut) of the city of Zurich, and from 1811 to 1813 he studied law at Heidelberg University. In 1818 he became secretary at the Zurich high court (Obergericht), and in 1828 a judge of the high court (Oberrichter).

Hess's political career began in 1823 with his election to the Grand Council of Zurich. At first of aristocratic views, toward the end of the Restoration he moved closer to the Reform party under the influence of Paul Usteri, acting as a mediator between the Radicals and the Liberals. In December 1830 he was delegated to the Zurich constitutional council (Verfassungsrat), which drafted the liberal Regeneration constitution of 1831.

In 1832 Hess was elected to the Executive Council (Regierungsrat) and as second mayor (Bürgermeister) of the canton of Zurich. As police director (Polizeidirektor) and a determined advocate of liberal progress, he helped shape the Regeneration in the canton of Zurich. He defended the Concordat of Seven (Siebnerkonkordat) of the liberal cantons and supported freedom of trade (Gewerbefreiheit), the redemption of tithes (Zehntenloskauf), the road-building program and the founding of the university, the teachers' seminary (Lehrerseminar) and the cantonal school (Kantonsschule). As the mayor in office (Amtsbürgermeister) he presided over the Federal Diet (Tagsatzung) in 1833 and 1839, the years in which Zurich was the presiding canton (Vorort). After the conservative Züriputsch of September 1839, Hess at first remained in the Executive Council as mayor, but he resigned in June 1840 after fierce attacks.

Hess then devoted himself mainly to charitable work. From 1839 to 1857 he was on the board (Vorsteherschaft) of the Bank in Zürich, and from 1830 to 1857 he presided over the family association of the Hess family of Zurich. His donations to private and public institutions reflect his strong public spirit. He died in Zurich on 19 October 1857.

== Bibliography ==
- J. A. Pupikofer, Johann Jakob Hess als Bürger und Staatsmann des Standes Zürich und eidgenössischer Bundespräsident, 1859
- E. Spiess, "Johann Jakob Hess", in Der Briefwechsel von Landammann G. J. Baumgartner, St. Gallen, mit Bürgermeister J. J. Hess, Zürich (1831–1839), vol. 1, 1972, 11–50

=== Archives ===
- Zentralbibliothek Zürich, manuscripts department, papers (Nachlass)
