= Aargau =

Canton of Switzerland

Canton of Aargau Kanton Aargau (German)
- Canton
- Flag Coat of arms Brandmark
- Interactive map of Canton of Aargau
- Coordinates: 47°5′N 8°0′E
- Country: Switzerland
- Capital and largest city: Aarau
- Subdivisions: 196 municipalities, 11 districts

Government
  - President: Dieter Egli (SP)
  - Executive: Executive Council (5)
  - Legislative: Grand Council (140)

Area
  - Total: 1,403.76 km^{2} (541.99 sq mi)

Population (December 2020)
  - Total: 694,072
  - Density: 494.438/km^{2} (1,280.59/sq mi)

GDP
  - Total: CHF 43.590 billion (2020)
  - Per capita: CHF 63,177 (2020)
- ISO 3166 code: CH-AG
- Highest point: 908 m (2,979 ft): Geissfluegrat
- Lowest point: 260 m (853 ft): Rhine at Kaiseraugst
- Joined: 1803
- Languages: German
- Website: ag.ch

Aargau (/ˈɑːrɡaʊ/ AR-gow, Swiss Standard German: [ˈaːrɡaʊ]), more formally the Canton of Aargau (German: Kanton Aargau; Romansh: Chantun Argovia; French: Canton d'Argovie; Italian: Canton Argovia), is one of the 26 cantons forming the Swiss Confederation. It is composed of eleven districts and its capital is Aarau.

Aargau is one of the most northerly cantons of Switzerland, and contains the lower course of the Aare River from which the name Aar-gau ("Aare province") is drawn. It is one of the most densely populated regions of Switzerland.

== History ==
=== Early history ===
The area of Aargau and the surrounding areas were controlled by the Helvetians, a tribe of Celts, as far back as 200 BC. It was eventually occupied by the Romans and then by the 6th century, the Franks. The Romans built a major settlement called Vindonissa, near the present location of Brugg.

=== Medieval Aargau ===
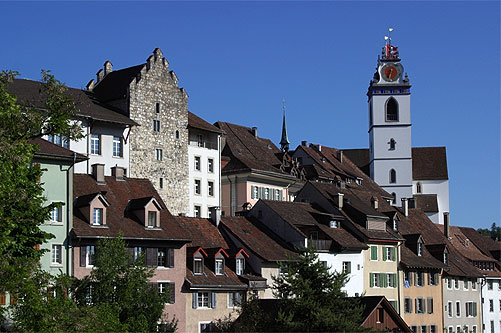
Aarau

The reconstructed Old High German name of Aargau is Argowe, first unambiguously attested (in the spelling Argue) in 795. The term described a territory only loosely equivalent to that of the modern canton, including the region between Aare and Reuss rivers, including Pilatus and Napf, i.e. including parts of the modern cantons of Bern (Bernese Aargau, Emmental, parts of the Bernese Oberland), Solothurn, Basel-Landschaft, Lucerne, Obwalden and Nidwalden, but not the parts of the modern canton east of the Reuss (Baden District), which were part of Zürichgau.

Within the Frankish Empire (8th to 10th centuries), the area was a disputed border region between the duchies of Alamannia and Burgundy. A line of the von Wetterau (Conradines) intermittently held the countship of Aargau from 750 until about 1030, when they lost it (having in the meantime taken the name von Tegerfelden). This division became the ill-defined (and sparsely settled) outer border of the early Holy Roman Empire at its formation in the second half of the 10th century. Most of the region came under the control of the ducal house of Zähringen and the comital houses of Habsburg and Kyburg by about 1200.

In the second half of the 13th century, the territory became divided between the territories claimed by the imperial cities of Bern, Lucerne and Solothurn and the Swiss canton of Unterwalden. The remaining portion, largely corresponding to the modern canton of Aargau, remained under the control of the Habsburgs until the "conquest of Aargau" by the Old Swiss Confederacy in 1415. Habsburg Castle itself, the original seat of the House of Habsburg, was taken by Bern in April 1415. The Habsburgs had founded a number of monasteries (with some structures enduring, e.g., in Wettingen and Muri), the closing of which by the government in 1841 was a contributing factor to the outbreak of the Swiss civil war – the "Sonderbund War" – in 1847.

=== Under the Swiss Confederation ===
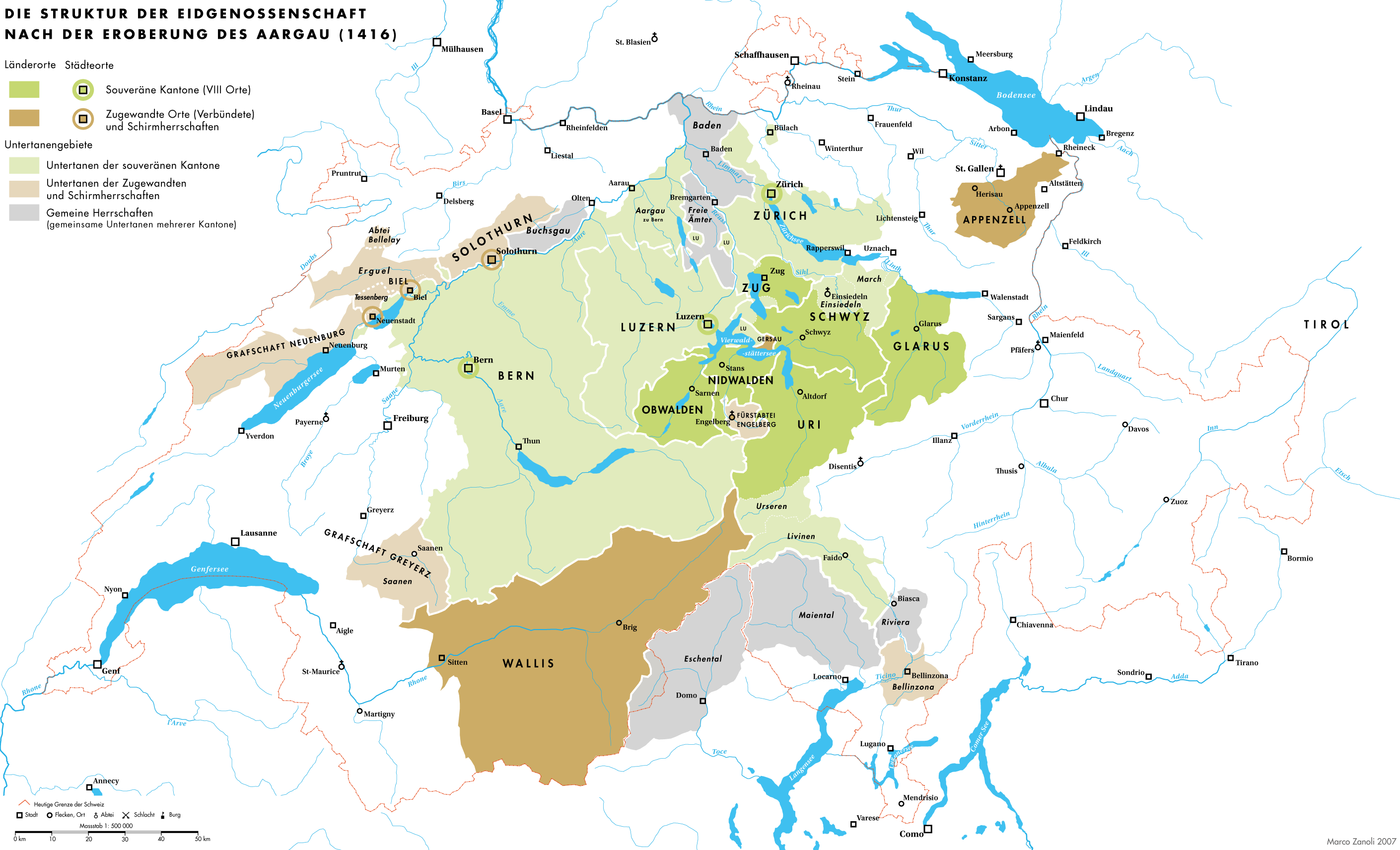
Switzerland in 1416, showing the part of the Aargau under Bernese control, the county of Baden and the Freie Ämter.

When Frederick IV of Habsburg sided with Antipope John XXIII at the Council of Constance, Emperor Sigismund placed him under the Imperial ban. (Note: The Imperial Ban outlawed all possessions of that person or family, in this case the Habsburgs. Thereafter, the Habsburg lands were open to the taking.) In July 1414, the Pope visited Bern and received assurances from the that they would move against the Habsburgs. A few months later the Swiss Confederation denounced the Treaty of 1412. Shortly thereafter in 1415, Bern and the rest of the Swiss Confederation used the ban as a pretext to invade the Aargau. The Confederation was able to quickly conquer the towns of Aarau, Lenzburg, Brugg and Zofingen along with most of the Habsburg castles. Bern kept the southwest portion (Zofingen, Aarburg, Aarau, Lenzburg, and Brugg), northward to the confluence of the Aare and Reuss. The important city of Baden was taken by a united Swiss army and governed by all 8 members of the Confederation. Some districts, named the Freie Ämter (free bailiwicks) – Mellingen, Muri, Villmergen, and Bremgarten, with the countship of Baden – were governed as "subject lands" by all or some of the Confederates. Shortly after the conquest of the Aargau by the Swiss, Frederick humbled himself to the Pope. The Pope reconciled with him and ordered all of the taken lands to be returned. The Swiss refused and years later after no serious attempts at re-acquisition, the Duke officially relinquished rights to the Swiss.

=== Unteraargau or Berner Aargau ===
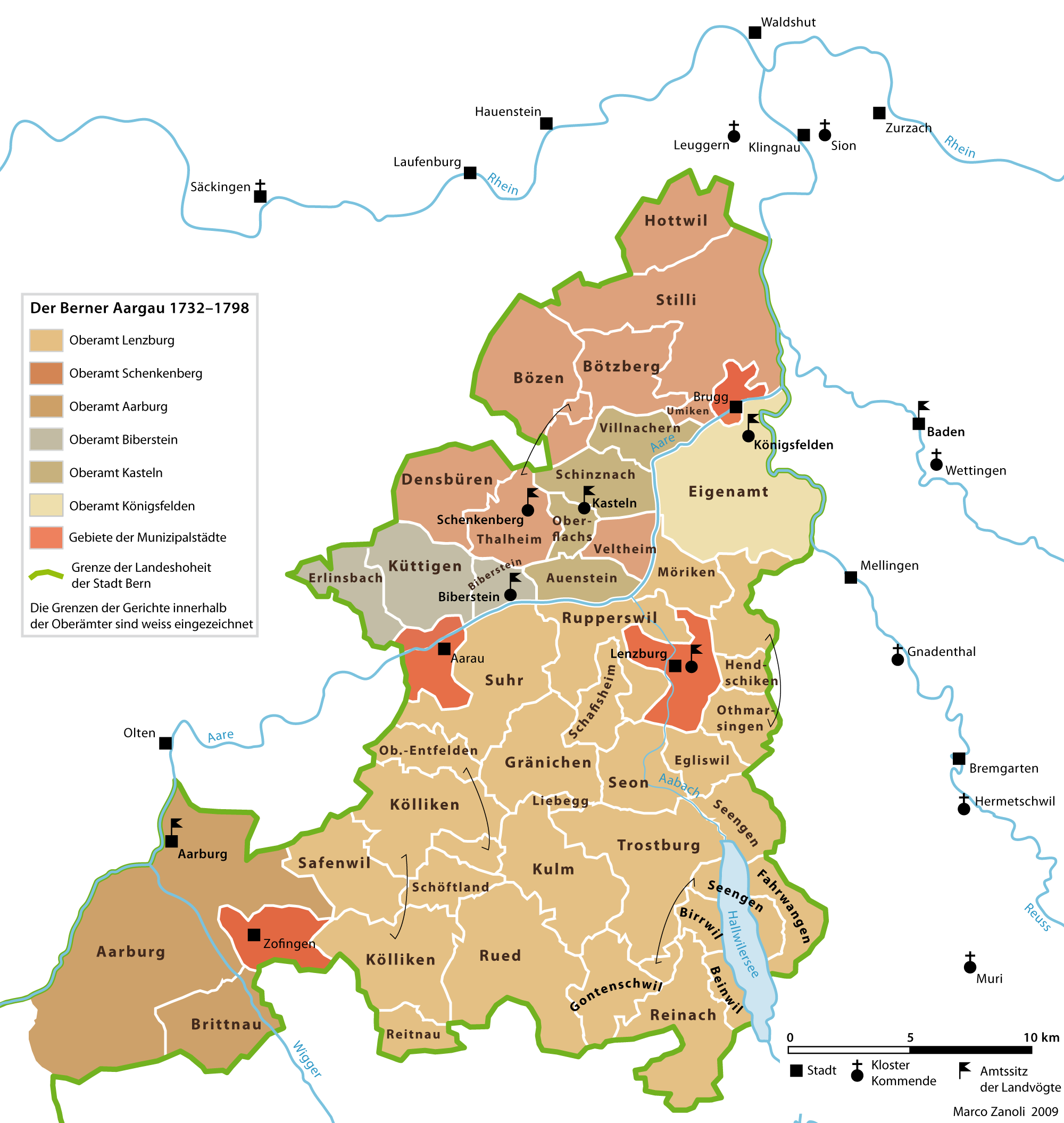
Districts in Bernese controlled Unteraargau

Bern's portion of the Aargau came to be known as the Unteraargau, also referred to as the Berner or Bernese Aargau. In 1514 Bern expanded north into the Jura and so came into possession of several strategically important mountain passes into the Austrian Fricktal. This land was added to the Unteraargau and was directly ruled from Bern. It was divided into seven rural bailiwicks and four administrative cities, Aarau, Zofingen, Lenzburg and Brugg. While the Habsburgs were driven out, many of their minor nobles were allowed to keep their lands and offices, though over time they lost power to the Bernese government. The bailiwick administration was based on a very small staff of officials, mostly made up of Bernese citizens, but with a few locals.

When Bern converted during the Protestant Reformation in 1528, the Unteraargau also converted. At the beginning of the 16th century a number of Anabaptists migrated into the upper Wynen and Rueder valleys from Zurich. Despite pressure from the Bernese authorities in the 16th and 17th centuries, Anabaptism never entirely disappeared from the Unteraargau.

Bern used the Aargau bailiwicks mostly as a source of grain for the rest of the city-state. The administrative cities remained economically only of regional importance. However, in the 17th and 18th centuries Bern encouraged industrial development in Unteraargau and by the late 18th century it was the most industrialized region in the city-state. The high industrialization led to high population growth in the 18th century, for example between 1764 and 1798, the population grew by 35%, far more than in other parts of the canton. In 1870 the proportion of farmers in Aarau, Lenzburg, Kulm, and Zofingen districts was 34–40%, while in the other districts it was 46–57%.

=== Freie Ämter ===
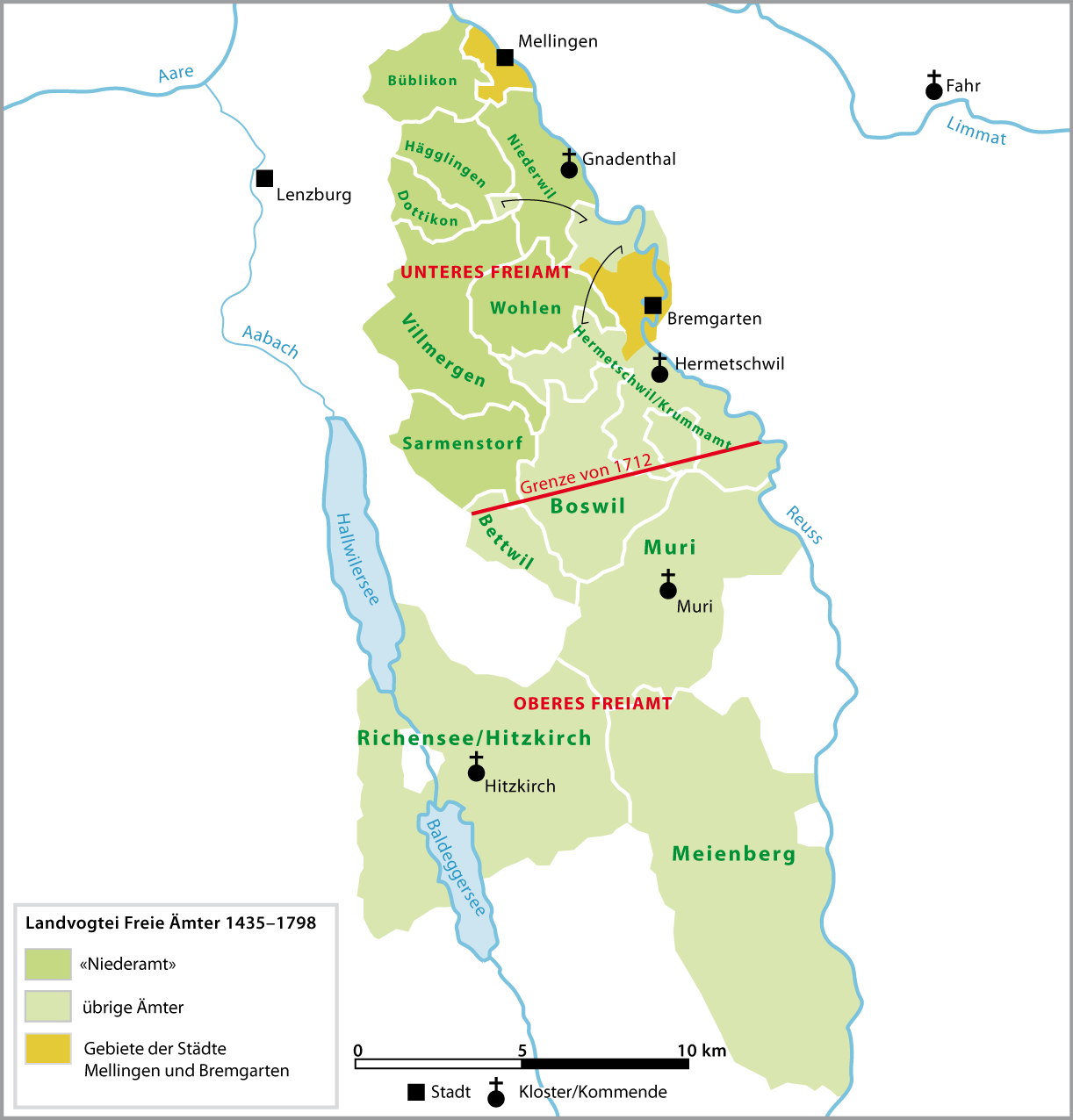
Map of the Freie Ämter, including the 1712 line dividing the Upper and Lower Freie Ämter

The rest of the Freie Ämter were collectively administered as subject territories by the rest of the Confederation. Muri Amt was assigned to Zürich, Lucerne, Schwyz, Unterwalden, Zug and Glarus, while the Ämter of Meienberg, Richensee and Villmergen were first given to Lucerne alone. The final boundary was set in 1425 by an arbitration tribunal and Lucerne had to give the three Ämter to be collectively ruled. The four Ämter were then consolidated under a single Confederation bailiff into what was known in the 15th century as the Waggental Bailiwick (German: Vogtei im Waggental). In the 16th century, it came to be known as the Vogtei der Freien Ämter. While the Freien Ämter often had independent lower courts, they were forced to accept the Confederation's sovereignty. Finally, in 1532, the canton of Uri became part of the collective administration of the Freien Ämter.

At the time of the Protestant Reformation, the majority of the Ämter converted to the new faith. In 1529, a wave of iconoclasm swept through the area and wiped away much of the old religion. After the defeat of Zürich in the second Battle of Kappel in 1531, the victorious five Catholic cantons marched their troops into the Freie Ämter and reconverted them to Catholicism.

In the First War of Villmergen, in 1656, and the Toggenburg War (or Second War of Villmergen), in 1712, the Freie Ämter became the staging ground for the warring Reformed and Catholic armies. While the peace after the 1656 war did not change the status quo, the fourth Peace of Aarau in 1712 brought about a reorganization of power relations. The victory gave Zürich the opportunity to force the Catholic cantons out of the government in the county of Baden and the adjacent area of the Freie Ämter. The Freie Ämter were then divided in two by a line drawn from the gallows in Fahrwangen to the Oberlunkhofen church steeple. The northern part, the so-called Unteren Freie Ämter (lower Freie Ämter), which included the districts of Boswil (in part) and Hermetschwil and the Niederamt, were ruled by Zürich, Bern and Glarus. The southern part, the Oberen Freie Ämter (upper Freie Ämter), were ruled by the previous seven cantons but Bern was added to make an eighth.

During the Helvetic Republic (1798–1803), the county of Baden, the Freie Ämter and the area known as the Kelleramt were combined into the canton of Baden.

=== County of Baden ===
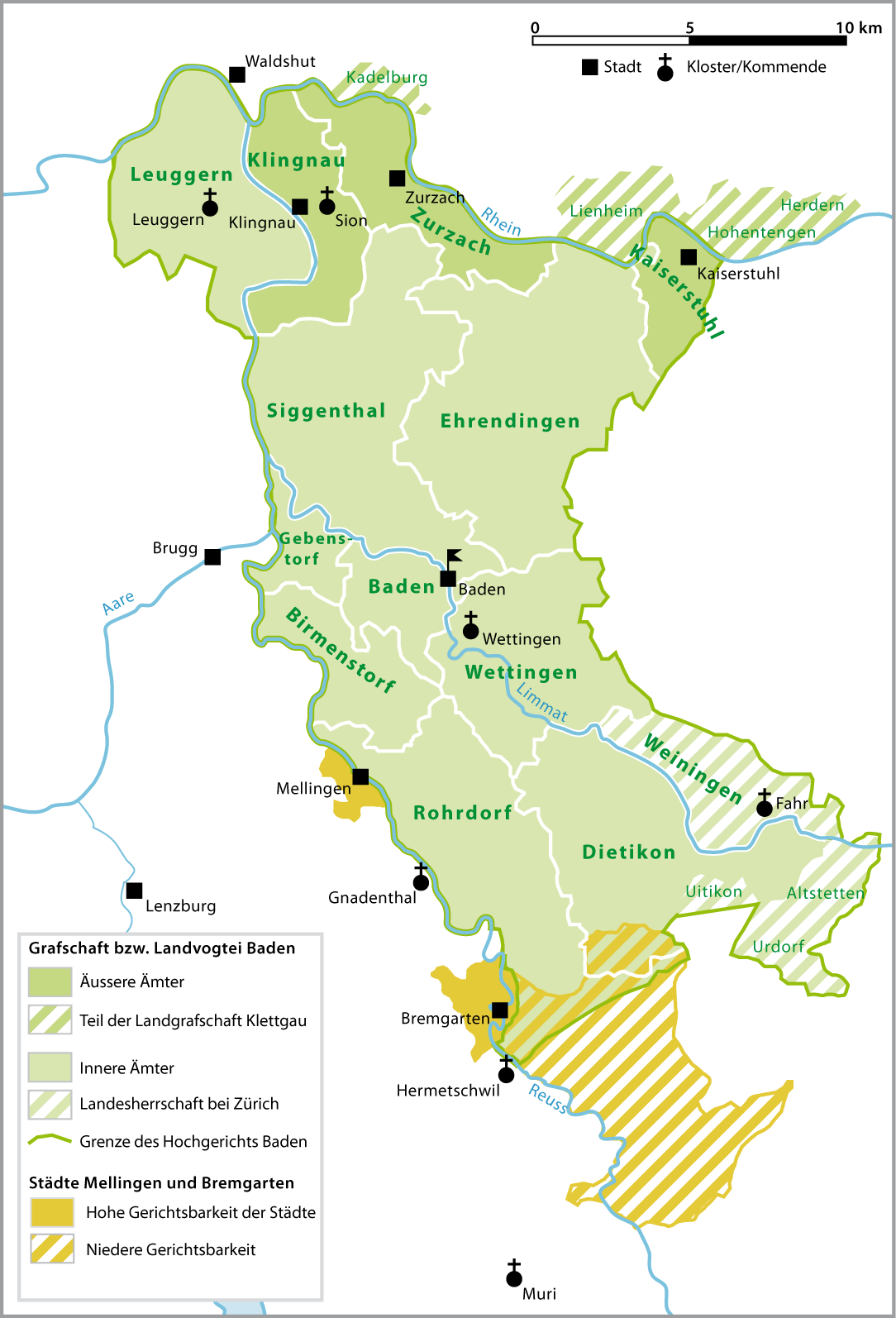
County of Baden

The County of Baden was a shared condominium of the entire Old Swiss Confederacy. After the Confederacy conquest in 1415, they retained much of the Habsburg legal structure, which caused a number of problems. The local nobility had the right to hold the low court in only about one fifth of the territory. There were over 30 different nobles who had the right to hold courts scattered around the surrounding lands. All these overlapping jurisdictions caused numerous conflicts, but gradually the Confederation was able to acquire these rights in the county. The cities of Baden, Bremgarten and Mellingen became the administrative centers and held the high courts. Together with the courts, the three administrative centers had considerable local autonomy, but were ruled by a governor who was appointed by the Acht Orte every two years. After the Protestant victory at the Second Battle of Villmergen, the administration of the County changed slightly. Instead of the Acht Orte appointing a bailiff together, Zürich and Bern each appointed the governor for 7 out of 16 years while Glarus appointed him for the remaining two years.

The chaotic legal structure and fragmented land ownership combined with a tradition of dividing the land among all the heirs in an inheritance prevented any large scale reforms. The governor tried in the 18th century to reform and standardize laws and ownership across the county, but with limited success. With an ever-changing administration, the County lacked a coherent long-term economic policy or support for reforms. By the end of the 18th century there were no factories or mills and only a few small cottage industries along the border with Zürich. Road construction first became a priority after 1750, when Zürich and Bern began appointing a governor for seven years.

During the Protestant Reformation, some of the municipalities converted to the new faith. However, starting in 1531, some of the old parishes were converted back to the old faith. The governors were appointed from both Catholic and Protestant cantons and since they changed every two years, neither faith gained a majority in the county.

After the French invasion, on 19 March 1798, the governments of Zürich and Bern agreed to the creation of the short lived canton of Baden in the Helvetic Republic. With the Act of Mediation in 1803, the canton of Baden was dissolved. Portions of the lands of the former County of Baden now became the District of Baden in the newly created canton of Aargau. After World War II, this formerly agrarian region saw striking growth and became the district with the largest and densest population in the canton (110,000 in 1990, 715 persons per km^{2}).

=== Forming the canton of Aargau ===
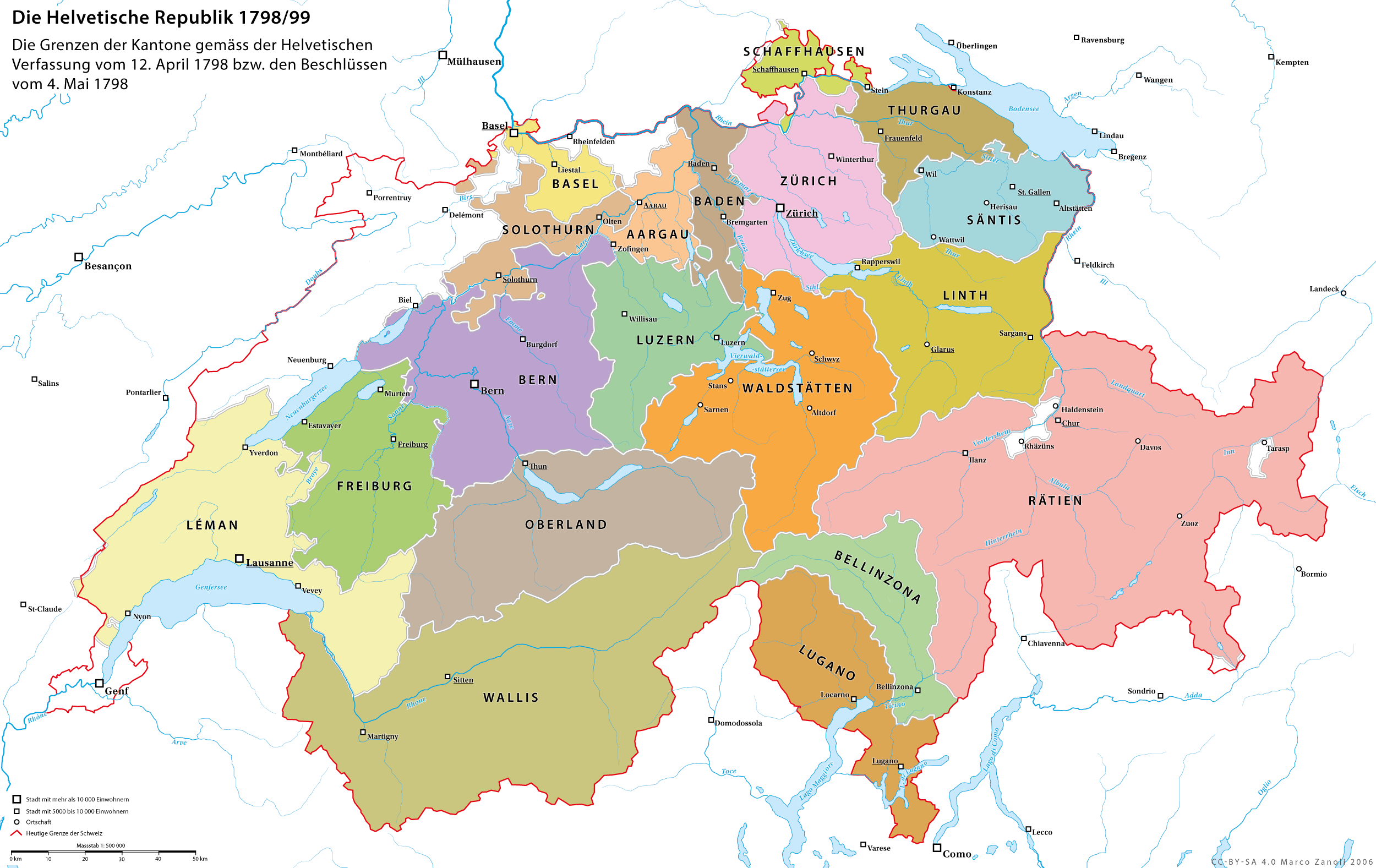
Helvetic Republic c. 1798/99, with the newly created cantons of Aargau and Baden

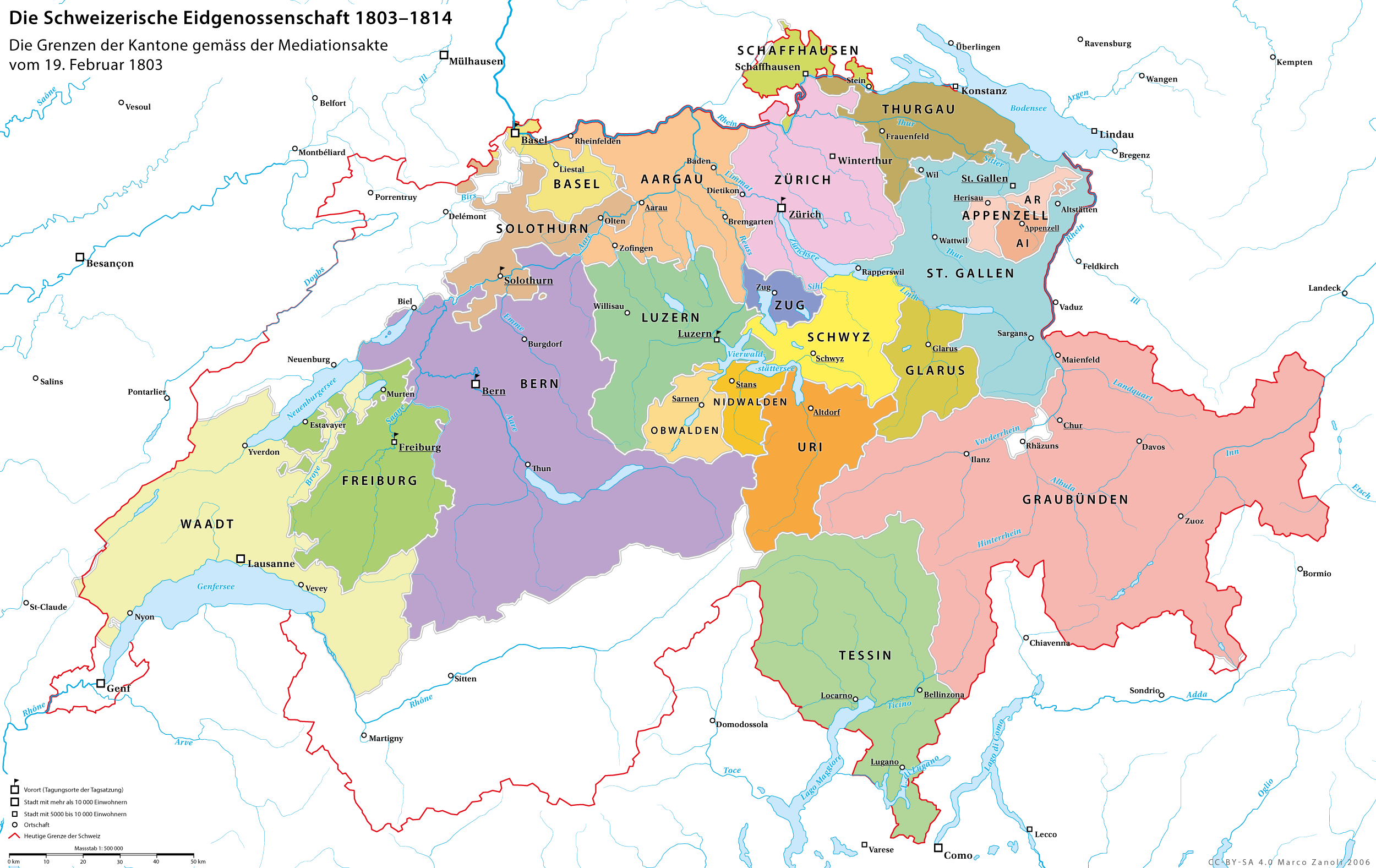
Swiss Confederation following the 1803 Act of Mediation, with the modern canton of Aargau formed

The contemporary canton of Aargau was formed in 1803, a canton of the Swiss Confederation as a result of the Act of Mediation. It was a combination of three short-lived cantons of the Helvetic Republic: Aargau (1798–1803), Baden (1798–1803) and Fricktal (1802–1803). Its creation is therefore rooted in the Napoleonic era. In the year 2003, the canton of Aargau celebrated its 200th anniversary.

French forces occupied the Aargau from 10 March to 18 April 1798; thereafter the Bernese portion became the canton of Aargau and the remainder formed the canton of Baden. Aborted plans to merge the two halves came in 1801 and 1802, and they were eventually united under the name Aargau, which was then admitted as a full member of the reconstituted Confederation following the Act of Mediation. Some parts of the canton of Baden at this point were transferred to other cantons: the Amt of Hitzkirch to Lucerne, whilst Hüttikon, Oetwil an der Limmat, Dietikon and Schlieren went to Zürich. In return, Lucerne's Amt of Merenschwand was transferred to Aargau (district of Muri).

The Fricktal, ceded in 1802 by Austria via Napoleonic France to the Helvetic Republic, was briefly a separate canton of the Helvetic Republic (the canton of Fricktal) under a Statthalter ('Lieutenant'), but on 19 March 1803 (following the Act of Mediation) was incorporated into the canton of Aargau.

The former cantons of Baden and Fricktal can still be identified with the contemporary districts – the canton of Baden is covered by the districts of Zurzach, Baden, Bremgarten, and Muri (albeit with the gains and losses of 1803 detailed above); the canton of Fricktal by the districts of Rheinfelden and Laufenburg (except for Hottwil which was transferred to that district in 2010).

=== Chief magistracy ===
The chief magistracy of Aargau changed its style repeatedly:

- first two consecutive Regierungsstatthalter :
  - April 1798 – November 1801 Jakob Emmanuel Feer (1754–1833)
  - 1802–1803 Johann Heinrich Rothpletz (1766–1833)
- Presidents of the Government Commission
  - 10 March 1803 – 26 April 1803 Johann Rudolf Dolder (1753–1807)
  - 26 April 1803 – 1815 a 'Small Council' (president rotating monthly)
- annual Amtsbürgermeister 1815–1831
- annual Landammänner since 1815

=== Jewish history in Aargau ===
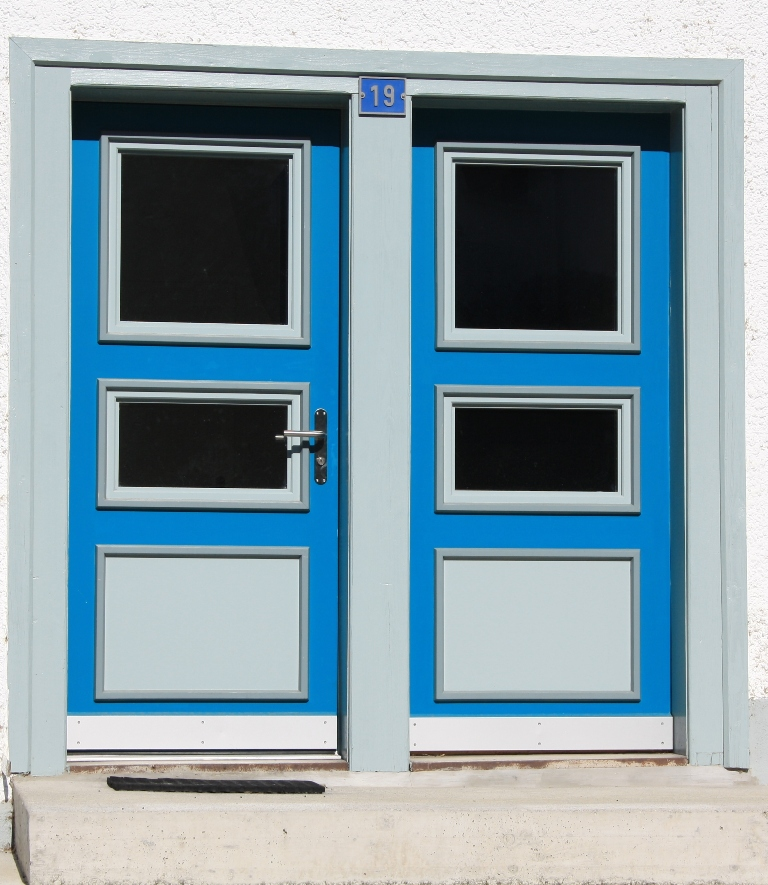
Two separate doors (one for Jews and one for Christians) on a house in Lengnau

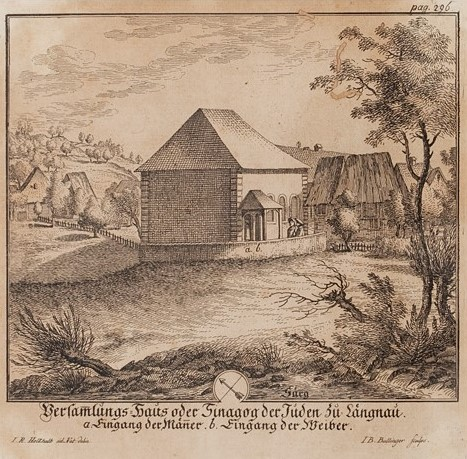
18th century etching of the synagogue in Lengnau. In the Jewish Museum of Switzerland's collection.

In the 17th century, Aargau was the only federal condominium where Jews were tolerated. In 1774, they were restricted to just two towns, Endingen and Lengnau. While the rural upper class pressed incessantly for the expulsion of the Jews, the financial interests of the authorities prevented it. They imposed special taxes on peddling and cattle trading, the primary Jewish professions. The Protestant occupiers also enjoyed the discomfort of the local Catholics by the presence of the Jewish community. The Jews were directly subordinate to the governor; from 1696, they were compelled to renew a letter of protection from him every 16 years.

During this period, Jews and Christians were not allowed to live under the same roof, neither were Jews allowed to own land or houses. They were taxed at a much higher rate than others and, in 1712, the Lengnau community was "pillaged." In 1760, they were further restricted regarding marriages and procreation. An exorbitant tax was levied on marriage licenses; oftentimes, they were outright refused. This remained the case until the 19th century. In 1799, the Helvetic republic abolished all special tolls, and, in 1802, removed the poll tax. On 5 May 1809, they were declared citizens and given broad rights regarding trade and farming. They were still restricted to Endingen and Lengnau until 7 May 1846, when their right to move and reside freely within the canton of Aargau was granted. On 24 September 1856, the Swiss Federal Council granted them full political rights within Aargau, as well as broad business rights; however the majority Christian population did not fully abide by these new liberal laws. The time of 1860 saw the canton government voting to grant suffrage in all local rights and to give their communities autonomy. Before the law was enacted, it was however repealed due to vocal opposition led by the Ultramonte Party.

In July 1863, the federal authorities granted all Jews full rights of citizens. However, they did not receive all of the rights in Endingen and Lengnau until a resolution of the Grand Council, on 15 May 1877, granted citizens' rights to the members of the Jewish communities of those places, giving them charters under the names of New Endingen and New Lengnau. The Swiss Jewish Kulturverein was instrumental in this fight from its founding in 1862 until it was dissolved 20 years later. During this period of diminished rights, they were not even allowed to bury their dead in Swiss soil and had to bury their dead on an island called Judenäule (Jews' Isle) on the Rhine near Waldshut. Beginning in 1603, the deceased Jews of the Surbtal communities were buried on the river island which was leased by the Jewish community. In 1750, as the island was repeatedly flooded and devastated, the Surbtal Jews asked the Tagsatzung to establish the Endingen cemetery in the vicinity of their communities.

== Geography ==
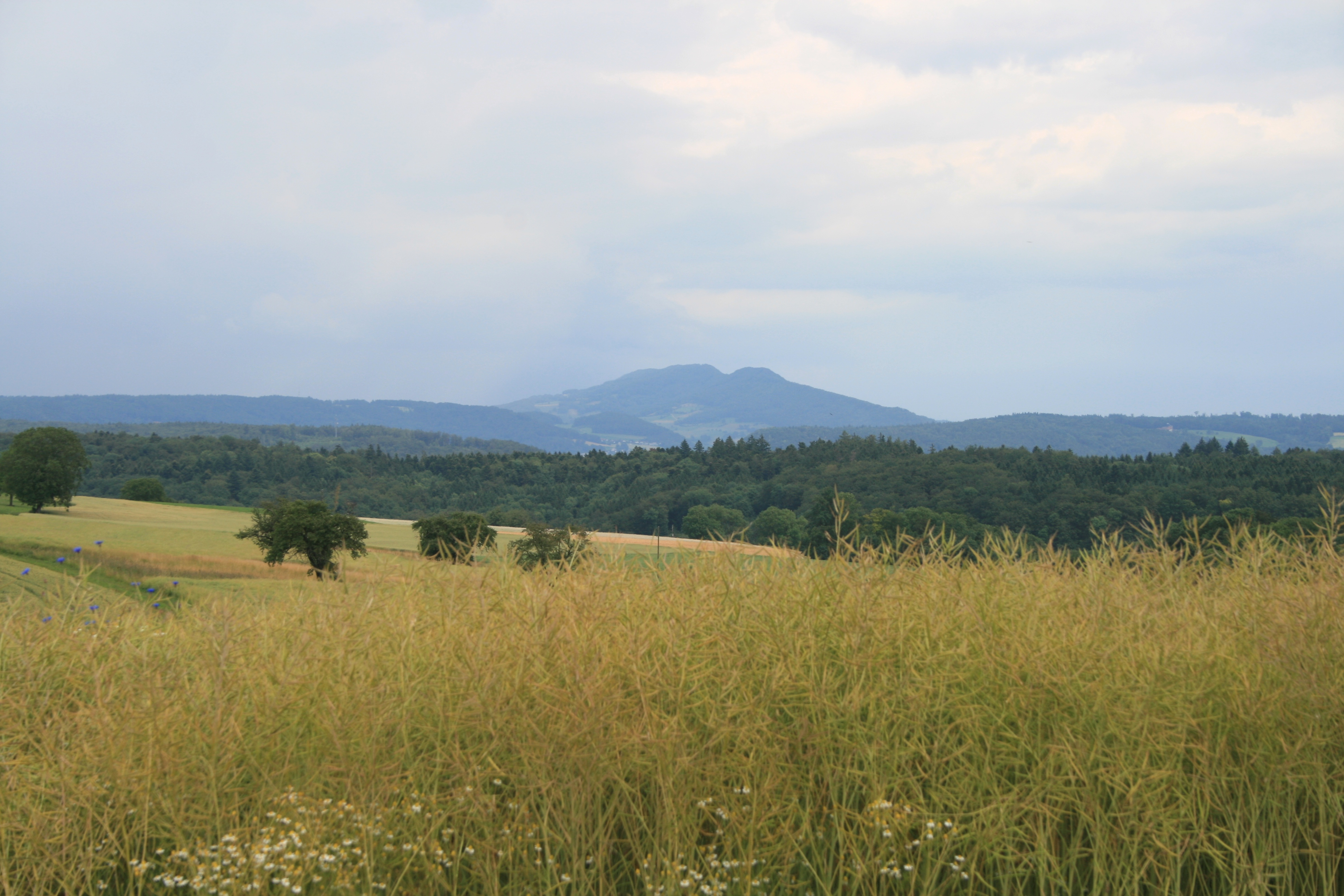
View of the Lägern from Bözberg

The capital of the canton is Aarau, which is located on its western border, on the Aare. The canton borders Germany (Baden-Württemberg) to the north, the Rhine forming the border. To the west lie the Swiss cantons of Basel-Landschaft, Solothurn and Bern; the canton of Lucerne lies south, and Zürich and Zug to the east. Its total area is 1,404 square kilometers (542 sq mi). Besides the Rhine, it contains two large rivers, the Aare and the Reuss.

The canton of Aargau is one of the least mountainous Swiss cantons, forming part of the Swiss Plateau, to the north of the Alps and the east of the Jura, above which rises low hills. Slightly over one-third of the canton is wooded (518 square kilometers (200 sq mi)), while nearly half is used from farming (635.7 square kilometers (245.4 sq mi)). 33.5 square kilometers (12.9 sq mi) or about 2.4% of the canton is considered unproductive, mostly lakes (notably Lake Hallwil) and streams. With a population density of 450/km^{2} (1,200/sq mi), the canton has a relatively high amount of land used for human development, with 216.7 square kilometers (83.7 sq mi) or about 15% of the canton developed for housing or transportation.

It contains the hot sulphur springs of Baden and Schinznach-Bad, while at Rheinfelden there are very extensive saline springs. Just below Brugg the Reuss and the Limmat join the Aar, while around Brugg are the ruined castle of Habsburg, the old convent of Königsfelden (with fine painted medieval glass) and the remains of the Roman settlement of Vindonissa (Windisch).

Fahr Monastery forms a small exclave of the canton, otherwise surrounded by the canton of Zürich, and since 2008 is part of the Aargau municipality of Würenlos.

== Political subdivisions ==
=== Districts ===
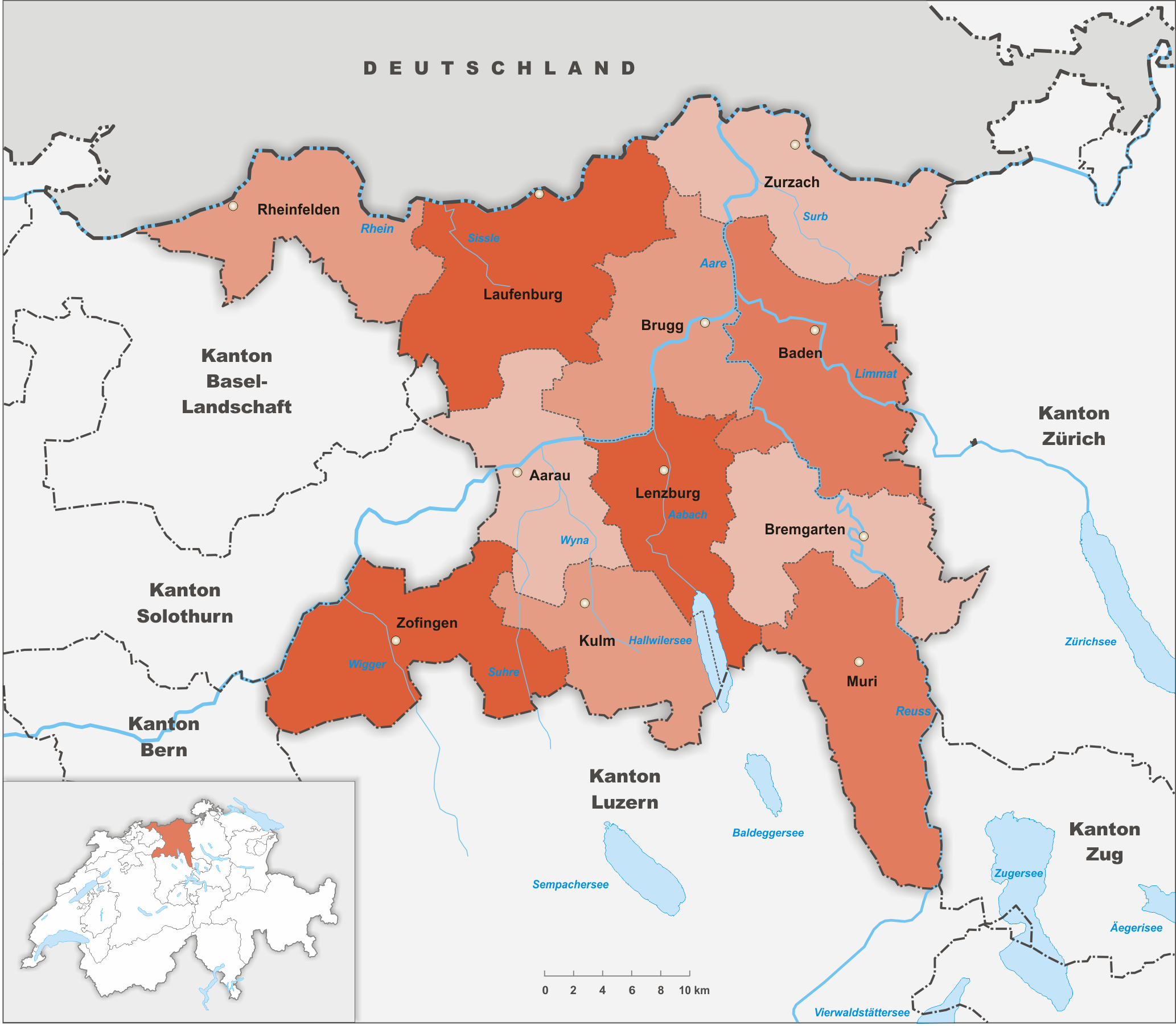
Districts in Aargau

Aargau is divided into 11 districts:

- Aarau with capital Aarau
- Baden with capital Baden
- Bremgarten with capital Bremgarten
- Brugg with capital Brugg
- Kulm with capital Unterkulm
- Laufenburg with capital Laufenburg
- Lenzburg with capital Lenzburg
- Muri with capital Muri
- Rheinfelden with capital Rheinfelden
- Zofingen with capital Zofingen
- Zurzach with capital Zurzach

The most recent change in district boundaries occurred in 2010 when Hottwil transferred from Brugg to Laufenburg, following its merger with other municipalities, all of which were in Laufenburg.

=== Municipalities ===
There are (as of 2026) 196 municipalities in the canton of Aargau. As with most Swiss cantons there has been a trend since the early 2000s for municipalities to merge, though mergers in Aargau have so far been less radical than in other cantons.

== Coat of arms ==
The blazon of the coat of arms is Per pale, dexter: sable, a fess wavy argent, charged with two cotises wavy azure; sinister: sky blue, three mullets of five argent.

The flag and arms of the canton of Aargau date to 1803 and are an original design by Samuel Ringier-Seelmatter; the current official design, specifying the stars as five-pointed, dates to 1930.

== Demographics ==
Aargau has a population (as of December 2020) of 694,072. As of 2010, 21.5% of the population are resident foreign nationals. Over the last 10 years (2000–2010) the population has changed at a rate of 11%. Migration accounted for 8.7%, while births and deaths accounted for 2.8%. Most of the population (as of 2000) speaks German (477,093 or 87.1%) as their first language, Italian is the second most common (17,847 or 3.3%) and Serbo-Croatian is the third (10,645 or 1.9%). There are 4,151 people who speak French and 618 people who speak Romansh.

Of the population in the canton, 146,421 or about 26.7% were born in Aargau and lived there in 2000. There were 140,768 or 25.7% who were born in the same canton, while 136,865 or 25.0% were born somewhere else in Switzerland, and 107,396 or 19.6% were born outside of Switzerland.

As of 2000, children and teenagers (0–19 years old) make up 24.3% of the population, while adults (20–64 years old) make up 62.3% and seniors (over 64 years old) make up 13.4%.

As of 2000, there were 227,656 people who were single and never married in the canton. There were 264,939 married individuals, 27,603 widows or widowers and 27,295 individuals who are divorced.

As of 2000, there were 224,128 private households in the canton, and an average of 2.4 persons per household. There were 69,062 households that consist of only one person and 16,254 households with five or more people. As of 2009, the construction rate of new housing units was 6.5 new units per 1000 residents. The vacancy rate for the canton, in 2010, was 1.54%.

The majority of the population is centered on one of three areas: the Aare Valley, the side branches of the Aare Valley, or along the Rhine.

== Historic population ==
The historical population is given in the following chart:

Historic Population Data
Year	Total Population	German Speaking	Italian Speaking	Protestant	Catholic	Christian Catholic	Jewish	Other	No religion given	Swiss	Non-Swiss
1850	199,852			107,194	91,096		1,562	79		196,890	2,962
1900	206,498	203,071	2,415	114,176	91,039		990	293		196,455	10,043
1950	300,782	291,101	5,335	171,296	122,172	5,096	496	1,722		290,049	10,733
1990	507,508	435,103	24,758	218,379	224,836	3,676	405	29,736	30,476	420,616	86,892
1993	512,000										
2000	547,493	477,093	17,847	203,949	219,800	3,418	342	20,816	57,573		

== Politics ==
In the 2011 federal election, the most popular party was the SVP which received 34.7% of the vote. The next three most popular parties were the SP/PS (18.0%), the FDP (11.5%) and the CVP (10.6%).

The SVP received about the same percentage of the vote as they did in the 2007 Federal election (36.2% in 2007 vs 34.7% in 2011). The SPS retained about the same popularity (17.9% in 2007), the FDP retained about the same popularity (13.6% in 2007) and the CVP retained about the same popularity (13.5% in 2007).

=== Federal election results ===
Percentage of the total vote per party in the canton in the National Council Elections 1971-2023
Party	Ideology	1971	1975	1979	1983	1987	1991	1995	1999	2003	2007	2011	2015	2019	2023
SVP/UDC	Swiss nationalism	12.5	12.8	13.9	14.1	15.7	17.9	19.8	31.8	34.6	36.2	34.7	38.0	31.5	35.5
SP/PS	Social democracy	23.9	24.2	27.6	27.5	18.5	17.4	19.4	18.7	21.2	17.9	18.0	16.1	16.5	16.4
FDP.The Liberals^{a}	Classical liberalism	15.9	17.7	20.5	20.2	20.3	16.4	15.8	17.2	15.3	13.6	11.5	15.1	13.6	13.1
The Centre	Christian democracy	*	*	*	*	*	*	*	*	*	*	*	*	*	12.0
GLP/PVL	Green liberalism	*	*	*	*	*	*	*	*	*	*	5.7	5.2	8.5	8.5
GPS/PES	Green politics	*	*	*	*	*	6.8	5.3	4.4	5.1	8.1	7.3	5.5	9.8	7.1
EVP/PEV	Christian democracy	3.8	4.6	5.0	5.0	3.4	3.3	3.0	3.8	5.2	4.2	3.2	3.3	3.6	4.5
EDU/UDF	Christian right	*	*	*	*	1.0	1.4	1.3	1.4	*	1.2	1.2	1.1	1.0	1.0
CVP/PDC/PPD/PCD	Christian democracy	20.0	20.6	22.5	21.5	18.9	14.5	14.2	16.3	15.6	13.5	10.6	8.6	9.9	* ^{d}
BDP/PBD	Conservatism	*	*	*	*	*	*	*	*	*	*	6.1	5.1	3.1	* ^{d}
SD/DS	National conservatism	3.4	3.5	1.6	4.0	4.5	4.5	4.5	2.7	1.4	0.7	0.4	*	*	*
FPS/PSL	Right-wing populism	*	*	*	*	5.3	13.2	11.3	1.4	0.2	*	*	*	*	*
FGA	Feminist	*	*	*	*	6.9	* ^{c}	0.1	*	0.8	*	*	*	*	*
Ring of Independents	Social liberalism	9.4	6.6	5.5	5.9	4.7	4.3	3.3	2.0	* ^{b}	*	*	*	*	*
Rep.	Right-wing populism	5.8	6.5	2.1	*	*	*	*	*	*	*	*	*	*	*
POCH	Progressivism	*	0.6	*	*	*	*	*	*	*	*	*	*	*	*
Other		5.2	2.9	1.1	1.8	0.9	0.4	1.1	0.1	0.4	4.7	1.3	2.0	2.5	1.9
Voter participation %		62.5	50.7	45.6	44.9	43.1	42.3	42.1	42.0	42.3	47.9	48.5	48.3		

^a FDP before 2009, FDP.The Liberals after 2009
^b "*" indicates that the party was not on the ballot in this canton.
^c Part of the GPS
^d CVP and BDP merged to form The Centre party.

=== Cantonal politics ===
The Grand Council of the canton of Aargau is called Grosser Rat. It is the legislature of the canton, has 140 seats, with members elected every four years.

== Religion ==
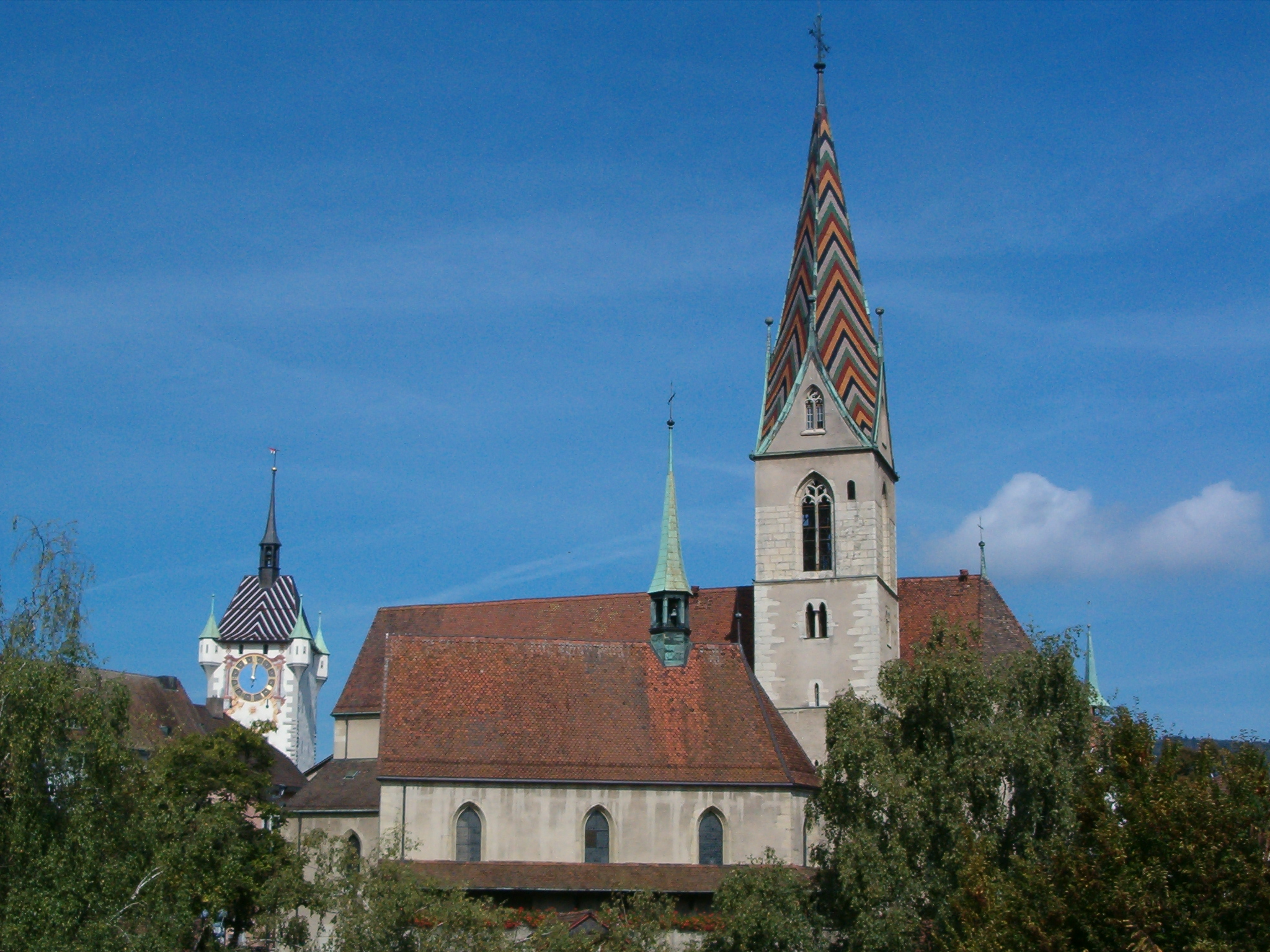
Catholic City Church in Baden, Aargau

From the 2000 census, 219,800 or 40.1% were Roman Catholic, while 189,606 or 34.6% belonged to the Swiss Reformed Church. Of the rest of the population, there were 11,523 members of an Orthodox church (or about 2.10% of the population), there were 3,418 individuals (or about 0.62% of the population) who belonged to the Christian Catholic Church, and there were 29,580 individuals (or about 5.40% of the population) who belonged to another Christian church. There were 342 individuals (or about 0.06% of the population) who were Jewish, and 30,072 (or about 5.49% of the population) who were Muslim. There were 1,463 individuals who were Buddhist, 2,089 individuals who were Hindu and 495 individuals who belonged to another church. 57,573 (or about 10.52% of the population) belonged to no church, are agnostic or atheist, and 15,875 individuals (or about 2.90% of the population) did not answer the question.

== Education ==
In Aargau about 212,069 or (38.7%) of the population have completed non-mandatory upper secondary education, and 70,896 or (12.9%) have completed additional higher education (either university or a Fachhochschule). Of the 70,896 who completed tertiary schooling, 63.6% were Swiss men, 20.9% were Swiss women, 10.4% were non-Swiss men and 5.2% were non-Swiss women.

== Economy ==
Leibstadt Nuclear Power Plant

As of 2010, Aargau had an unemployment rate of 3.6%. As of 2008, there were 11,436 people employed in the primary economic sector and about 3,927 businesses involved in this sector. 95,844 people were employed in the secondary sector and there were 6,055 businesses in this sector. 177,782 people were employed in the tertiary sector, with 21,530 businesses in this sector.

In 2008 the total number of full-time equivalent jobs was 238,225. The number of jobs in the primary sector was 7,167, of which 6,731 were in agriculture, 418 were in forestry or lumber production and 18 were in fishing or fisheries. The number of jobs in the secondary sector was 90,274 of which 64,089 or (71.0%) were in manufacturing, 366 or (0.4%) were in mining and 21,705 (24.0%) were in construction. The number of jobs in the tertiary sector was 140,784. In the tertiary sector; 38,793 or 27.6% were in the sale or repair of motor vehicles, 13,624 or 9.7% were in the movement and storage of goods, 8,150 or 5.8% were in a hotel or restaurant, 5,164 or 3.7% were in the information industry, 5,946 or 4.2% were the insurance or financial industry, 14,831 or 10.5% were technical professionals or scientists, 10,951 or 7.8% were in education and 21,952 or 15.6% were in health care.

Of the working population, 19.5% used public transportation to get to work, and 55.3% used a private car. Public transportation – bus and train – is provided by Busbetrieb Aarau AG.

The farmland of the canton of Aargau is some of the most fertile in Switzerland. Dairy farming, cereal and fruit farming are among the canton's main economic activities. The canton is also industrially developed, particularly in the fields of electrical engineering, precision instruments, iron, steel, cement and textiles.

Three of Switzerland's five nuclear power plants are in the canton of Aargau (Beznau I + II and Leibstadt). Additionally, the many rivers supply enough water for numerous hydroelectric power plants throughout the canton. The canton of Aargau is often called "the energy canton".

A significant number of people commute into the financial center of the city of Zürich, which is just across the cantonal border. As such the per capita cantonal income (in 2005) is 49,209 CHF.

Tourism is significant, particularly for the hot springs at Baden and Schinznach-Bad, the ancient castles, the landscape, and the many old museums in the canton. Hillwalking is another tourist attraction but is of only limited significance.

== See also ==
- Aargauer Zeitung
- FC Aarau
- Grand Prix of Aargau Canton, bicycle race
