= Vinzenz Rüttimann =

Swiss politician (1769–1844)

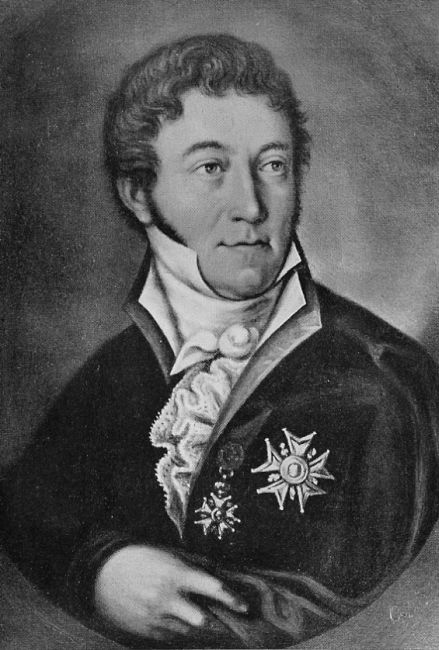
- Vinzenz Rüttimann, 1769−1844
- Born: Georg Vinzenz Rüttimann; 20 May 1769; Reiden, Lucerne, Old Swiss Confederacy
- Died: 15 January 1844 (aged 74); Lucerne, Switzerland
- Occupation: Politician
- Spouse: Anna Maria Rüttimann-Meyer von Schauensee

Vinzenz Rüttimann (20 May 1769 – 15 January 1844) was a leading Lucerne politician during the first half of the nineteenth century. He served as president of the Swiss Federal Assembly (Tagsatzung) during 1820 and again during 1826.

== Life ==
Georg Vinzenz Rüttimann was born in Reiden, in the northern part of the Canton of Lucerne. He was born into one of the leading Catholic families of Lucerne. His father, Johann Jost Rüttimann, was a member of the city's inner ruling council (Kleinrat), and through his mother, born Maria Elisabeth Dürler, he was related to other leading families. Vinzenz was sent away to Colmar for his education between 1780 and 1783, and there followed a further two years of private tuition back home in Lucerne after which for several years between 1785 and 1788 he traveled extensively in Germany, France and Italy.

In 1791 Vinzenz Rüttimann became a member of the city council, progressing in 1793 to membership of the inner ruling council, filling the vacancy caused by his father's death. He remained a member of the inner ruling council till 1798. During the 1790s he also served as a Habsburg bailiff and as secretary to the delegation sent on behalf of the thirteen cantons to meet with the agents of the French in Basel (1792/93). He also, in 1793 or 1794, joined the Helvetic (patriotic) Society. At the end of 1797 the Lucerne council sent him as delegate to the Swiss Federal Assembly (Tagsatzung) which that year met in Aarau. In 1798 he was a member of the Swiss federation's delegation in peace talks with the French.

Between 1798 and 1803 the more heavily populated central belt of Switzerland, included Lucerne, was occupied by French troops, although aspects of the existing federal power structure persisted apparently with the French emperor's acquiescence. From 1798 till 1802 Rüttimann occupied a senior governing role in the federal administration: politically during this time he was seen as an advocate for a greater coming together of the cantons. In this context he traveled to the important Helvetic Council meeting that took place between December 1802 and February 1803 as a delegate both for his home Canton of Lucerne and for the Italian speaking Canton of Ticino to the south. The French military presence in Switzerland was withdrawn in 1802, to be followed by a period of continuing political flux. Within Lucerne Vinzenz Rüttimann was president of the provisional governing commission, and during what came to be known as the Period of Mediation, till 1814, he served as Lucerne's "Schultheiß" (a mayoral level office). On a federal level, during 1808 he was also designated as "Chief officer/magistrate" (Landammann) of the Swiss Confederation.

Reflecting widespread dissatisfaction with general unruliness under the Lucerne Cantonal government since the setting aside of the traditional old regime, on 16 November 1814 Vinzenz Rüttimann led a group of leading citizens in a coup d'etat to protect the traditional status quo through a reversion to a modified version of the "patriarchal" pre-revolutionary constitutional structure. In addition to the old patriarchal families, the new structure now also included members of the increasingly important middle class elements. A few years later, in 1818, Rüttimann participated in negotiations in Rome over diocesan issues, which led to the transfer of Lucerne to the Swiss Diocese of Basel following the dissolution of the imperial Diocese of Constance.

In terms of federal politics, between 1807 and 1829 Rüttimann was regularly a delegate from Lucerne to the Swiss Swiss Federal Assembly (Tagsatzung) of which he was elected president in 1820 and 1826, which made him the senior political officer in the Swiss confederation, although the decentralised power structure in the country, meant that in the nineteenth century, as to a lesser extent still in the twenty-first, most important political decision were taken at the cantonal level.
