= Landammann =

Title for multiple government positions in Switzerland

Landammann (plural Landammänner), is the German title used by the chief magistrate in certain cantons of Switzerland and at times featured in the head of state's style at the confederal level.

Landammann is also the official title of the mayor of Davos.

== Old Swiss Confederacy ==
Landammann or Ammann was the elected judge and leader of the Landsgemeinde.

The term existed in the high medieval period and was continued in the Old Swiss Confederacy of the 14th to 18th centuries.

== Napoleonic period ==
While before and after other titles, generally expressing precedence, were used, the title of the Head of State of the Swiss Confederation has been:

- Erster Landammann (in German)/ (in French) Premier Landamman 'First official of the country': 23 November 1801 – 6 February 1802, Aloys Reding von Biberegg (b. 1765 – d. 1818); he succeeded himself as the first under the new, shorter, non-distinctive title:
- Landammänner/ Landammans:
  - 6 February 1802 – 20 April 1802, Aloys Reding von Biberegg
  - 20 April 1802 – 5 July 1802, Vinzenz Rüttimann (acting) (b. 1769 – d. 1844)
  - 5 July 1802 – 8 March 1803, Johann Rudolf Dolder (b. 1753 – d. 1807)
  - August 1802 – September 1802, Aloys Reding von Biberegg (again; now in rebellion)
- Under French occupation, when emperor Napoleon I Bonaparte styled himself 'Mediator' (equivalent to his title Protector in the German Confederatio of the Rhine) of the Swiss (at first Helvetic) Confederation, the actual Head of the Confederation was simply the chief magistrate of the canton hosting the Swiss Diet (Helvetic confederal parliament), with the title Landammann der Schweiz (in German)/ Landamman de la Suisse (in French)/ Landamano della Svizzera (in Italian), usually for a year, 10 March 1803 – 31 December 1813
- Louis d’Affry (Freiburg), 10 March – 31 December 1803 (1st time)
- Niklaus Rudolf von Wattenwyl (Bern), 1804 (1st time)
- Peter Glutz-Ruchti (Solothurn), 1805
- Andreas Merian (Basel), 1806
- Hans von Reinhard (Zürich), 1807 (1st time)
- Vinzenz Rüttimann (Luzern), 1808
- Louis d’Affry (Freiburg), 1809 (2nd time)
- Niklaus Rudolf von Wattenwyl (Bern), 1810 (2nd time)
- Heinrich Daniel Balthasar Grimm von Wartenfels (Solothurn), 1811
- Peter Burckhardt (Basel), 1812
- Hans von Reinhard (Zürich), 1813 (2nd time)

== Contemporary Switzerland ==
If the office is held by a woman, she is addressed as Frau Landammann (Ms. Landammann). The French version is Landamman (plural Landammans), the Italian Landamano (plural Landamani).

Today, Landammann still is the title of the president of the cantonal executive in the following Swiss cantons:

- Aargau annual since 1831-32 (before: an Amtsbürgermeister)
- Appenzell Innerrhoden
- Appenzell Ausserrhoden
- Glarus
- Nidwalden
- Obwalden
- Schwyz
- Solothurn
- Uri
- Zug

Some Swiss towns in those cantons use the equivalent title Stadtammann for the mayor.

== See also ==
- Amtmann
- Reichsvogt
- Vogt (Switzerland)
