= Bailiwick of Hitzkirch =

Former bailiwick in Switzerland

Bailiwick of Hitzkirch Amt Hitzkirch
- Bailiwick of the Freie Ämter
- 1425–1798
- Capital: Hitzkirch
- History
  - Established: 1425
  - Disestablished: 1798

The Bailiwick of Hitzkirch (German: Amt Hitzkirch), earlier called the office of Richensee, was an office (Amt) of the Freie Ämter, a common bailiwick of the Swiss Confederates, from 1425 until 1798. It consisted of the northern part of the Austrian office of Richensee, the part that belonged to the parish of Hitzkirch. In 1803 it was assigned to the canton of Lucerne in exchange for Merenschwand and incorporated into the district (Amt) of Hochdorf.

== History ==
Lucerne occupied the southern part of the Austrian office of Richensee around 1386 and after 1395, and the northern part in 1415. In 1420 the Gesslers renounced their rights as holders of the pledge in the northern part of the office. In 1425 the northern part, which belonged to the parish of Hitzkirch, was assigned as a former Austrian office to the common cantons (Gemeine Orte) and thus to the Freie Ämter. In the course of the 15th and 16th centuries its name changed from Richensee, the administrative seat in the Kyburg and Habsburg period, to Hitzkirch, the seat of the deputy bailiff (Untervogt). Until the 16th century Hitzkirch had its own high court (near Richensee), a weekly court (Wochengericht) and its own customary law (Amtsrecht).

Under the influence of the Bernese commander (Komtur) of Hitzkirch, the parish of Hitzkirch adopted the Reformation in 1529, but after 1531 it was returned to Catholicism, mainly by Lucerne; the banner privilege was withdrawn from 1533 to 1611. In 1653 the office took part in the peasant uprising. In 1798 it came to the canton of Baden (district of Sarmenstorf). In 1803 it was assigned to the canton of Lucerne in exchange for Merenschwand and incorporated into the district of Hochdorf. After the Helvetic Republic, several attempts to merge the small municipalities of the region failed, among them in 1807 and 1887.

== Bibliography ==
- E. Achermann, Mein Tal, 1976
- F. Glauser, J. J. Siegrist, Die Luzerner Pfarreien und Landvogteien, 1977
- H. Büchler-Mattmann, B. Häfliger, Familien im Hitzkirchertal 1678, 1991

=== Sources ===
- Collection of Swiss Law Sources, AG II/8

=== Archives ===
- Staatsarchiv Luzern
