= Canton of Baden =

Canton of the Helvetic Republic

Coordinates: 47°28′N 8°18′E

Canton of Baden Kanton Baden
- Canton of the Helvetic Republic
- 1798–1803
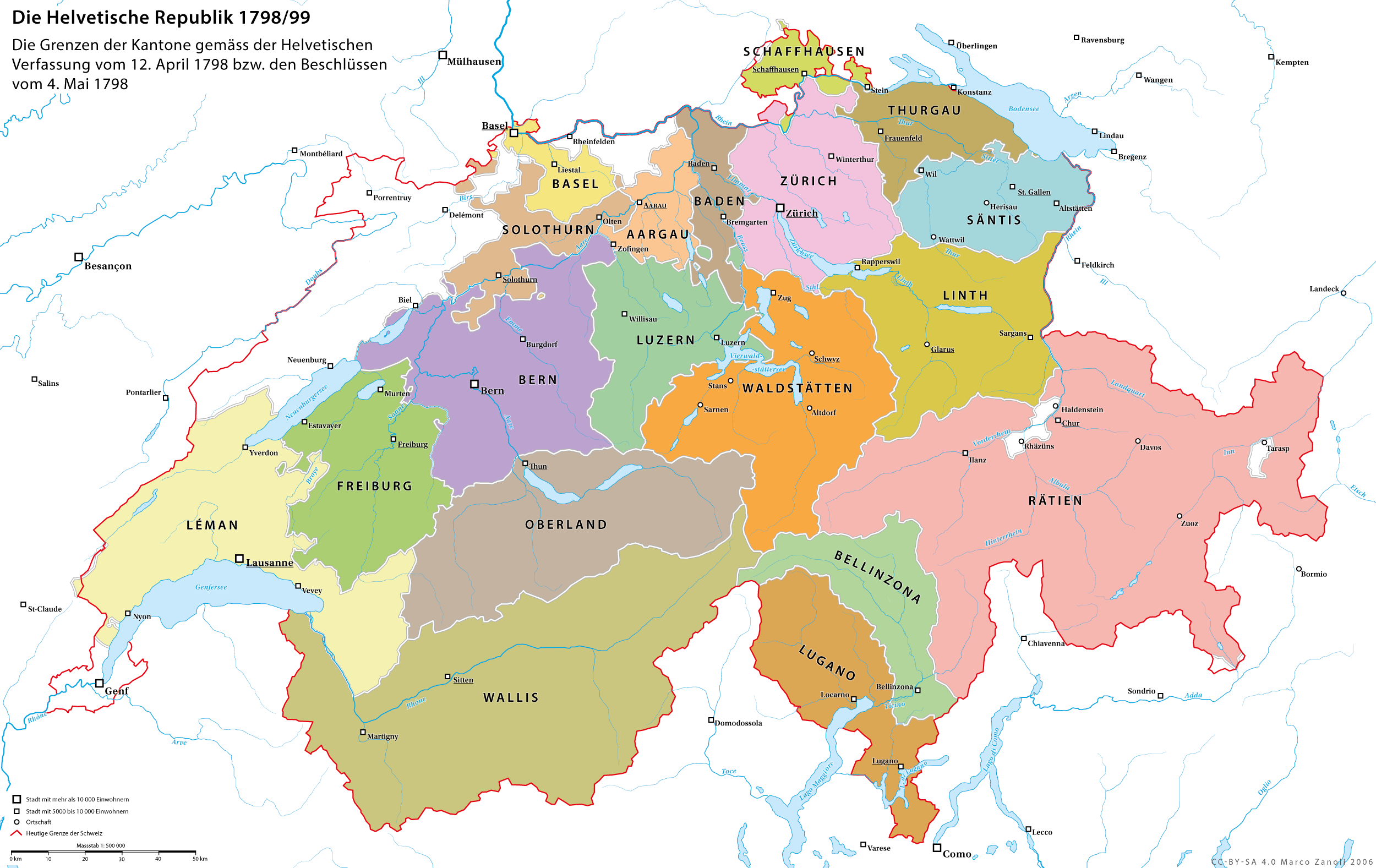
- The Helvetic Republic, as at the constitution of 12 April 1798, showing the Canton of Baden in dark brown, top-centre.
- Capital: Baden bei Zürich
- History
  - Canton established: April 11, 1798
  - Helv. Rep. proclaimed: April 12, 1798; 228 years ago
  - Helvetic Republic and Canton disestablished: February 19, 1803 1803
Preceded by
County of Baden	County of Baden
Freie Ämter	Freie Ämter
Kelleramt	de:Kelleramt
Succeeded by
Aargau
- Today part of: Switzerland
- Note: Small parts of the canton were added to Lucerne and Zürich

The Canton of Baden (German: Kanton Baden) was a canton of the Helvetic Republic (a Napoleonic-era precursor of modern-day Switzerland). Its capital was the town of Baden bei Zürich (Baden im Aargau).

== Formation ==
The canton was created in 1798 from the merger of the County of Baden with the Freie Ämter (free bailiwicks) and Kelleramt, all of which had until then been condominiums (gemeine Herrschaften) of the Old Swiss Confederation.

The canton was divided into five districts — Baden, Bremgarten, Muri, Sarmenstorf and Zurzach. The canton, like the others of the Helvetic Republic, was administered by a governor (German: Statthalter) and an administrative chamber (German: Verwaltungskammer), a vice-governor (German: Unterstatthalter) in each district, as well as agents in the municipalities. In 1799, there were 45,982 residents, though the Jewish population was not counted in the census.

== Dissolution ==
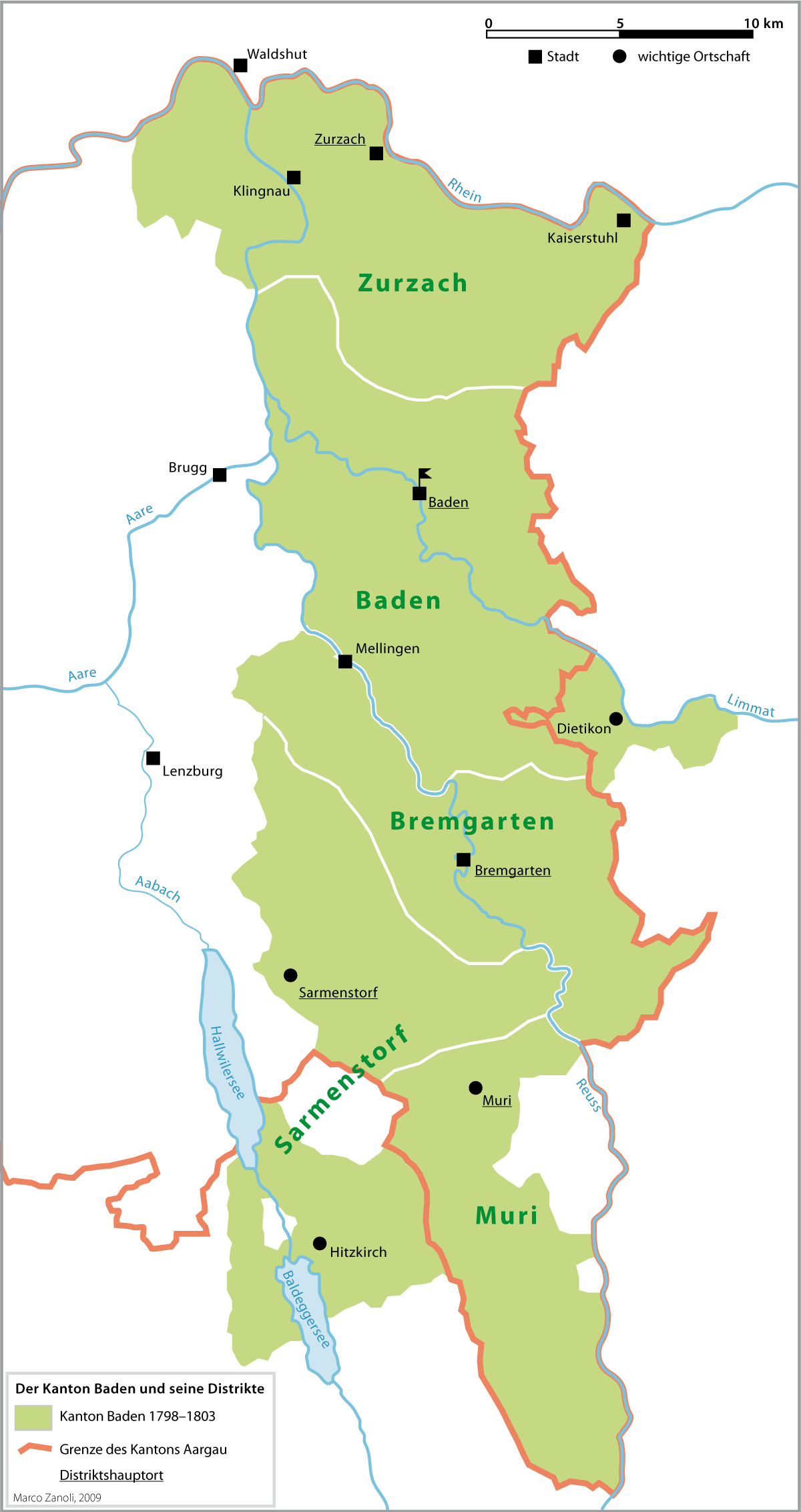
The former canton and its districts (shaded green) shown with the canton of Aargau (1803 — ).

Since the majority of Roman Catholic, conservative population were indifferent to the new state, officials and politicians had to be imported from neighboring cantons. The canton was divided and some municipalities sought affiliations with other cantons: the Lutheran congregations in the Limmattal wanted to affiliate with Zürich, the Amt of Hitzkirch with Lucerne, and the upper Freiamt with Zug or Schwyz.

The canton was not politically viable, notably due to its lack of an economic base; in both 1801 (Constitution of Malmaison) and 1802 (Second Helvetic Constitution), it was decided to merge the canton into Aargau, but the move was not completed. Napoleon Bonaparte signed the Act of Mediation on 19 February 1803 and, in the process, the canton of Baden was dissolved and united with the cantons of Aargau and Fricktal, forming the contemporary canton of Aargau.

Some parts of the canton of Baden at this point were transferred to other cantons: the Amt of Hitzkirch to Lucerne, whilst Hüttikon, Oetwil an der Limmat, Dietikon and Schlieren went to Zürich. In return, Lucerne's Amt of Merenschwand was transferred to Aargau (district of Muri).

== Contemporary districts ==
The former canton can still be identified with the contemporary Aargau districts of Zurzach, Baden, Bremgarten and Muri (albeit with the gains and losses in 1803 as detailed above).
