= Vogtei Rheintal =

Condominium of the Old Swiss Confederacy

Bailiwick of the Rhine Valley Vogtei Rheintal
- 1464–1798
- Coat of arms

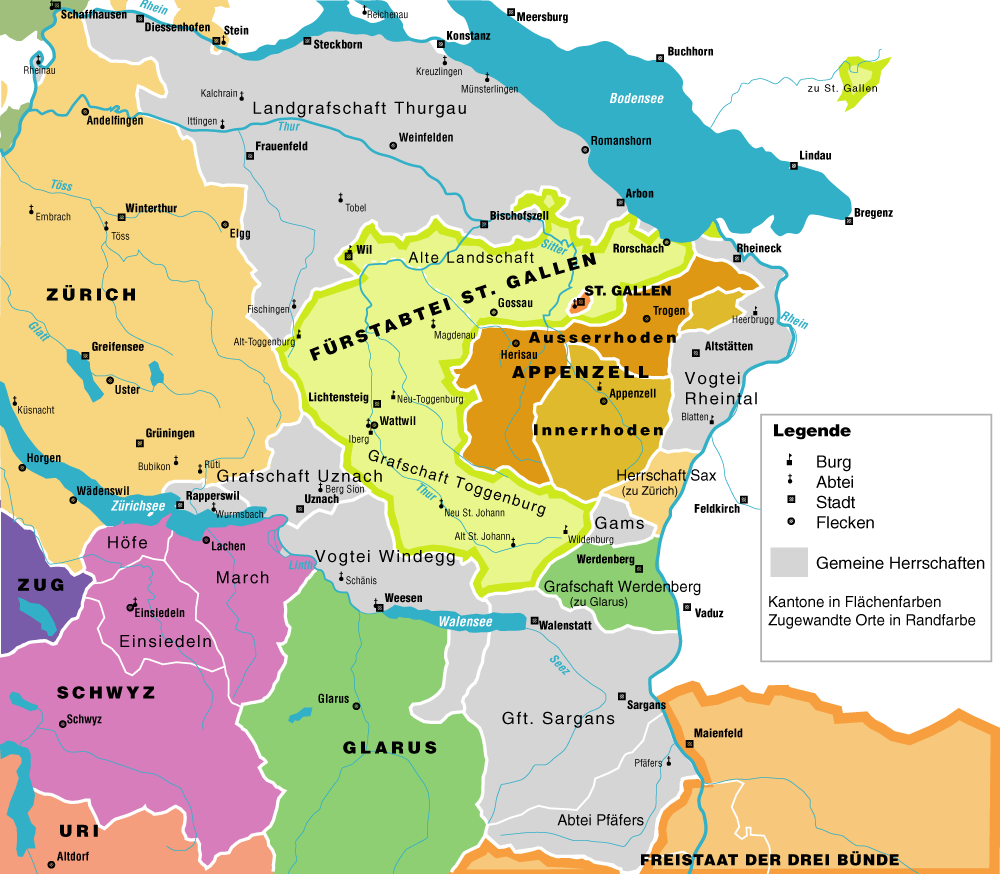
- Eastern Switzerland in 1798, showing the Bailiwick of the Rhine Valley in grey to the right, south of Lake Constance and labelled Vogtei Rheintal
- Status: State of the Holy Roman Empire, Condominium of the Old Swiss Confederacy
- Capital: Altstätten, Kriessern
- Government: Principality
- Historical era: Middle Ages
  - Rheintal united under county of Werdenberg: ← 1348
  - Acquired by Habsburgs: ← 1363–95 1464
  - Conquered by the canton of Appenzell: ← 1405–08
  - Conquered by the county of Toggenburg: ← 1424
  - Conquered by Swiss and Imp. Abbey St Gall: → 1464
  - Declared independence: March 26, 1798
  - Annexed to the Helvetic canton of Säntis: → May 1798 1798
  - Joined canton of St. Gallen: → February 19, 1803
Preceded by	Succeeded by
Toggenburg / County of Toggenburg	Canton of Säntis

Vogtei Rheintal (lit. 'Bailiwick of the Rhine Valley') was a condominium of the Old Swiss Confederacy from the 15th century until 1798. Its territory corresponded to the left banks of the Alpine Rhine between Hoher Kasten and Lake Constance, including the towns of Altstätten and Rheineck.

Vogtei Rheintal is presently part of the canton of St. Gallen, specifically and primarily in the constituency of Rheintal.

== Establishment ==
During the Appenzell Wars, the defeat by Appenzell in the Battle of Stoss Pass, 17 June 1405 put an end to the Habsburg expansion (and won Appenzeller independence from the Imperial Abbey of St Gall). Marbach, Berneck and Altstätten allied with Appenzell in the Bund ob dem See, in the first union of the Rhine Valley from Rheineck to Kriessern. Appenzeller defeat in the Battle of Bregenz three years later brought an end to this new-found liberty and restored the Habsburgs. By 1424, however, the Rhine Valley was largely in the hands of the counts of Toggenburg. After their extinction, Appenzell reconquered the Rheintal with Rheineck in the Old Zürich War in 1445.

In 1464, Appenzell protected the Rheintal from the territorial claims of the prince-abbot of St Gall, particularly in a series of battles at the time of the "Rorschacher Klosterbruch", the casus belli for the St Gallerkrieg between 28 July 1489 and the spring of 1490. Nevertheless, Appenzell was forced to cede the governing protectorship of the Valley to the warring powers — the Abbey and the four cantons of Glarus, Lucerne, Schwyz and Zürich — bringing the bailiwick into the ambit of the Old Swiss Confederation as a Gemeine Herrschaft (condominium).

The following year, the vier Orte were joined by Uri, Unterwalden and Zug in the government of the condominium. Appenzell regained its seat in the governing protectorship in 1500 and Bern. The prince-abbot also sat in the court, in Kriessern.

== Swiss Reformation ==
In 1528, the Swiss Reformation was accepted in the Rheintal; whilst Roman Catholic minorities remained, only Altstätten, Widnau, Kriessern and Rüthi had a Catholic majority. Through the defeat of the Catholic hegemony over Switzerland and the end of the lengthy religious disputes that had riven the Confederacy, the 11 August 1712 Peace of Aarau (German: Frieden von Aarau) established confessional parity, allowing both religions to coexist in legal equality — a concept relatively common to the Holy Roman Empire since the Peace of Westphalia in 1648.

== Independence ==
In 1798, the Vogtei Rheintal unilaterally declared its independence. In the aftermath of the collapse of the Old Swiss Confederation resulting from the French invasion of Switzerland. On 26 March 1798, a Landsgemeinde in Altstätten promulgated a constitution and elected both a magistrate (German: Landammann) and a council (German: Landsrat). Within weeks, however, this nascent independence was quashed with the inclusion of the Rheintal into the Helvetic canton of Säntis, with the exception of Rüthi and Lienz, assigned to Linth.

With Napoleon's Act of Mediation on 19 February 1803, the Helvetic Republic and its cantonal boundaries were abolished, with the Rheintal reunited as a district of the canton of St. Gallen, stretching from Staad to Lienz and with its capital alternating monthly between Altstätten and Rheineck.
