= Canton of Säntis =

St. Gallen, Appenzell and Rheintal (1798–1803)

Canton of Säntis Kanton Säntis
- Canton of the Helvetic Republic
- 1798–1803
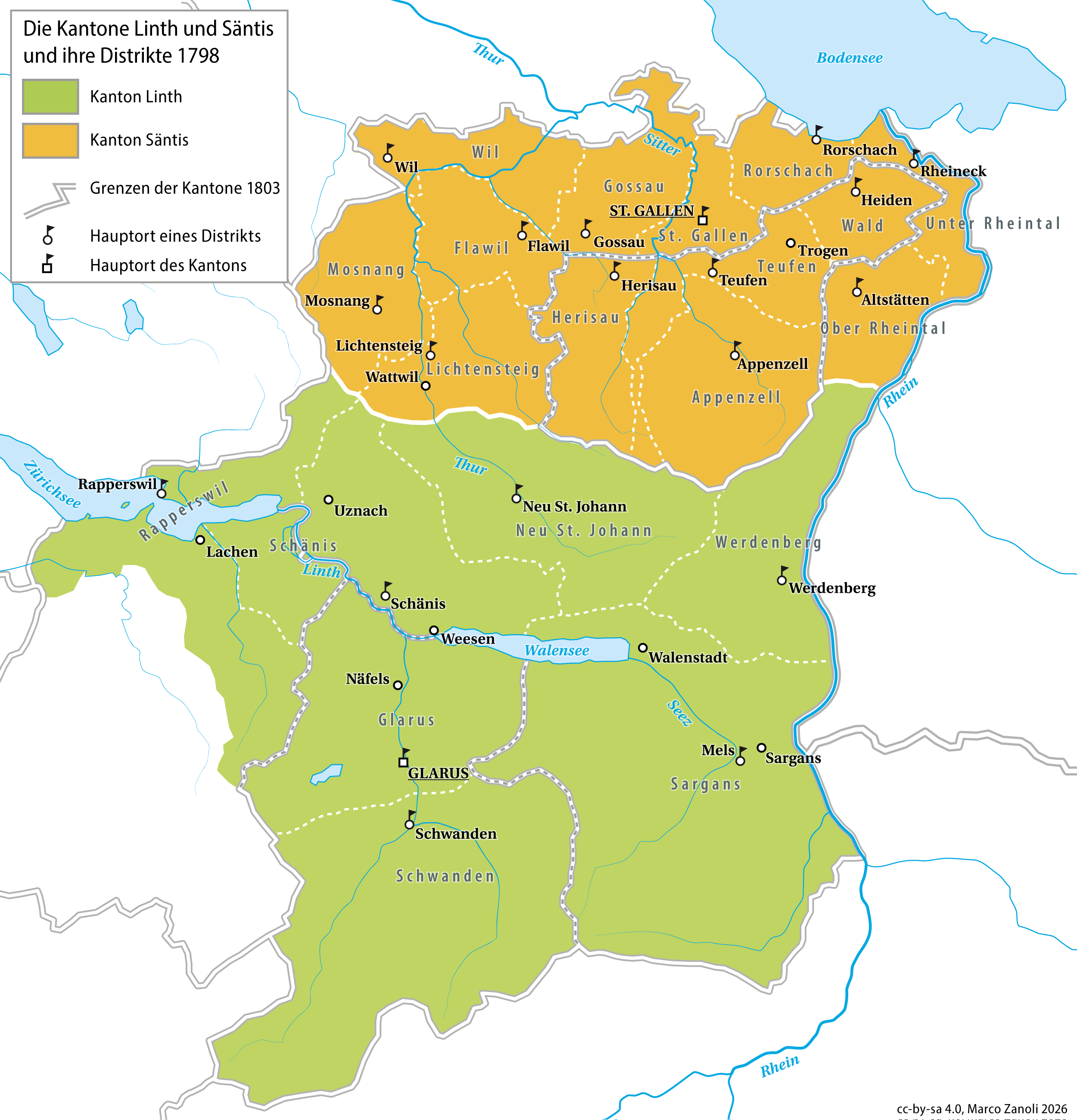
- Cantons of Säntis (orange) and Linth (green)
- Capital: St. Gallen
- Area
  - Coordinates: 47°25′23″N 9°22′36″E
- History
  - Helv. Rep. established: 1798
  - Helv. Rep. disestablished: 19 February
Preceded by
Imperial Abbey of St. Gall
Imperial City of St. Gallen
Vogtei of Rheintal
Appenzell Innerrhoden
Appenzell Ausserrhoden
Succeeded by
Canton of St. Gallen
Appenzell Innerrhoden
Appenzell Ausserrhoden

Säntis was the name of a canton of the Helvetic Republic from 1798 to 1803, consisting of the territory of St. Gallen, Appenzell, and Rheintal. Its capital was St. Gallen, and it was named for the Säntis mountain (pronounced [ˈzɛntɪs]).

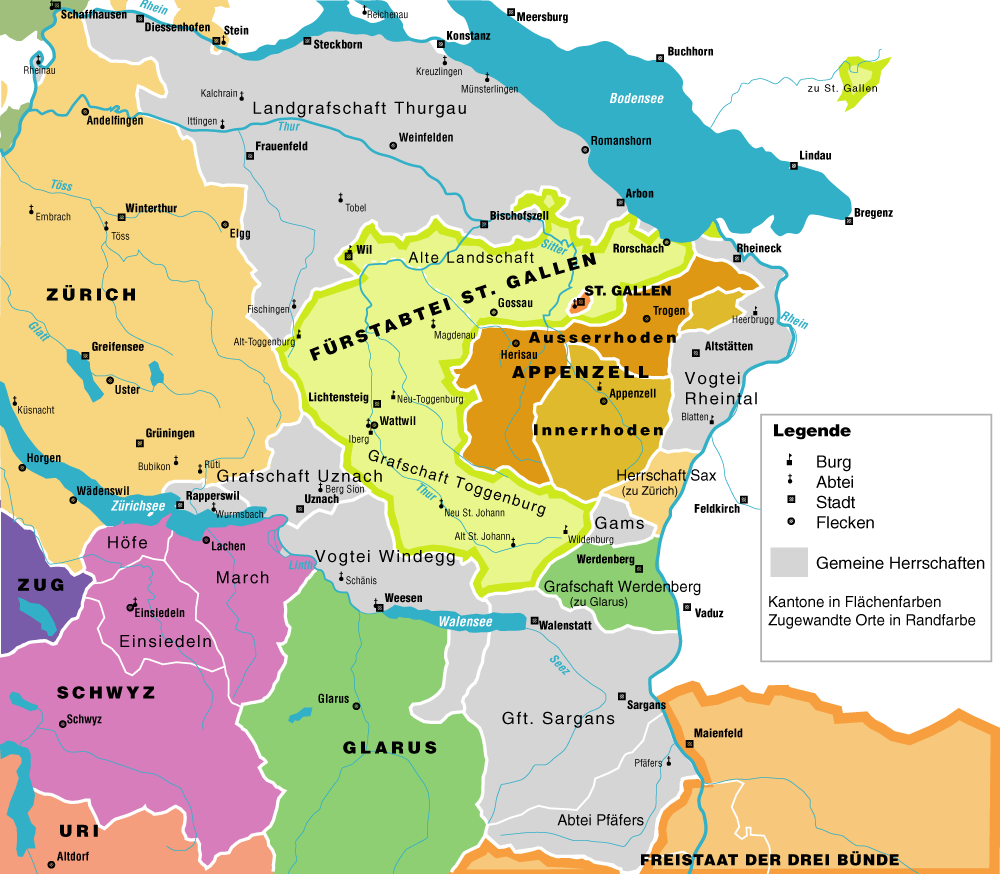
Eastern Switzerland in 1798, with shared territories in grey and associate members of the Confederacy outlined Imperial Abbey of St. Gall Free Imperial City of St. Gallen Appenzell Ausserrhoden Appenzell Innerrhoden Shared territories of the Confederacy Canton of Glarus and the County of Werdenberg Canton of Zürich and Lordship of Sax Three Leagues Canton of Schwyz
