= Rheintal (disambiguation) =

Rheintal is the Rhine Valley in Europe.

Rheintal may also refer to:

- Alpine Rhine Valley (German: Alpenrheintal), a glacial alpine valley in Europe
- Rheintal (Wahlkreis), a constituency of the canton of St. Gallen, Switzerland
- Vogtei Rheintal, a condominium of the Old Swiss Confederacy from the 15th century until 1798

== See also ==
- Rhine, a European river
