= Freie Ämter =

Region in Switzerland

Freiamt Freie Ämter
- 1415–1798
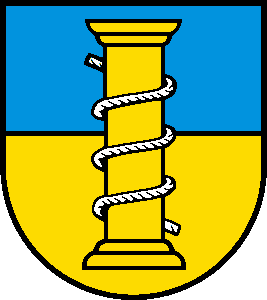
- Coat of arms

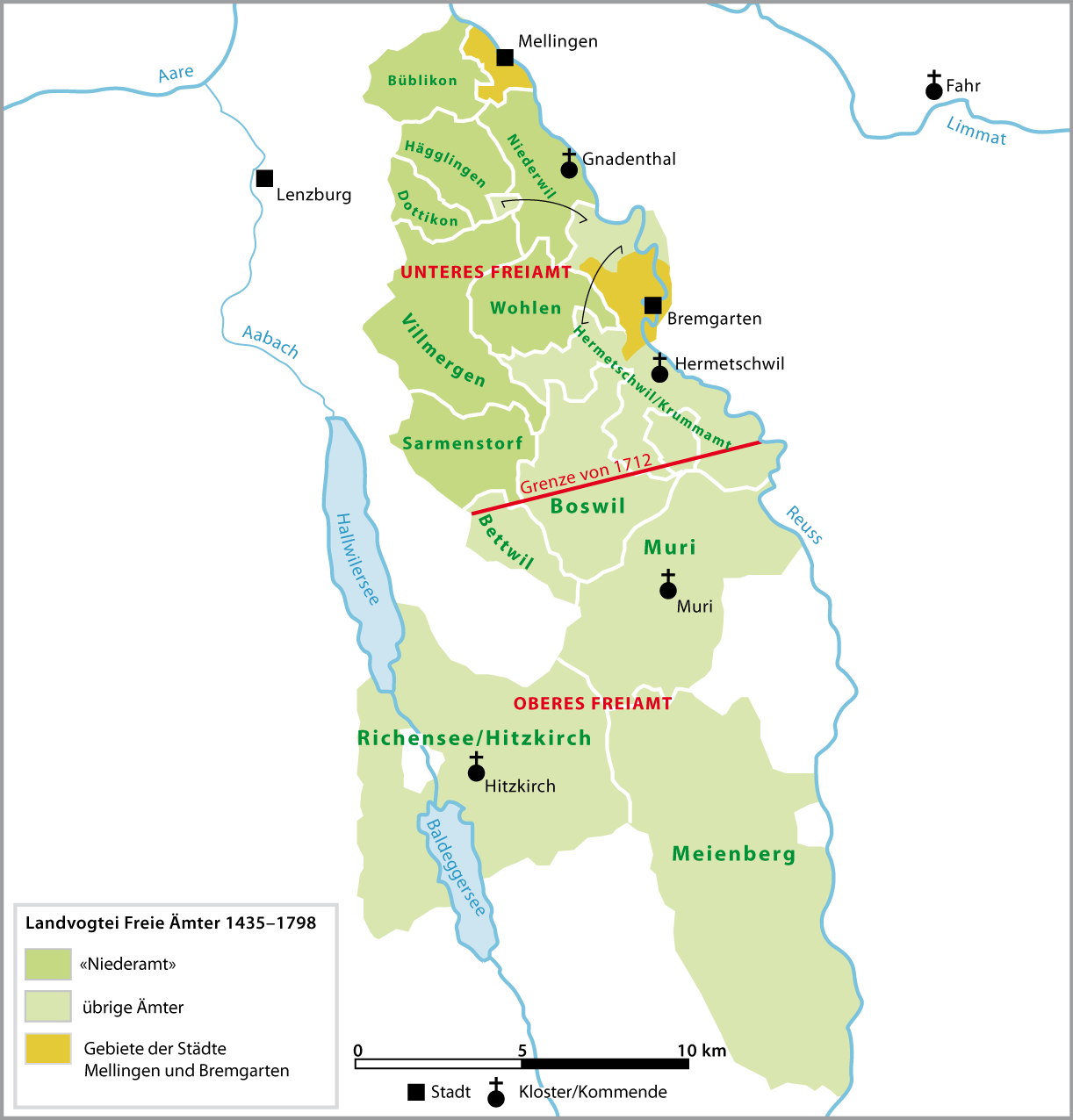
- Map of the bailiwick of the Freie Ämter in the Old Swiss Confederacy 1435–1798
- Status: Subject of the Old Swiss Confederacy
- History
  - Established: 1415
  - Disestablished: 1798
Preceded by	Succeeded by
Archduchy of Austria	Canton of Baden

The Freiamt or Freie Ämter (English: Free Office or Free Administrative Unit, though it is not usually translated into English) is a region in Switzerland and is located in the southeast of Canton of Aargau. It comprises the area between the Lindenberg and Heitersberg and from the terminal moraine at Othmarsingen to Reuss river in Dietwil. Today the area of the Bremgarten and Muri Districts are called the Freiamt. Previously, the area around Affoltern District in the canton of Zurich was called the (Zurich) Freiamt.

Bremgarten, Muri, Sins, Villmergen and Wohlen are among the main towns of the Freiamt. The metropolitan area around the Mutschellen pass is another important population center.

According to statistical criteria, there is only one city, Wohlen. During the Middle Ages, Bremgarten had city rights, but it is not currently classed as a city. The Freiamt lies in a central position in the Swiss Plateau. The large cities of Zurich, Zug and Lucerne are all within a half-hour's drive from the Freiamt.

== Origin of the name ==
A Freiamt in the Middle Ages is not a specified area, but a union of persons or free peasants who had a local court or limited self-government. The term is found in the Alamanni populated areas, including the Black Forest of southern Germany (from the 3rd century) and the Swiss plateau (from the 6th Century). The term comes from the Alemannic legal breakdown between free and unfree, which in the Early Middle Ages included the rights of autonomy.

The Aargau Freie Ämter were territories that were under Habsburg rule but were independent with respect to low justice and common law, and so under the medieval definition, they were "free".

== History ==
=== Before 1415 ===
In the Frankish-Carolingian era the territories to the left of the Reuss belonged to Aargau, while those to the right were part of Thurgau. Starting in the mid 9th century this area became known as the Zürichgau. After the extinction of the Counts of Lenzburg in 1170, their land in the Aargau went to the Habsburgs. During the 10th century, they acquired vast tracts of land in the region. The Habsburgs granted the low justice rights over many of the villages to Hermetschwil and Muri Abbeys.

After the Swiss Confederation became independent from the Habsburgs, the new Confederation began to expand. After the expansion to the Acht Orte (Eight Cantons), they began looking for additional territory. As the city of Lucerne grew in power, they became interested in the southern portion of what would become the Freie Ämter. In 1394 they acquired the Amt of Merenschwand which gave Lucerne an exclave west of the river Reuss. In the Battle of Sempach, the Habsburg villages of Aristau and Meienberg were destroyed. Following the defeat of 1386, and despite the 1394 peace between the Habsburgs and the Confederation, the Habsburg city of Bremgarten entered into an alliance with Bern in 1407.

=== Conquest of the Aargau ===
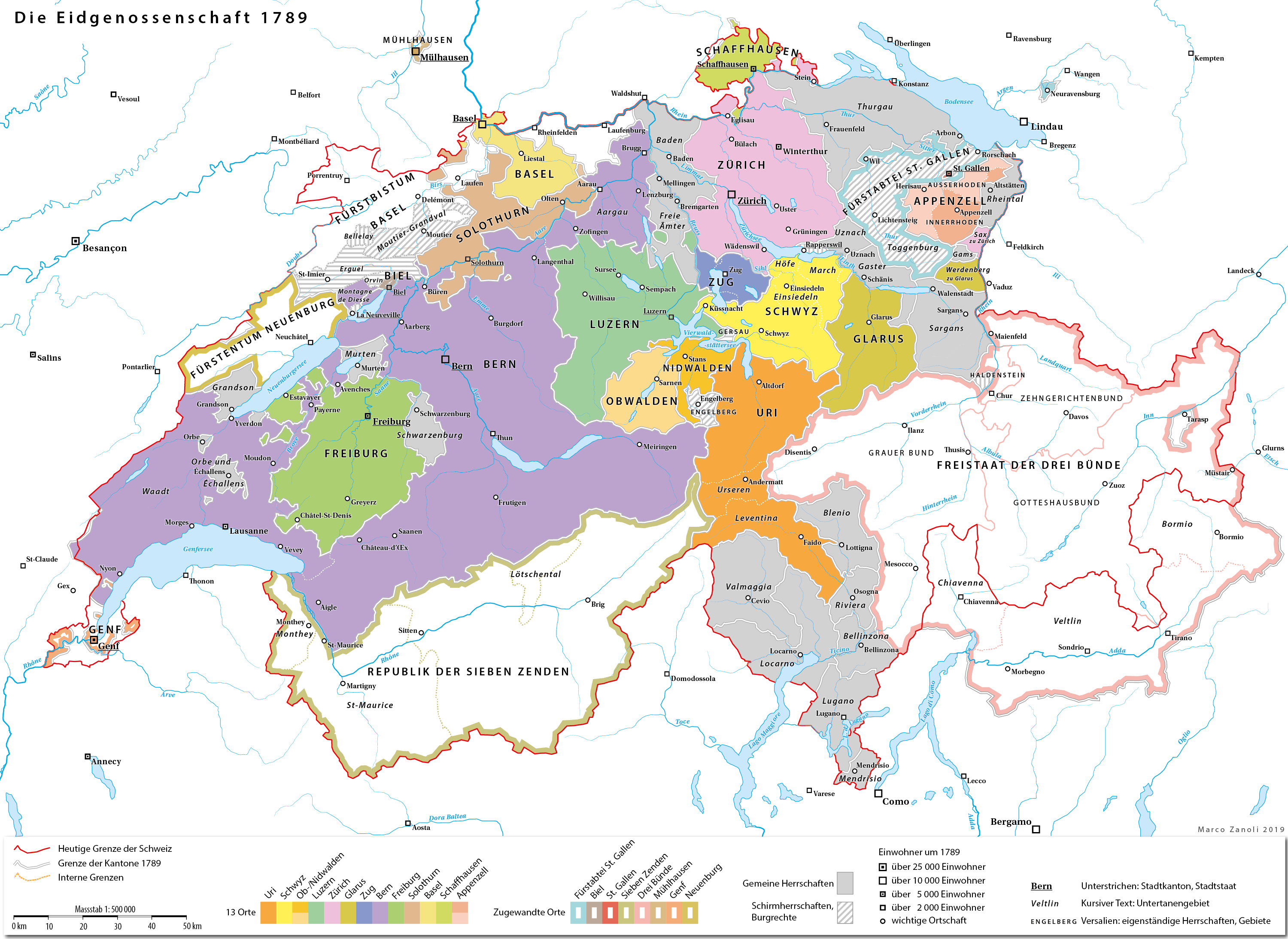
The Old Swiss Confederation, showing the situation of the Freie Ämter

On 16 November 1414, Emperor Sigismund called the Council of Constance to settle the Western Schism between the three popes (Benedict XIII, Gregory XII, and John XXIII), all of whom claimed legitimacy. Frederick IV of Habsburg sided with John XXIII. When John XXIII was declared an antipope, he fled the city with Frederick's help. The emperor then declared the Habsburg lands forfeited and ordered the neighboring countries to conquer those lands for the emperor. The city-state of Bern had already pledged their support of the emperor against the Habsburgs in 1414, and so they were ready to invade. The rest of the Confederation quickly followed.

The territory was quickly conquered in 1415 by the Confederation. Under Habsburg rule Aargau was divided into multiple sections (German: Ämter), which were maintained under the Confederation. Bern, Lucerne and Zurich were each given a portion of the conquered region to administer. The rest of the Freie Ämter were collectively administered as subject territories by the rest of the Confederation – effectively a condominium. Muri Amt was assigned to Zurich, Lucerne, Schwyz, Unterwalden, Zug and Glarus, while the Ämter of Meienberg, Richensee and Villmergen were first given to Lucerne alone. The final boundary was set in 1425 by an arbitration tribunal and Lucerne had to give the three Ämter to be collectively ruled. The four Ämter were then consolidated under a single Confederation bailiff into what was known in the 15th century as the Waggental Bailiwick (German: Vogtei im Waggental). In the 16th century, it came to be known as the Vogtei der Freien Ämter. While the Freien Ämter often had independent lower courts, they were forced to accept the Confederation's sovereignty. Finally, in 1532 the canton of Uri became part of the collective administration of the Freien Ämter.

=== From the Reformation to the creation of Aargau ===
At the time of Reformation the majority of the Ämter converted to the new faith. In 1529 a wave of iconoclasm swept through the area and wiped away much of the old religion. After the defeat of Zurich in the second Battle of Kappel in 1531, the victorious five Catholic cantons marched their troops into the Freie Ämter and reconverted them to Catholicism.

In the First War of Villmergen, in 1656, and the Toggenburg War (or Second War of Villmergen), in 1712, the Freie Ämter became the staging ground for the warring Reformed and Catholic armies. While the peace after the 1656 war did not change the status quo, the fourth Peace of Aarau in 1712 brought about a reorganization of power relations. The victory gave Zurich the opportunity to force the Catholic cantons out of the government in the county of Baden and the adjacent area of the Freie Ämter. The Freie Ämter were then divided in two by a line drawn from the gallows in Fahrwangen to the Oberlunkhofen church steeple. The northern part, the so-called Unteren Freie Ämter (lower Freie Ämter), which included the districts of Boswil (in part) and Hermetschwil and the Niederamt, were ruled by Zurich, Bern and Glarus. The southern part, the Oberen Freie Ämter (upper Freie Ämter), were ruled by the previous seven cantons but Bern was added to make an eighth.

During the Helvetic Republic (1798-1803) the county of Baden, the Freie Ämter and the region known as the Kelleramt were combined into a new Canton of Baden. In 1803 the cantons of Baden and Fricktal merged into the canton of Aargau.

=== Since the creation of Aargau ===
In 1830 Aargau was rocked by the Freiämtersturm, an uprising of the rural population in the region. Many residents of the Freie Ämter marched on the cantonal capital of Aarau to demand changes in the cantonal constitution. After the Freie Ämter militia surrounded government buildings, the government quickly negotiated an end of the uprising. They agreed to a full revision of the constitution and all the other demands of the militia. This, together with other uprisings in 1830–31 led to the end of the Restoration period and the beginning of the liberal Regeneration period. The changes during the Regeneration led to the creation of the Federal State in 1848.
