= Rorschacher Klosterbruch =

1489-90 Swiss conflict

St. Gallerkrieg Rorschacher Klosterbruch
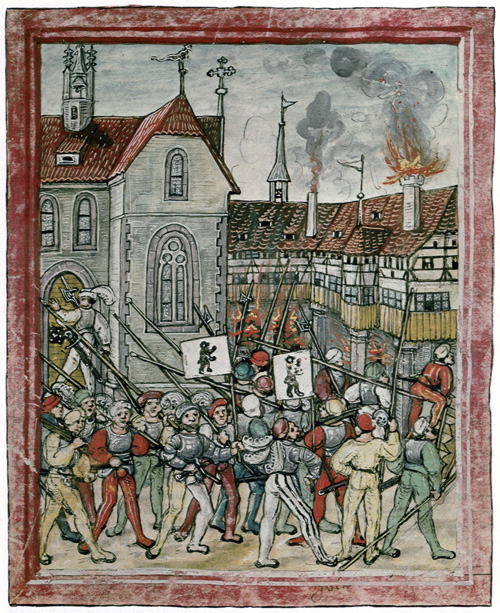
- Appenzell and St. Gallen troops attack Mariaberg Monastery in Rorschach. Amtliche Luzerner Chronik, 1513
Date	28 July 1489 – Spring 1490
Location	Rorschach 47°28′N 9°29′E
Result	Swiss/Abbey victory Vogtei Rheintal became a condominium of the Old Swiss Confederacy

Belligerents
Abbey of St. Gall; Zürich; Lucerne; Schwyz Glarus	Appenzell City of St. Gallen

Commanders and leaders
Prince-Abbot; Ulrich Rösch	Ulrich Varnbüler

Strength
Unknown	8,000

Casualties and losses
Light	Light
- Location of Mariaberg Monastery Rorschacher Klosterbruch (Switzerland)

The Rorschacher Klosterbruch or St. Gallerkrieg was a war between the Abbey of Saint Gall, Zürich, Lucerne, Schwyz and Glarus against the city of St. Gallen and Appenzell in 1489 to 1490.

== Background ==
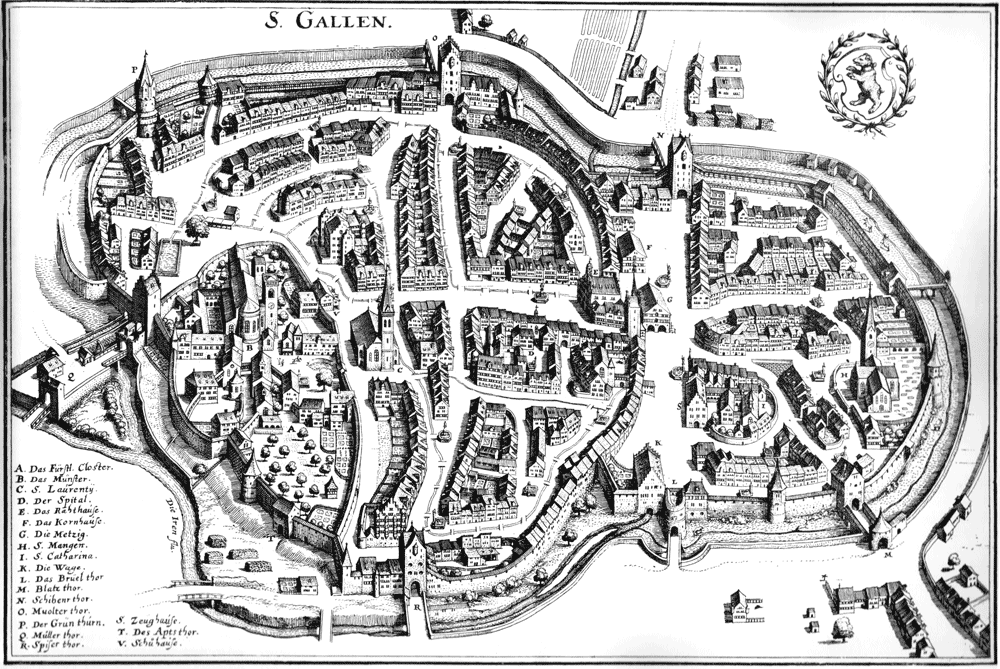
City of St. Gallen in 1642, abbey territory on the left.

Following the Appenzell victory in 1408 during the Appenzell Wars, the Abbey of St. Gall lost much of their power and wealth. By 1412 there were only two monks left at the Abbey, one of which elected the other as Abbot. As a result, over the following decades the abbots of St. Gall aggressively expanded their lands and influence in the region. In 1442 the town used a visit of Emperor Frederick III to throw off much of the Abbey's power over them. The leaders of the town swore loyalty to the Emperor. Then, in the same year when Kaspar von Landenberg was appointed Abbot over the Abbey, they declared that they could not swear loyalty to him because they already had to the Emperor. Under Kaspar, the Abbey spent money wastefully and was quickly deep in debt. To help rein in the abbot's spending and to further expand their independence, in 1451 the Abbey allied with Zurich, Lucerne, Schwiz and Glarus and forced Kaspar to appoint a cellarer, Ulrich Rösch. In 1454 the town also allied with the Swiss. Abbot Kaspar fought often with Ulrich and in 1458 appealed to the Pope to be rid of Ulrich. However, the decision was given to Cardinal Aeneas Sylvius, who sided with Ulrich and allowed Abbot Kaspar to retain the title, but turned day-to-day operations over to Ulrich. When Abbot Kaspar died in 1463, Ulrich appointed himself Abbot Ulrich VIII and began trying to force the town back under control of the Abbey. Over the next two decades, Abbot Ulrich continued expanding the power and land holdings of the Abbey. He repaired and expanded many of the monastery buildings. His ambitions often brought him into conflict with the town.

At the same time the leaders of the town had become wealthy from weaving and trading fabric. In the early 1460s, Ulrich Varnbüler was a rising star in the town. During the Burgundian Wars, he ably led the St. Gallen army and in the Battle of Grandson (1476) his troops were part of the advance units of the Confederation and took part in their famous attack. A large painting of Ulrich returning triumphantly to a hero's welcome in St. Gallen is still displayed in St. Gallen. After the war, Varnbüler often represented St. Gallen at the various parliaments of the Confederation. In December 1480, Varnbüler was offered the position of mayor for the first time. From that time on, he served in several leadership positions and was considered the city's intellectual and political leader. His position as mayor often brought him into conflict with Abbot Ulrich Rösch.

In late 1480, Abbot Ulrich Rösch began planning to move the abbey away from the city of St. Gallen to a new location near the village of Rorschach near Lake Constance. By moving he hoped to escape the independence and conflict in the city. Additionally, by moving closer to the important lake trade routes, he could make Rorschach into a major harbor and collect a fortune in taxes. In turn Mayor Varnbüler and the city feared that a new harbor on the lake would cause trade to bypass St. Gallen and Appenzell. They would then be forced to go through the Prince-Bishop's harbor to sell their fabric. Though the city of St. Gallen and Appenzell opposed the new monastery, after the approval of Pope Sixtus IV and protracted negotiations with Emperor Friedrich III the corner stone of the new Mariaberg Abbey was laid on 21 March 1487.

== The battles ==
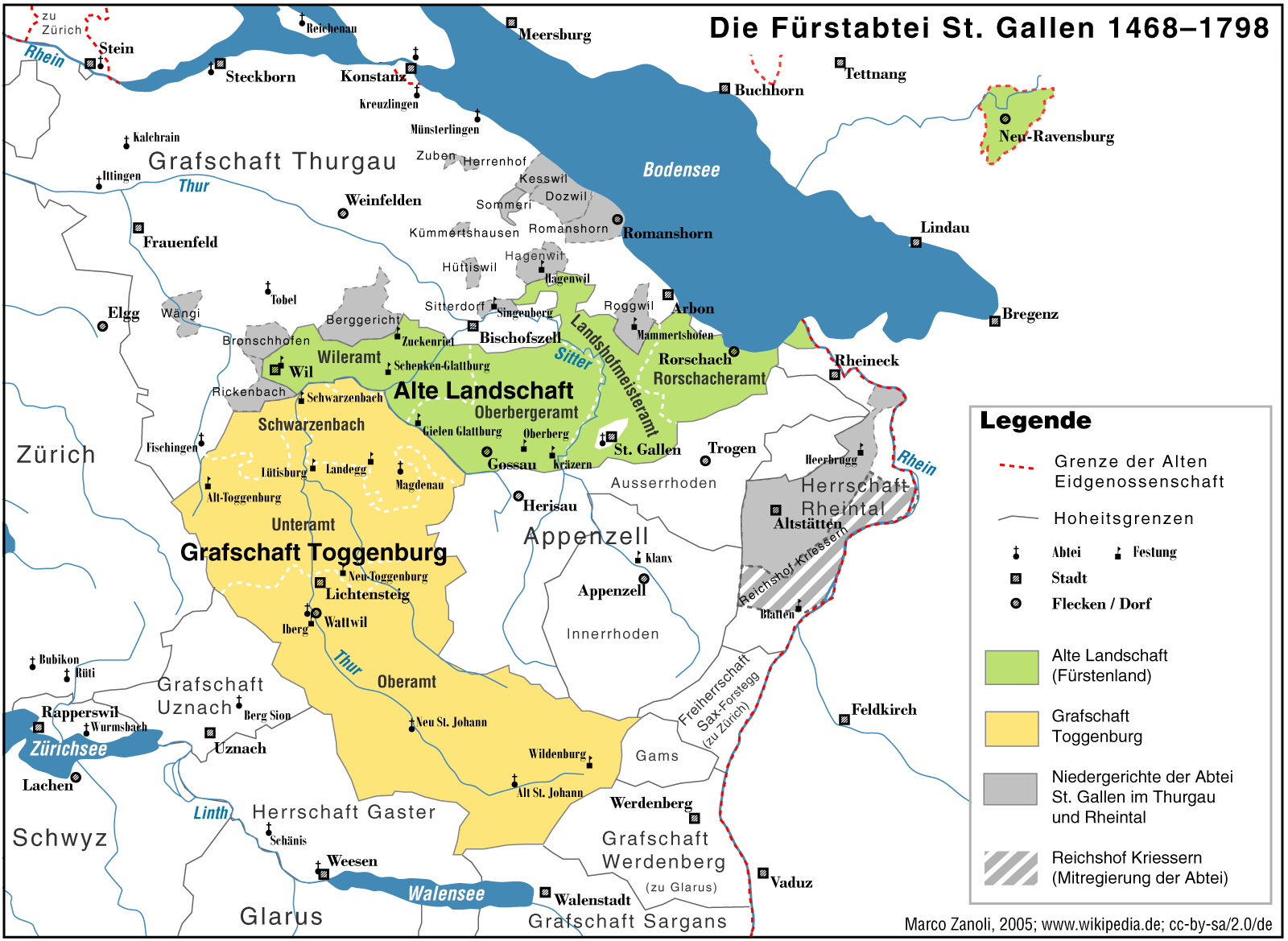
Lands of Abbey of St. Gallen

The city created secret council to plan their response to the new abbey. As construction progressed they held secret negotiations with the Appenzellers. At first they simply protested the Abbot's plan, but when that went nowhere, they began planning an attack on the abbey. They believed that the Swiss Confederation would not intervene due to tensions between them and the Swabian League. On 28 July 1489 a group of 1200 Appenzellers and 350 St. Galleners assembled at Grub (now part of Eggersriet) and marched on the Abbey. They had kept their planning so secret that they achieved total surprise. They quickly tore down the walls and burned everything they could find. After spending the night drinking and feasting on the abbot's supplies, they returned to their homes. The attack cost the Abbot the 13,000 gulden he had already spent on construction along with an additional 3,000 in furniture and supplies. The Abbey's vassals were supportive of the actions of the city and Appenzell and on 21 October 1489 signed the Waldkircher Bund with the rebels. Soon after signing the alliance, a small force began an unsuccessful siege of Rorschach Castle.

The Abbot spent the following months seeking support from his allies in the Old Swiss Confederation to punish St. Gallen and Appenzell. Initially he had little success. While the four allied cantons (Zürich, Lucerne, Schwyz and Glarus) generally supported the Abbot, the remainder of the Confederacy did not. However, the creation of the Waldkircher Bund appeared threatening to the Confederacy and moved it to support the Abbot. On 24 January 1490, the Confederacy allowed the four cantons to attack the city and Appenzell. On 27 January the city of Zug attempted to host another peace meeting, but was unsuccessful. The armies of the four cantons were already moving toward St. Gallen.

On 4 February about 8,000 soldiers from the four cantons assembled in Wil. On the following day, St. Gallen and Appenzell troops were supposed to assemble at Gossau. However, Appenzell chose to keep their forces behind their letzi or wall near Herisau and the defenders near Gossau melted away. The four canton troops marched toward Gossau, relieving the siege of Rorschach Castle on 8 February. The following day Hermann Zidler, the Appenzell leader, appeared at the four cantons' camp and negotiated a peace treaty. Around the same time, the Abbey's vassals chose to leave the Waldkircher Bund, leaving St. Gallen alone to face the Swiss Confederation. On 11–12 February the Confederation troops encircled St. Gallen and burned the town outside the city walls. By this time St. Gallen had requested support from the Swabian Bund, who sent 10,000 men toward St. Gallen; these did not arrive in time to have any impact, however. Over the next few days both sides fired on each other with limited effect. One chronicle records that within the city one man was killed and two wounded but over 30 were killed in the besieging army, though that number is probably exaggerated. After several days of negotiations, on February 15 both sides signed a peace treaty, ending the St. Gallen War.

== Aftermath ==
The February treaty dissolved the Waldkircher Bund and returned all lands and possessions to everyone involved with one exception. Ulrich Varnbüler was stripped of all his property outside the city of St. Gallen and was banished from the Confederation. Additionally the town clerk, Hans Schenkli, was to be either tried and executed or banished. On 7 March both sides met in Einsiedeln to negotiate a final peace treaty. A treaty was signed between the city and the Abbot on 16 March, followed by a treaty with the Confederation and the city on 2 April. The treaties allowed the Abbot to build anything he wanted in Rorschach and to expand the Abbey in St. Gallen. The city had to pay the Abbot 4,000 gulden and the Confederation 10,000 gulden. The city lost the courts of Oberberg (by Gossau), Oberdorf, Andwil and Steinach. The Abbot also agreed to forgive everyone who joined the uprising, except for Varnbüler and Schenkli. Appenzell had to give the Rheintal Vogtei to the Confederation, which administered it as a condominium of the entire Confederation, except for Bern.

Schenkli was arrested, but never brought to trial. By June he was living in the city on parole. At that time representatives of the four cantons met with him and demanded that the city exile him. The new mayor of St. Gallen and the city council convinced the representatives that they needed Schenkli and that he would not cause problems. The representatives accepted this and Schenkli returned to his office. Varnbüler fled to Innsbruck and then to Lindau, where he lived until his death in 1495 or 1496.

Mariaberg Monastery was rebuilt starting in 1497 and completed 1518. But it only served the monastery of St. Gallen as an administrative center and later became a school.
