= Canton of Fricktal =

Canton of the Helvetic Republic

Coordinates: 47°34′N 7°52′E

Canton of Fricktal Kanton Fricktal
- Canton of the Helvetic Republic
- 1802–1803
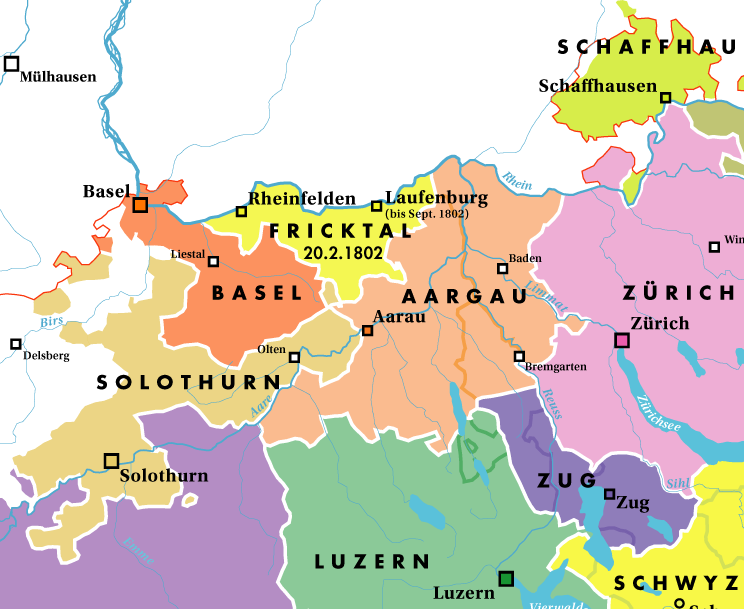
- The northern part of the Helvetic Republic in 1802, showing Fricktal in yellow, centre
- Capital: Laufenburg (to Sept 1802); Rheinfelden (after Sept 1802)
- History
  - Helv. Rep. established: April 12, 1798
  - Fricktal annexed to Helvetic Republic: 20 February 1802
  - Helv. Rep. disestablished: 19 February 1803
Preceded by	Succeeded by
Breisgau	Aargau
- Today part of: Switzerland

Fricktal was a canton of the Helvetic Republic from February 1802 to February 1803, consisting of that part of the Breisgau (previously part of Habsburg Further Austria) south of the Rhine ("the Fricktal"). Now, the territories of Fricktal form the districts of Rheinfelden and Laufenburg in the canton of Aargau.

In 1799, a year after the proclamation of the Helvetic Republic, French Revolutionary troops marched into the Fricktal. Thanks to good relations with leading French and Swiss politicians, the brothers Karl and Sebastian Fahrländer from Ettenheim and some colleagues were able to proclaim the creation of an independent canton of Fricktal, relying on the treaties of Campo Formio (1797) and Lunéville (1801) for the legal basis of this proclamation.

A constitution was written in the rectory of Eiken in December 1801; on 20 February 1802 the new canton was finally declared, with Laufenburg as its capital. This impetuous action of the governor Sebastian Fahrländer met with some criticism, however; his opponents met with community representatives in a guesthouse in Frick in September 1802 — the governor was unseated and the capital was relocated to Rheinfelden.

Despite intense diplomatic efforts by the protectors of Fricktal on 19 February 1803 to retain the canton's right of existence, exactly a year after its foundation, Napoleon Bonaparte decreed its merger with the cantons of Aargau and Baden on 19 March (forming the modern-day canton of Aargau), in the Act of Mediation, disestablishing the Helvetic Republic.

== Bibliography ==
- Patrick Bircher: Der Kanton Fricktal — Bauern, Bürger und Revolutionäre an der Wende vom 18. zum 19. Jahrhundert; Forum Fricktal, Laufenburg, 2002; ISBN 3-9522417-0-9
