= Canton of Linth =

Canton of the Helvetic Republic

Canton of Linth Kanton Linth
- Canton of the Helvetic Republic
- 1798–1803
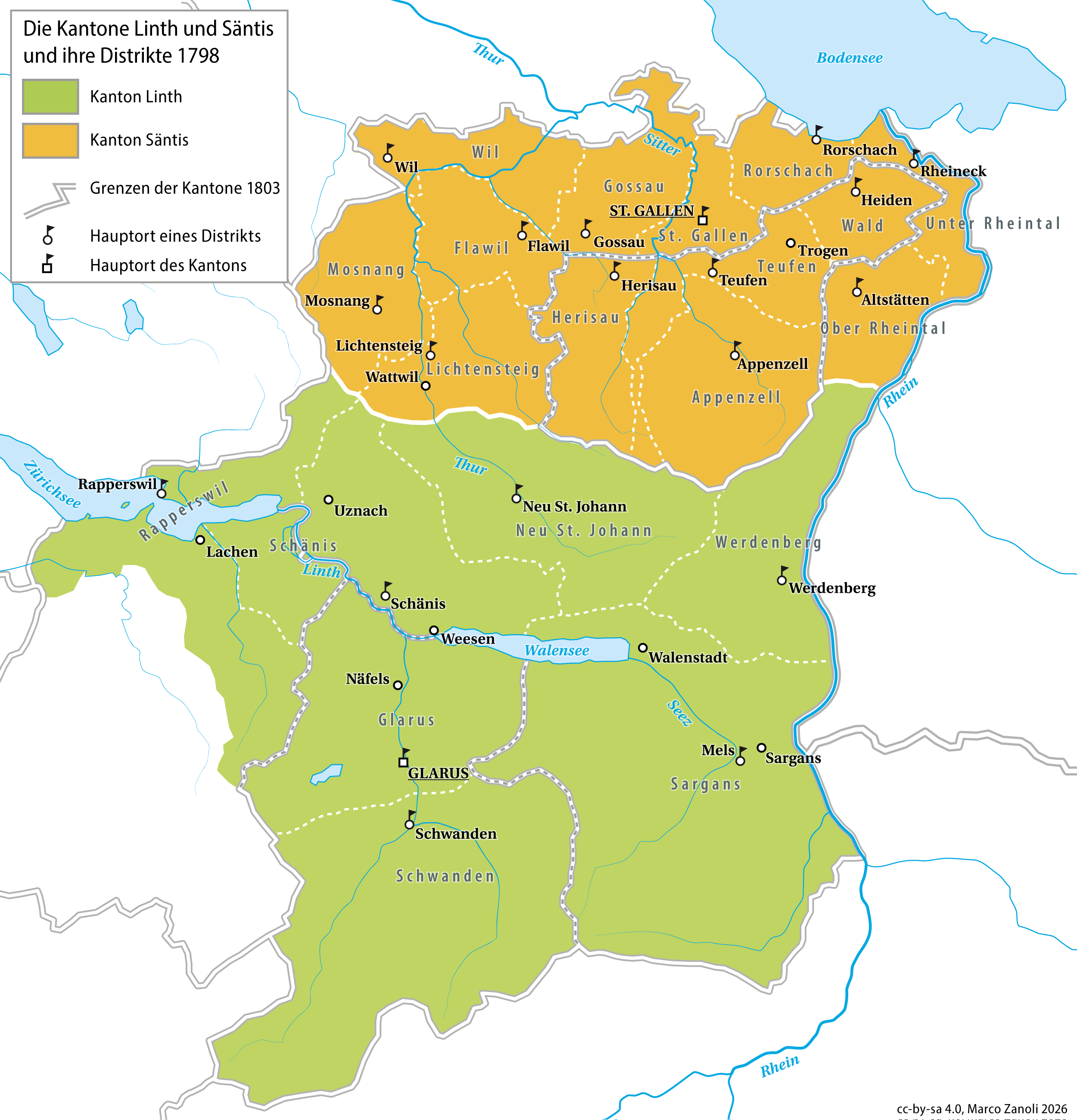
- Cantons of Säntis (orange) and Linth (green)
- Capital: Glarus
- History
  - Helv. Rep. proclaimed: April 12, 1798
  - Canton established: 17 June 1798
  - Helv. Rep. disestablished: 19 February
Preceded by
Glarus	Canton of Glarus
Schwyz	Canton of Schwyz
Uznach	County of Uznach
Toggenburg	County of Toggenburg
Werdenberg	County of Werdenberg
Succeeded by
Canton of St. Gallen	Canton of St. Gallen
Canton of Glarus	Glarus
Canton of Schwyz	Schwyz

Linth was a canton of the Helvetic Republic from 1798 to 1803, consisting of Glarus and its subject County of Werdenberg, the Höfe and March districts of Schwyz and the Züricher subject Lordship of Sax, along with a handful of shared territories. Its capital was Glarus. The canton was named after the Linth river.

== Administration ==
The canton contained approximately 78,500 inhabitants. Like all the cantons of the Helvetic Republic, Linth was established and administered on a French Revolutionary model. Linth and was divided administratively into seven districts

- Werdenberg:

capital Werdenberg, 30 electors, approx. 10,500 inhabitants

- Neu St. Johann:

capital Neu St. Johann, 30 electors, approx. 11,600 inhabitants

- Mels:

capital Mels, 25 electors, approx. 9,800 inhabitants

- Schwanden:

capital Schwanden, 29 electors, approx. 10,100 inhabitants

- Glarus:

capital Glarus, 38 electors, 12,700 inhabitants

- Schänis (Gaster):

capital Schänis, 29 electors, 11,900 inhabitants

- Rapperswil:

capital Rapperswil, 29 electors, 11,800 inhabitants

== Chronology ==
The brief tenure of office of the cantonal heads Joachim Heer (1798), Johann Jakob Heussi (1798–99), Felix Christoph Cajetan Fuchs (1799), Niklaus Heer (1799–1802), and Franz Josef Büeler (1802–03) reflected the military and political turmoil plaguing the region, which was under French occupation from 1799, during the War of the Second Coalition, with serious effects on the local economy.

The mainly-Roman Catholic canton acquired a strong aversion to the centralised nature of the government of the Helvetic Republic, even though the canton was mainly composed of territories previously subject to the Old Swiss Confederation, rather than any of the Dreizehn Orte, and even though all citizens of the republic had equal rights. The canton sided only very reluctantly with the French Revolutionary Army. Initial fervour for public education waned as the pressure from the central government was relaxed.

Upper Toggenburg was transferred to the canton of Säntis in 1801, but the canton as a whole existed until the Act of Mediation on March 10, 1803.

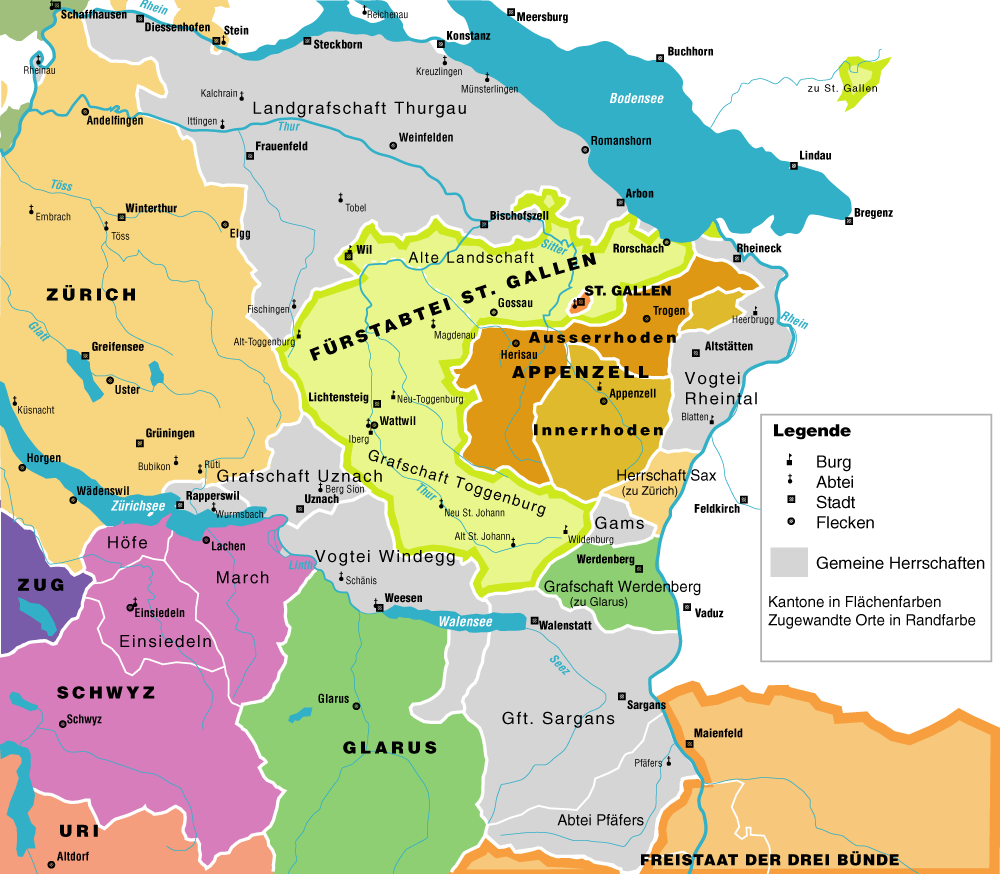
Eastern Switzerland in 1798, with shared territories in grey and associate members of the Confederacy outlined Canton of Glarus and the County of Werdenberg Canton of Schwyz Canton of Zürich and Lordship of Sax Appenzell Ausserrhoden Appenzell Innerrhoden Shared territories of the Confederacy Imperial Abbey of St. Gall Free Imperial City of St. Gallen Three Leagues
