= Campaigns of 1798 of the French Revolutionary Wars =

1798 was a relatively quiet period in the French Revolutionary Wars. The major continental powers in the First coalition had made peace with France, leaving France dominant in Europe with only a slow naval war with Great Britain to worry about. The leaders of the Directory in Paris feared Napoleon Bonaparte's popularity after his victories in Italy, so they were relieved when he proposed to depart France and mount an expedition to Egypt to gain further glory. However, Napoleon was subsequently defeated in Egypt by British forces.

== French invasion of Egypt and Syria ==
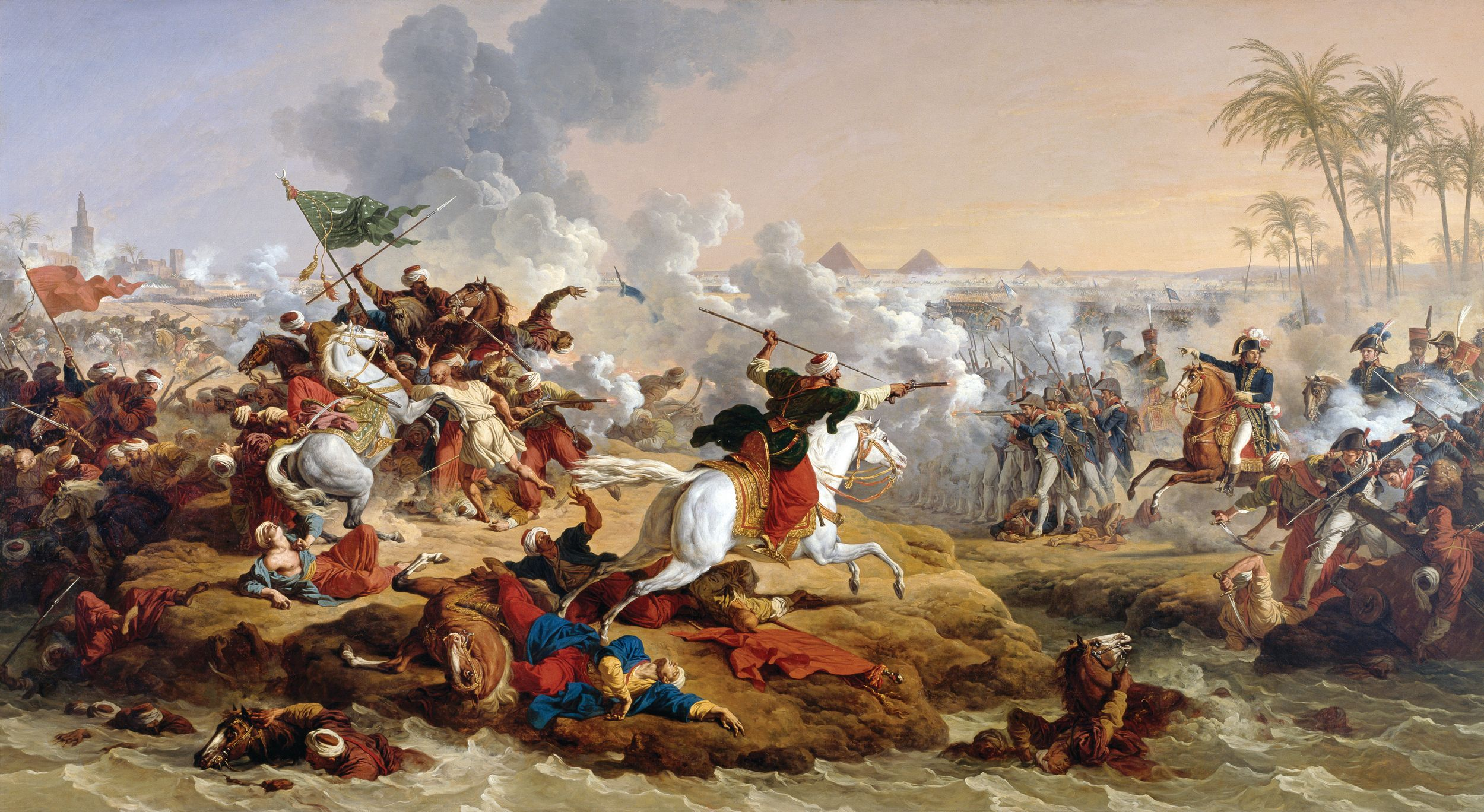
The Battle of the Pyramids

At this time, Egypt was a province of the Ottoman Empire, but Napoleon viewed invading Egypt as a way to threaten British dominance in the Mediterranean Sea and in India, as well as to gain prestige for revolutionary arms.

Napoleon raised a large army, including scientists and cultural experts, and sailed from Toulon on 19 May. Stopping to capture Malta on 12 June, he landed near Alexandria on 2 July and took the city. Napoleon's army proceeded to march against the Mameluke armies in Cairo and met them at the Battle of the Pyramids on 21 July. Facing a huge army, Napoleon organized his army into squares and used his artillery to disperse the Mameluke attacks. The Mameluke army retreated into Syria, leaving Napoleon dominant in Egypt.

=== Battle of the Nile ===
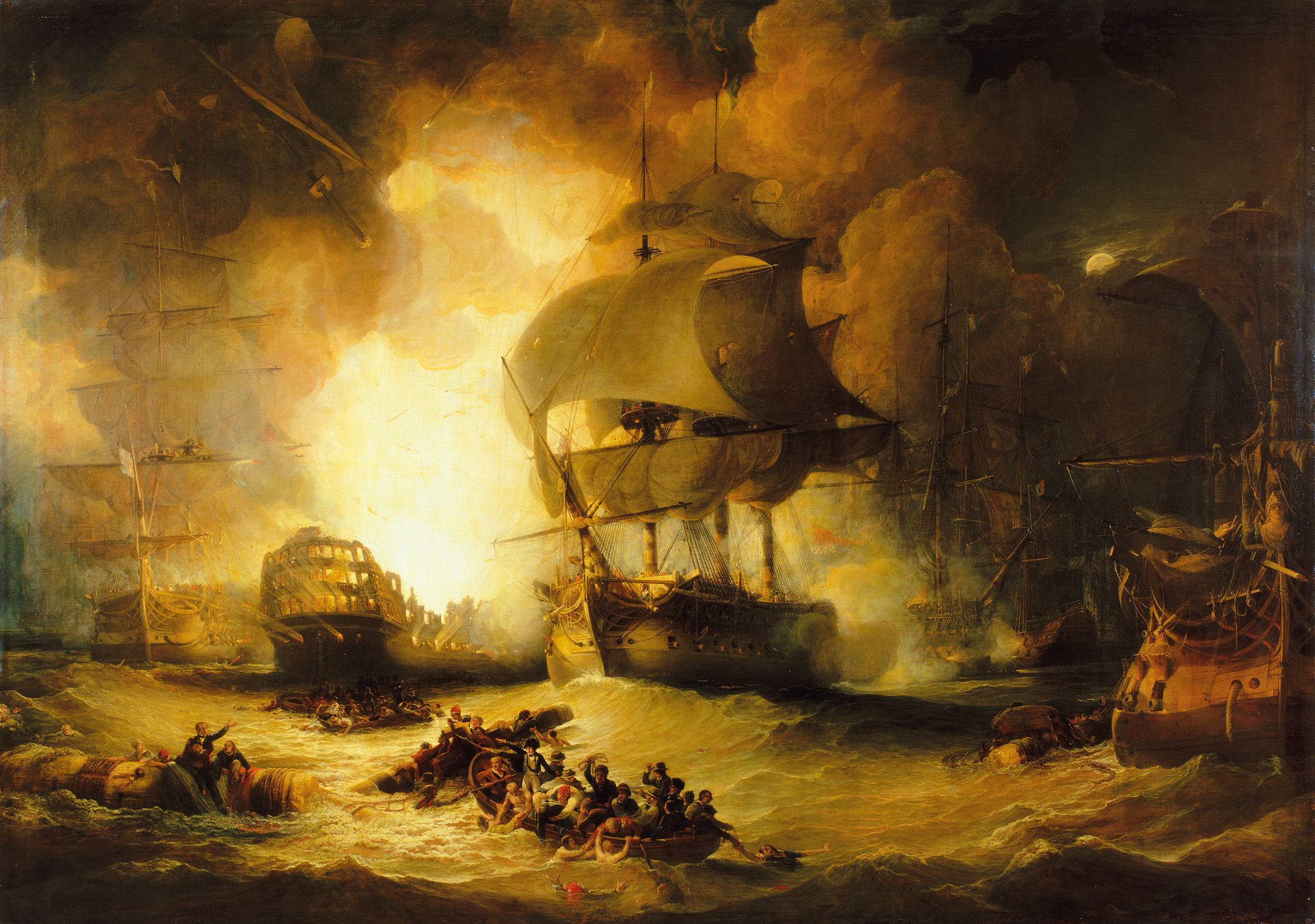
The Battle of the Nile

However, the British responded by sending Admiral Horatio Nelson to the coast of Egypt. There, he came upon the French fleet at anchor and systematically destroyed it in the Battle of the Nile (also known as the Battle of Aboukir Bay). Without a fleet, Napoleon's army was trapped in Egypt. Napoleon consolidated his base in Egypt for the remainder of the year. However, the local population in Cairo, encouraged by the French defeat at the Nile and annoyed by various taxes and impositions by the French, revolted in October, killing many of the French occupiers but eventually being suppressed. Damage to mosques sustained during this revolt embittered the Egyptian population against the French.

== Campaigns in Europe ==
The French were also under pressure in Belgium and Luxembourg where the local people revolted against conscription and anti-religious violence (Peasants' War). French troops deposed Pope Pius VI, establishing a republic in Rome.

=== Switzerland ===
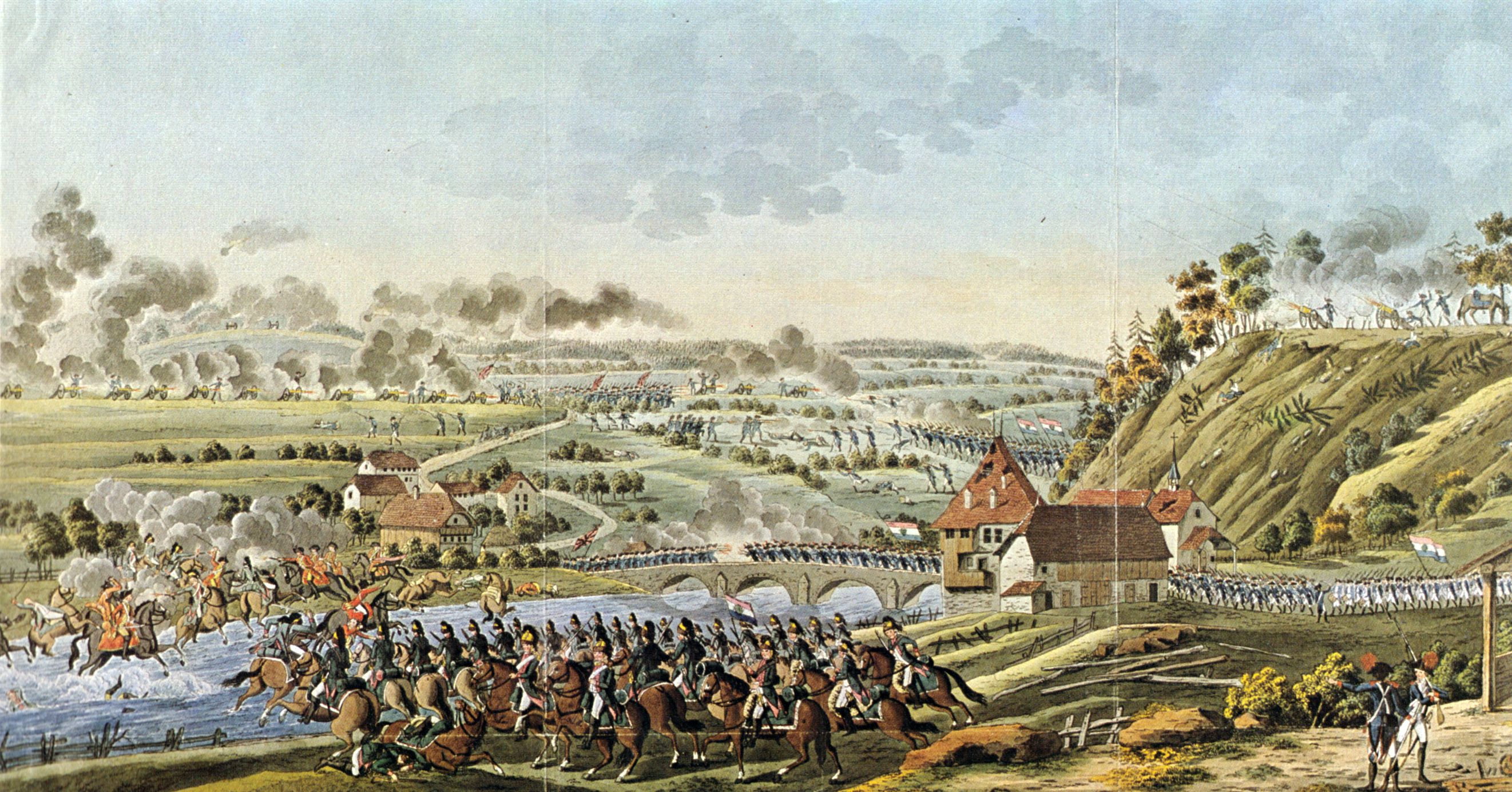
The Battle of Neuenegg

On 5 March 1798, French troops overran Switzerland at the invitation of French-speaking factions in Vaud, and the Old Swiss Confederation collapsed. On 12 April 1798, 121 cantonal deputies proclaimed the Helvetic Republic, "One and Indivisible". The new régime abolished cantonal sovereignty and feudal rights. The occupying forces established a centralized state based on the ideas of the French Revolution.

=== Ostend Raid ===
On 18 May the British launched a combined Royal Navy and British Army raid on Ostend to destroy the lock gates of the Bruge Canal and to burn the French gun-ships that were in the harbor. The objectives were achieved but the entire army contingent of 1,300 men was either killed or captured.

=== Ireland ===
An expeditionary force was sent to County Mayo in Ireland to assist in the rebellion against British rule in the summer of 1798. On 22 August, nearly two months after the main uprisings had been defeated, about 1,000 French soldiers under General Humbert landed in the north-west of the country, at Kilcummin in County Mayo. Joined by up to 5,000 United Irishmen rebels, they quickly routed defending British forces at the Battle of Castlebar and established up a short-lived "Republic of Connacht", before final defeat at the Battle of Ballinamuck, in County Longford, on 8 September 1798.

== Second Coalition ==
By the end of the year, the European powers, having recovered from their previous defeats and emboldened by Napoleon's absence, organised a new Second Coalition, beginning with an alliance Treaty between Austria and Naples. The only military activity before the end of the year was in Italy, where Naples captured Rome on 28 October but was driven out by the end of the year.

== See also ==
- French Revolution
- French Revolutionary Wars
- History of Ottoman Egypt

Preceded by 1797	French Revolutionary Wars; 1798	Succeeded by 1799
