= List of members of the Federal Assembly from the Canton of Nidwalden =

Coat of Arms

This is a list of members of both houses of the Federal Assembly from the Canton of Nidwalden. As one of the cantons defined until 1999 as "half-cantons", Nidwalden elects only one member to the Council of States

== Members of the Council of States ==
Election	Councillor (Party)
Appointed	Josef A. Maria Bünter; Conservative; 1848–1851
Appointed	Ferdinand Jann; Conservative; 1851–1855
Appointed	Karl Jann; Conservative; 1855–1857
Appointed	Jakob Kaiser; Conservative; 1857–1861
Appointed	Walter Zelger; Conservative; 1861–1868
Appointed	Jakob Kaiser; Conservative; 1868–1877
Appointed	Niklaus Lussi; Conservative; 1877–1884
Appointed	Joh. Josef M. Amstad; Conservative; 1884–1894
Appointed	Jakob Konst. Wyrsch; Conservative; 1894–1925
Appointed	Anton Zumbühl; Conservative; 1925–1937
Appointed	Remigi Joller; Conservative; 1937–1947
1939	Remigi Joller; Conservative; 1937–1947
1943	Remigi Joller; Conservative; 1937–1947
1947	Werner Christen; Independent; 1947–1967
1951	Werner Christen; Independent; 1947–1967
1955	Werner Christen; Independent; 1947–1967
1959	Werner Christen; Independent; 1947–1967
1963	Werner Christen; Independent; 1947–1967
1967	Eduard Amstad; Christian Social Conservative Party; 1967–1976
1971	Eduard Amstad; Christian Social Conservative Party; 1967–1976
1975	Eduard Amstad; Christian Social Conservative Party; 1967–1976
1977	Norbert Zumbühl; Christian Democratic People's Party; 1977–1990
1979	Norbert Zumbühl; Christian Democratic People's Party; 1977–1990
1983	Norbert Zumbühl; Christian Democratic People's Party; 1977–1990
1987	Norbert Zumbühl; Christian Democratic People's Party; 1977–1990
1990	Peter-Josef Schallberger; Christian Democratic People's Party; 1990–1999
1991	Peter-Josef Schallberger; Christian Democratic People's Party; 1990–1999
1995	Peter-Josef Schallberger; Christian Democratic People's Party; 1990–1999
1999	Marianne Slongo; Christian Democratic People's Party; 1999–2007
2003	Marianne Slongo; Christian Democratic People's Party; 1999–2007
2007	Paul Niederberger; Christian Democratic People's Party; 2007–2015
2011	Paul Niederberger; Christian Democratic People's Party; 2007–2015
2015	Hans Wicki; FDP.The Liberals; 2015–present
2019	Hans Wicki; FDP.The Liberals; 2015–present
2023	Hans Wicki; FDP.The Liberals; 2015–present

== Members of the National Council ==
Election	Councillor (Party)
1848	Melchior Jos. Wyrsch (Cons)
1851	Franz Jos. Nikl. Val. Durrer (Cons)
1854	Melchior Jos. Wyrsch (Cons)
1857	Joh. Melchior Al. Joller (Liberal)
1860	Alois (Louis) Wyrsch (Liberal)
1863	Alois (Louis) Wyrsch (Liberal)
1866	Alois (Louis) Wyrsch (Liberal)
1869	Alois (Louis) Wyrsch (Liberal)
1872	Walter Zelger (Cons)
1874	Robert Ant. Al. Durrer (Cons)
1875	Robert Ant. Al. Durrer (Cons)
1878	Robert Ant. Al. Durrer (Cons)
1881	Robert Ant. Al. Durrer (Cons)
1884	Robert Ant. Al. Durrer (Cons)
1887	Robert Ant. Al. Durrer (Cons)
1890	Hans sen. von Matt (Cons)
1893	Hans sen. von Matt (Cons)
1896	Karl Jos. Niederberger (Cons)
1899	Karl Jos. Niederberger (Cons)
1902	Karl Jos. Niederberger (Cons)
1905	Karl Jos. Niederberger (Cons)
1908	Karl Jos. Niederberger (Cons)
1911	Karl Jos. Niederberger (Cons)
1914	Karl Jos. Niederberger (Cons)
1917	Hans jun. von Matt (Cons)
1919	Hans jun. von Matt (Cons)
1922	Hans jun. von Matt (Cons)
1925	Hans jun. von Matt (Cons)
1928	Hans jun. von Matt (Cons)
1931	Hans jun. von Matt (Cons)
1932	Theodor Gabriel (Cons)
1935	Gottfried Odermatt (Cons)
1939	Gottfried Odermatt (Cons)
1943	Arnold Wagner (Cons)
1947	Arnold Wagner (Cons)
1951	Arnold Wagner (Cons)
1955	Joseph Odermatt (Cons)
1959	Joseph Odermatt (Cons)
1963	Joseph Odermatt (Cons)
1967	August Albrecht (CCS)
1971	August Albrecht (CCS)
1975	August Albrecht (CCS)
1979	Joseph Iten (CVP/PDC)
1983	Joseph Iten (CVP/PDC)
1987	Joseph Iten (CVP/PDC)
1991	Joseph Iten (CVP/PDC)
1995	Eduard Engelberger (FDP/PRD / FDP.The Liberals)
1999	Eduard Engelberger (FDP/PRD / FDP.The Liberals)
2003	Eduard Engelberger (FDP/PRD / FDP.The Liberals)
2007	Eduard Engelberger (FDP/PRD / FDP.The Liberals)
2009	Eduard Engelberger (FDP/PRD / FDP.The Liberals)
2011	Peter Keller (SVP/UDC)
2015	Peter Keller (SVP/UDC)
2019	Peter Keller (SVP/UDC)
2023	Regina Durrer-Knobel (The Centre)
