= List of members of the Federal Assembly from the Canton of Appenzell Innerrhoden =

Coat of Arms

This is a list of members of both houses of the Federal Assembly from the Canton of Appenzell Innerrhoden. As one of the cantons defined until 1999 as "half-cantons", Appenzell Innerrhoden elects only one member to the Council of States

== Members of the Council of States ==
Election	Councillor (Party)
Appointed	Josef Anton Fässler; Conservative; 1848–1850
Appointed	Johann Baptist Dähler; Conservative; 1850–1852
Appointed	Franz Joseph Heim; Conservative; 1852–1856
Appointed	Johann Baptist Dähler; Conservative; 1856–1857
Appointed	Joseph Anton Sutter; Liberal Party; 1857–1860
Appointed	Jos. Alois Broger; Conservative; 1860–1865
Appointed	Johann Baptist Kölbener; Liberal Party; 1865–1866
Appointed	Johann Anton Kölbener; Liberal Party; 1866–1869
Appointed	Johann Baptist E. Rusch; Conservative; 1869–1875
Appointed	Karl Justin Sonderegger; Liberal Party; 1875–1877
Appointed	Johann Baptist E. Rusch; Conservative; 1877–1890
Appointed	Joseph Albert U. Hautle; Conservative; 1890–1893
Appointed	Joh. Bap. Edmund Dähler; Conservative; 1893–1920
Appointed	Carl Rusch; Conservative; 1920–1937
Appointed	Armin Locher; Conservative; 1937–1963
1939	Armin Locher; Conservative; 1937–1963
1943	Armin Locher; Conservative; 1937–1963
1947	Armin Locher; Conservative; 1937–1963
1951	Armin Locher; Conservative; 1937–1963
1955	Armin Locher; Conservative; 1937–1963
1959	Armin Locher; Conservative; 1937–1963
1963	Karl Dobler; Christian Social Conservative Party; 1963–1971
1967	Karl Dobler; Christian Social Conservative Party; 1963–1971
1971	Raymond Broger; Christian Democratic People's Party; 1971–1980
1975	Raymond Broger; Christian Democratic People's Party; 1971–1980
1979	Raymond Broger; Christian Democratic People's Party; 1971–1980
1980	Carlo Schmid-Sutter; Christian Democratic People's Party; 1980–2007
1983	Carlo Schmid-Sutter; Christian Democratic People's Party; 1980–2007
1987	Carlo Schmid-Sutter; Christian Democratic People's Party; 1980–2007
1991	Carlo Schmid-Sutter; Christian Democratic People's Party; 1980–2007
1995	Carlo Schmid-Sutter; Christian Democratic People's Party; 1980–2007
1999	Carlo Schmid-Sutter; Christian Democratic People's Party; 1980–2007
2003	Carlo Schmid-Sutter; Christian Democratic People's Party; 1980–2007
2007	Ivo Bischofberger; Christian Democratic People's Party; 2007–2019
2011	Ivo Bischofberger; Christian Democratic People's Party; 2007–2019
2015	Ivo Bischofberger; Christian Democratic People's Party; 2007–2019
2019	Daniel Fässler; Christian Democratic People's Party; 2019–2023; The Centre; 2023–present
2023	Daniel Fässler; Christian Democratic People's Party; 2019–2023; The Centre; 2023–present

== Members of the National Council ==
Election	Councillor (Party)
1848	Johann Nepomuk Hautle (Conservative)
1851	Johann Nepomuk Hautle (Conservative)
1854	Johann Nepomuk Hautle (Conservative)
1857	Josef Anton Fässler (Conservative)
1860	Johann Baptist Dähler (Conservative)
1863	Johann Baptist Dähler (Conservative)
1865	Jos. Alois Broger (Conservative)
1866	Jos. Alois Broger (Conservative)
1869	Jos. Alois Broger (Conservative)
1872	Jos. Alois Broger (Conservative)
1875	Jos. Alois Broger (Conservative)
1878	Jos. Alois Broger (Conservative)
1880	Karl Justin Sonderegger (Liberal)
1881	Karl Justin Sonderegger (Liberal)
1884	Karl Justin Sonderegger (Liberal)
1887	Karl Justin Sonderegger (Liberal)
1890	Joh. Bap. Edmund Dähler (Conservative)
1893	Karl Justin Sonderegger (Liberal)
1896	Karl Justin Sonderegger (Liberal)
1899	Karl Justin Sonderegger (Liberal)
1902	Karl Justin Sonderegger (Liberal)
1905	Karl Justin Sonderegger (Liberal)
1906	Adolf Steuble (Conservative)
1908	Adolf Steuble (Conservative)
1911	Adolf Steuble (Conservative)
1914	Adolf Steuble (Conservative)
1917	Adolf Steuble (Conservative)
1919	Adolf Steuble (Conservative)
1922	Adolf Steuble (Conservative)
1925	Adolf Steuble (Conservative)
1926	Edmund Dähler (Conservative)
1928	Edmund Dähler (Conservative)
1931	Edmund Dähler (Conservative)
1935	Johann Baptist Albert Broger (Conservative)
1939	Johann Baptist Albert Broger (Conservative)
1943	Johann Baptist Albert Broger (Conservative)
1947	Johann Baptist Albert Broger (Conservative)
1951	Johann Baptist Albert Broger (Conservative)
1955	Johann Baptist Albert Broger (Conservative)
1959	Johann Baptist Albert Broger (Conservative)
1963	Johann Baptist Albert Broger (Conservative)
1964	Raymond Broger (CCS)
1967	Raymond Broger (CCS)
1971	Arnold Koller (CVP/PDC)
1975	Arnold Koller (CVP/PDC)
1979	Arnold Koller (CVP/PDC)
1983	Arnold Koller (CVP/PDC)
1987	Rolf Engler (CVP/PDC)
1991	Rolf Engler (CVP/PDC)
1995	Rolf Engler (CVP/PDC)
1999	Arthur Loepfe (CVP/PDC)
2003	Arthur Loepfe (CVP/PDC)
2007	Arthur Loepfe (CVP/PDC)
2011	Daniel Fässler (CVP/PDC)
2015	Daniel Fässler (CVP/PDC)
2019	Thomas Rechsteiner (CVP/PDC / The Centre)
2023	Thomas Rechsteiner (CVP/PDC / The Centre)
