= List of members of the Federal Assembly from the Canton of Valais =

Coat of Arms

This is a list of members of both houses of the Swiss Federal Assembly from the Canton of Valais.

== Members of the Council of States ==
Councillor (Party)	Election	Councillor (Party)
Jos.-Henry Ducrey; Free Democratic Party; 1848–1850	Appointed	Jos.-Hyacinthe Grillet; Free Democratic Party; 1848–1850
Charles-Louis de Rivaz; Free Democratic Party; 1850–1852	Appointed	Joseph Rion; Free Democratic Party; 1850–1853
Alphonse Morand; Free Democratic Party; 1852–1854	Appointed	Joseph Rion; Free Democratic Party; 1850–1853
Alphonse Morand; Free Democratic Party; 1852–1854	Appointed	Elias de Courten; Conservative; 1853–1855
Maurice-Eugène Filliez; Free Democratic Party; 1854–1855	Appointed	Elias de Courten; Conservative; 1853–1855
Maurice Claivaz; Free Democratic Party; 1855–1856	Appointed	Joseph Rion; Free Democratic Party; 1855–1856
Joseph Anton Clemenz; Conservative; 1856–1857	Appointed	Hippolyte Pignat; Free Democratic Party; 1856–1857
Leo Luzian von Roten; Conservative; 1857–1859	Appointed	Antoine-Joseph Amacker; 0; 1857–1859
Ignaz Zenruffinen; Conservative; 1859–1861	Appointed	Joseph Zermatten; Conservative; 1859–1861
Maurice Chappelet; Liberal Party; 1861–1863	Appointed	Joseph Anton Clemenz; Conservative; 1861–1863
Maurice Evéquoz; Conservative; 1863–1865	Appointed	Hans Anton von Roten; Conservative; 1863–1865
Joseph Chappex; Conservative; 1865–1868	Appointed	Joseph Anton Clemenz; Conservative; 1865–1868
Camille de Werra; Conservative; 1868–1868	Appointed	Peter Ludwig In Albon; Conservative; 1868–1871
Fidèle-Eman. Joris; Conservative; 1868–1869	Appointed	Peter Ludwig In Albon; Conservative; 1868–1871
Cyprien Barlatey; Conservative; 1869–1871	Appointed	Peter Ludwig In Albon; Conservative; 1868–1871
Felix-Ignaz Clausen; Conservative; 1871–1873	Appointed	Joseph Rion; Free Democratic Party; 1871–1873
Ferdinand de Montheys; Conservative; 1873–1875	Appointed	Jean-Baptist Graven; Conservative; 1873–1876
Maurice Evéquoz; Conservative; 1875–1878	Appointed	Jean-Baptist Graven; Conservative; 1873–1876
Maurice Evéquoz; Conservative; 1875–1878	Appointed	Ignaz Zenruffinen; Conservative; 1876–1880
Felix-Ignaz Clausen; Conservative; 1878–1885	Appointed	Ignaz Zenruffinen; Conservative; 1876–1880
Felix-Ignaz Clausen; Conservative; 1878–1885	Appointed	Joseph Chappex; Conservative; 1880–1888
Gustav Loretan; Conservative; 1885–1895	Appointed	Joseph Chappex; Conservative; 1880–1888
Gustav Loretan; Conservative; 1885–1895	Appointed	Henri-Ch.-Jos. Torrenté; Conservative; 1888–1896
Louis de Kalbermatten; Conservative; 1895–1898	Appointed	Henri-Ch.-Jos. Torrenté; Conservative; 1888–1896
Louis de Kalbermatten; Conservative; 1895–1898	Appointed	Georges de Stockalper; Conservative; 1896–1898
Achille Chappaz; Conservative; 1898–1902	Appointed	Charles de Preux; Conservative; 1898–1901
Achille Chappaz; Conservative; 1898–1902	Appointed	Jean-Marie de Chastonay; Conservative; 1901–1906
Henri-Ch.-Jos. Torrenté; Conservative; 1902–1903	Appointed	Jean-Marie de Chastonay; Conservative; 1901–1906
Laurent Rey; Conservative; 1903–1906	Appointed	Jean-Marie de Chastonay; Conservative; 1901–1906
Joseph Ribordy; Conservative; 1906–1923	Appointed	Heinrich von Roten; Conservative; 1906–1916
Joseph Ribordy; Conservative; 1906–1923	Appointed	Julius Zenruffinen; Conservative; 1917–1920
Joseph Ribordy; Conservative; 1906–1923	Appointed	Raimund Loretan; Conservative; 1920–1928
Pierre Barman; Conservative; 1923–1943	Appointed	Raimund Loretan; Conservative; 1920–1928
Pierre Barman; Conservative; 1923–1943	Appointed	Raymond Evéquoz; Conservative; 1928–1943
Victor Petrig; Conservative; 1943–1947	Appointed	Maurice Troillet; Conservative; 1943–1955
Alfred Clausen; Conservative; 1947–1955	Appointed	Maurice Troillet; Conservative; 1943–1955
Marius Lampert; Conservative; 1955–1975	Appointed	
Marius Lampert; Conservative; 1955–1975	Appointed	Joseph Moulin; Conservative; 1956–1959
Marius Lampert; Conservative; 1955–1975	1959	Leo Guntern; Christian Social Conservative Party; 1959–1967
Marius Lampert; Conservative; 1955–1975	1963	Leo Guntern; Christian Social Conservative Party; 1959–1967
Marius Lampert; Conservative; 1955–1975	1967	Hermann Bodenmann; Christian Social Conservative Party; 1967–1975
Marius Lampert; Conservative; 1955–1975	1971	Hermann Bodenmann; Christian Social Conservative Party; 1967–1975
Guy Genoud; Christian Democratic People's Party; 1975–1987	1975	Odilo Guntern; Christian Democratic People's Party; 1975–1983
Guy Genoud; Christian Democratic People's Party; 1975–1987	1979	Odilo Guntern; Christian Democratic People's Party; 1975–1983
Guy Genoud; Christian Democratic People's Party; 1975–1987	1983	Daniel Lauber; Christian Democratic People's Party; 1983–1991
Edouard Delalay; Christian Democratic People's Party; 1987–1999	1987	Daniel Lauber; Christian Democratic People's Party; 1983–1991
Edouard Delalay; Christian Democratic People's Party; 1987–1999	1991	Peter Bloetzer; Christian Democratic People's Party; 1991–1999
Edouard Delalay; Christian Democratic People's Party; 1987–1999	1995	Peter Bloetzer; Christian Democratic People's Party; 1991–1999
Simon Epiney; Christian Democratic People's Party; 1999–2007	1999	Rolf Escher; Christian Democratic People's Party; 1999–2007
Simon Epiney; Christian Democratic People's Party; 1999–2007	2003	Rolf Escher; Christian Democratic People's Party; 1999–2007
Jean-René Fournier; Christian Democratic People's Party; 2007–2019	2007	René Imoberdorf; Christian Social People's Party of Upper Valais; 2007–2015
Jean-René Fournier; Christian Democratic People's Party; 2007–2019	2011	René Imoberdorf; Christian Social People's Party of Upper Valais; 2007–2015
Jean-René Fournier; Christian Democratic People's Party; 2007–2019	2015	Beat Rieder; Christian Democratic People's Party; 2015–2023; The Centre; 2023–present
Marianne Maret; Christian Democratic People's Party; 2019–2023; The Centre; 2023–present	2019	Beat Rieder; Christian Democratic People's Party; 2015–2023; The Centre; 2023–present
Marianne Maret; Christian Democratic People's Party; 2019–2023; The Centre; 2023–present	2023	Beat Rieder; Christian Democratic People's Party; 2015–2023; The Centre; 2023–present

== Members of the National Council ==
Election	Councillor (Party)	Councillor (Party)	Councillor (Party)	Councillor (Party)	Councillor (Party)	Councillor (Party)	Councillor (Party)	Councillor (Party)
1848	Maurice Barman (FDP/PRD)	Joseph Anton Clemenz (Conservative)	Antoine de Riedmatten (Conservative)	Adrien-Félix Pottier (FDP/PRD)	4 seats 1848–1863			
1851	Maurice Barman (FDP/PRD)	Alexis Allet (Conservative)	Antoine de Riedmatten (Conservative)	Adrien-Félix Pottier (FDP/PRD)	4 seats 1848–1863			
1854	Maurice Barman (FDP/PRD)	Alexis Allet (Conservative)	Antoine de Riedmatten (Conservative)	Adrien-Félix Pottier (FDP/PRD)	4 seats 1848–1863			
1856	Maurice Barman (FDP/PRD)	Alexis Allet (Conservative)	Antoine de Riedmatten (Conservative)	Maurice-Eugène Filliez (FDP/PRD)	4 seats 1848–1863			
1857	Adrien de Courten (Conservative)	Alexis Allet (Conservative)	L.-Jos.-Antoine Luder (Conservative)	Maurice Claivaz (FDP/PRD)	4 seats 1848–1863			
1858	Adrien de Courten (Conservative)	Alexis Allet (Conservative)	L.-Jos.-Antoine Luder (Conservative)	Camille de Werra (Conservative)	4 seats 1848–1863			
1860	Adrien de Courten (Conservative)	Alexis Allet (Conservative)	Louis-G. Barman (FDP/PRD)	Joseph Torrent (FDP/PRD)	4 seats 1848–1863			
1863	Adrien de Courten (Conservative)	Alexis Allet (Conservative)	Louis-G. Barman (FDP/PRD)	Maurice-Antoine Cretton (FDP/PRD)	Charles de Rivaz (Conservative)	5 seats 1863–1902		
1866	Maurice Evéquoz (Conservative)	Alexis Allet (Conservative)	Louis-G. Barman (FDP/PRD)	Maurice-Antoine Cretton (FDP/PRD)	Hans Anton von Roten (Conservative)	5 seats 1863–1902		
1869	Maurice Evéquoz (Conservative)	Alexis Allet (Conservative)	Louis-G. Barman (FDP/PRD)	Maurice-Antoine Cretton (FDP/PRD)	Hans Anton von Roten (Conservative)	5 seats 1863–1902		
1872	Maurice Evéquoz (Conservative)	Alexis Allet (Conservative)	Louis-G. Barman (FDP/PRD)	Alexandre Dénériaz (FDP/PRD)	Hans Anton von Roten (Conservative)	5 seats 1863–1902		
1872	Maurice Evéquoz (Conservative)	Louis Gross (Conservative)	Louis-G. Barman (FDP/PRD)	Ignaz Zenruffinen (Conservative)	Hans Anton von Roten (Conservative)	5 seats 1863–1902		
1875	Victor de Chastonay (Conservative)	Ferdinand de Montheys (Conservative)	Louis-G. Barman (FDP/PRD)	Alexandre Dénériaz (FDP/PRD)	Hans Anton von Roten (Conservative)	5 seats 1863–1902		
1878	Victor de Chastonay (Conservative)	Ferdinand de Montheys (Conservative)	Charles de Werra (Conservative)	Fidèle-Eman. Joris (Conservative)	Hans Anton von Roten (Conservative)	5 seats 1863–1902		
1881	Victor de Chastonay (Conservative)	Maurice Evéquoz (Conservative)	Charles de Werra (Conservative)	Fidèle-Eman. Joris (Conservative)	Hans Anton von Roten (Conservative)	5 seats 1863–1902		
1884	Victor de Chastonay (Conservative)	Maurice Evéquoz (Conservative)	Charles de Werra (Conservative)	Fidèle-Eman. Joris (Conservative)	Hans Anton von Roten (Conservative)	5 seats 1863–1902		
1887	Victor de Chastonay (Conservative)	Maurice Chappelet (Liberal)	Joseph-A. Favre (Conservative)	Emile Gaillard (FDP/PRD)	Hans Anton von Roten (Conservative)	5 seats 1863–1902		
1890	Victor de Chastonay (Conservative)	Charles de Werra (Conservative)	Joseph Kuntschen (Conservative)	Emile Gaillard (FDP/PRD)	Hans Anton von Roten (Conservative)	5 seats 1863–1902		
1892	Alfred Perrig (Conservative)	Charles de Werra (Conservative)	Joseph Kuntschen (Conservative)	Emile Gaillard (FDP/PRD)	Hans Anton von Roten (Conservative)	5 seats 1863–1902		
1893	Alfred Perrig (Conservative)	Charles de Werra (Conservative)	Joseph Kuntschen (Conservative)	Emile Gaillard (FDP/PRD)	Hans Anton von Roten (Conservative)	5 seats 1863–1902		
1895	Alfred Perrig (Conservative)	Henri Bioley (Conservative)	Joseph Kuntschen (Conservative)	Emile Gaillard (FDP/PRD)	Gustav Loretan (Conservative)	5 seats 1863–1902		
1896	Alfred Perrig (Conservative)	Henri Bioley (Conservative)	Joseph Kuntschen (Conservative)	Camille Défayes (FDP/PRD)	Gustav Loretan (Conservative)	5 seats 1863–1902		
1899	Alfred Perrig (Conservative)	Henri Bioley (Conservative)	Joseph Kuntschen (Conservative)	Camille Défayes (FDP/PRD)	Gustav Loretan (Conservative)	5 seats 1863–1902		
1902	Alfred Perrig (Conservative)	Henri Bioley (Conservative)	Joseph Kuntschen (Conservative)	Camille Défayes (FDP/PRD)	Gustav Loretan (Conservative)	Raymond Evéquoz (Conservative)	6 seats 1902–1943	
1904	Heinrich von Roten (Conservative)	Henri Bioley (Conservative)	Joseph Kuntschen (Conservative)	Camille Défayes (FDP/PRD)	Gustav Loretan (Conservative)	Raymond Evéquoz (Conservative)	6 seats 1902–1943	
1905	Maurice F. Pellissier (Conservative)	Alexander Seiler (Conservative)	Joseph Kuntschen (Conservative)	Camille Défayes (FDP/PRD)	Gustav Loretan (Conservative)	Raymond Evéquoz (Conservative)	6 seats 1902–1943	
1908	Maurice F. Pellissier (Conservative)	Alexander Seiler (Conservative)	Joseph Kuntschen (Conservative)	Eugène de Lavallaz (FDP/PRD)	Charles de Preux (Conservative)	Raymond Evéquoz (Conservative)	6 seats 1902–1943	
1911	Jules G.-A. Tissières (Conservative)	Alexander Seiler (Conservative)	Joseph Kuntschen (Conservative)	Eugène de Lavallaz (FDP/PRD)	Charles de Preux (Conservative)	Raymond Evéquoz (Conservative)	6 seats 1902–1943	
1914	Jules G.-A. Tissières (Conservative)	Alexander Seiler (Conservative)	Joseph Kuntschen (Conservative)	Eugène de Lavallaz (FDP/PRD)	Charles de Preux (Conservative)	Raymond Evéquoz (Conservative)	6 seats 1902–1943	
1917	Jules G.-A. Tissières (Conservative)	Alexander Seiler (Conservative)	Joseph Kuntschen (Conservative)	Eugène de Lavallaz (FDP/PRD)	Victor Petrig (Conservative)	Raymond Evéquoz (Conservative)	6 seats 1902–1943	
1918	Maurice F. Pellissier (Conservative)	Alexander Seiler (Conservative)	Joseph Kuntschen (Conservative)	Eugène de Lavallaz (FDP/PRD)	Victor Petrig (Conservative)	Raymond Evéquoz (Conservative)	6 seats 1902–1943	
1919	Maurice F. Pellissier (Conservative)	Alexander Seiler (Conservative)	Joseph Kuntschen (Conservative)	Camille Défayes (FDP/PRD)	Victor Petrig (Conservative)	Raymond Evéquoz (Conservative)	6 seats 1902–1943	
1920	Maurice F. Pellissier (Conservative)	Hermann Seiler (Conservative)	Joseph Kuntschen (Conservative)	Jules-Jean Couchepin (FDP/PRD)	Victor Petrig (Conservative)	Raymond Evéquoz (Conservative)	6 seats 1902–1943	
1921	Cyrille Pitteloud (Conservative)	Hermann Seiler (Conservative)	Maurice Troillet (Conservative)	Jules-Jean Couchepin (FDP/PRD)	Victor Petrig (Conservative)	Raymond Evéquoz (Conservative)	6 seats 1902–1943	
1922	Cyrille Pitteloud (Conservative)	Hermann Seiler (Conservative)	Maurice Troillet (Conservative)	Jules-Jean Couchepin (FDP/PRD)	Victor Petrig (Conservative)	Raymond Evéquoz (Conservative)	6 seats 1902–1943	
1925	Cyrille Pitteloud (Conservative)	Josef Escher (Conservative)	Henri Spahr (FDP/PRD)	Jules-Jean Couchepin (FDP/PRD)	Victor Petrig (Conservative)	Raymond Evéquoz (Conservative)	6 seats 1902–1943	
1928	André Germanier (Conservative)	Josef Escher (Conservative)	Camille Crittin (FDP/PRD)	Joseph Kuntschen (Conservative)	Victor Petrig (Conservative)	Maurice Troillet (Conservative)	6 seats 1902–1943	
1931	André Germanier (Conservative)	Josef Escher (Conservative)	Camille Crittin (FDP/PRD)	Joseph Kuntschen (Conservative)	Victor Petrig (Conservative)	Maurice Troillet (Conservative)	6 seats 1902–1943	
1932	André Germanier (Conservative)	Rudolf Metry (Conservative)	Camille Crittin (FDP/PRD)	Joseph Kuntschen (Conservative)	Victor Petrig (Conservative)	Maurice Troillet (Conservative)	6 seats 1902–1943	
1935	André Germanier (Conservative)	Rudolf Metry (Conservative)	Camille Crittin (FDP/PRD)	Karl Dellberg (SP/PS)	Victor Petrig (Conservative)	Maurice Troillet (Conservative)	6 seats 1902–1943	
1936	André Germanier (Conservative)	Josef Escher (Conservative)	Camille Crittin (FDP/PRD)	Karl Dellberg (SP/PS)	Victor Petrig (Conservative)	Maurice Troillet (Conservative)	6 seats 1902–1943	
1937	Joseph Kuntschen (Conservative)	Josef Escher (Conservative)	Camille Crittin (FDP/PRD)	Karl Dellberg (SP/PS)	Victor Petrig (Conservative)	Maurice Troillet (Conservative)	6 seats 1902–1943	
1939	Joseph Kuntschen (Conservative)	Josef Escher (Conservative)	Camille Crittin (FDP/PRD)	Karl Dellberg (SP/PS)	Victor Petrig (Conservative)	Maurice Troillet (Conservative)	6 seats 1902–1943	
1943	Joseph Kuntschen (Conservative)	Josef Escher (Conservative)	Camille Crittin (FDP/PRD)	Karl Dellberg (SP/PS)	Henri Carron (Conservative)	Antoine Favre (Conservative)	Oskar Schnyder (Conservative)	7 seats 1943–2015
1947	Paul de Courten (Conservative)	Josef Escher (Conservative)	Camille Crittin (FDP/PRD)	Francis Germanier (FDP/PRD)	Joseph Moulin (Conservative)	Antoine Favre (Conservative)	Oskar Schnyder (Conservative)	7 seats 1943–2015
1948	Paul de Courten (Conservative)	Josef Escher (Conservative)	Camille Crittin (FDP/PRD)	Francis Germanier (FDP/PRD)	Joseph Moulin (Conservative)	Antoine Favre (Conservative)	Peter von Roten (Conservative)	7 seats 1943–2015
1950	Paul de Courten (Conservative)	Meinrad Michlig (Conservative)	Camille Crittin (FDP/PRD)	Francis Germanier (FDP/PRD)	Joseph Moulin (Conservative)	Antoine Favre (Conservative)	Peter von Roten (Conservative)	7 seats 1943–2015
1951	Paul de Courten (Conservative)	Moritz Kämpfen (Conservative)	Camille Crittin (FDP/PRD)	Karl Dellberg (SP/PS)	Joseph Moulin (Conservative)	Antoine Favre (Conservative)	Peter von Roten (Conservative)	7 seats 1943–2015
1952	Paul de Courten (Conservative)	Moritz Kämpfen (Conservative)	Camille Crittin (FDP/PRD)	Karl Dellberg (SP/PS)	Joseph Moulin (Conservative)	René Jacquod (Conservative)	Leo Stoffel (Conservative)	7 seats 1943–2015
1955	Roger Bonvin (Conservative)	Moritz Kämpfen (Conservative)	Francis Germanier (FDP/PRD)	Karl Dellberg (SP/PS)	Joseph Moulin (Conservative)	René Jacquod (Conservative)	Leo Stoffel (Conservative)	7 seats 1943–2015
1956	Roger Bonvin (Conservative)	Moritz Kämpfen (Conservative)	Francis Germanier (FDP/PRD)	Karl Dellberg (SP/PS)	Paul de Courten (Conservative)	René Jacquod (Conservative)	Leo Stoffel (Conservative)	7 seats 1943–2015
1959	Roger Bonvin (Conservative)	Moritz Kämpfen (Conservative)	Francis Germanier (FDP/PRD)	Karl Dellberg (SP/PS)	Paul de Courten (Conservative)	René Jacquod (Conservative)	Leo Stoffel (Conservative)	7 seats 1943–2015
1962	Félix Carruzzo (CCS)	Moritz Kämpfen (Conservative)	Francis Germanier (FDP/PRD)	Karl Dellberg (SP/PS)	Paul de Courten (Conservative)	René Jacquod (Conservative)	Leo Stoffel (Conservative)	7 seats 1943–2015
1963	Félix Carruzzo (CCS)	Moritz Kämpfen (Conservative)	Francis Germanier (FDP/PRD)	Karl Dellberg (SP/PS)	Adolphe Traveletti (CCS)	René Jacquod (Conservative)	Leo Stoffel (Conservative)	7 seats 1943–2015
1966	Félix Carruzzo (CCS)	Moritz Kämpfen (Conservative)	Francis Germanier (FDP/PRD)	Karl Dellberg (SP/PS)	Paul de Courten (CCS)	René Jacquod (Conservative)	Leo Stoffel (Conservative)	7 seats 1943–2015
1967	Félix Carruzzo (CCS)	Armand Bochatay (CCS)	Aloys Copt (FDP/PRD)	Karl Dellberg (SP/PS)	Innozenz Lehner (CCS)	Rodolphe Tissières (CCS)	Hans Wyer (CCS)	7 seats 1943–2015
1971	Félix Carruzzo (CCS)	Armand Bochatay (CCS)	Aloys Copt (FDP/PRD)	Gabrielle Nanchen (SP/PS)	Innozenz Lehner (CCS)	Rodolphe Tissières (CCS)	Hans Wyer (CCS)	7 seats 1943–2015
1975	Félix Carruzzo (CCS)	Armand Bochatay (CCS)	Bernard Dupont (FDP/PRD)	Gabrielle Nanchen (SP/PS)	Paul Biderbost (CVP/PDC)	Pierre de Chastonay (CVP/PDC)	Hans Wyer (CCS)	7 seats 1943–2015
1977	Félix Carruzzo (CCS)	Armand Bochatay (CCS)	Bernard Dupont (FDP/PRD)	Gabrielle Nanchen (SP/PS)	Paul Biderbost (CVP/PDC)	Pierre de Chastonay (CVP/PDC)	Herbert Dirren (CVP/PDC)	7 seats 1943–2015
1979	Pascal Couchepin (FDP/PRD)	Vital Darbellay (CVP/PDC)	Bernard Dupont (FDP/PRD)	Françoise Vannay (SP/PS)	Paul Biderbost (CVP/PDC)	Pierre de Chastonay (CVP/PDC)	Herbert Dirren (CVP/PDC)	7 seats 1943–2015
1983	Pascal Couchepin (FDP/PRD)	Vital Darbellay (CVP/PDC)	Bernard Dupont (FDP/PRD)	Françoise Vannay (SP/PS)	Paul Schmidhalter (CVP/PDC)	Pierre de Chastonay (CVP/PDC)	Herbert Dirren (CVP/PDC)	7 seats 1943–2015
1987	Pascal Couchepin (FDP/PRD)	Vital Darbellay (CVP/PDC)	Hubert Bonvin (FDP/PRD)	Peter Bodenmann (SP/PS)	Paul Schmidhalter (CVP/PDC)	Franz-Joseph Hildbrand (CVP/PDC)	Monique Paccolat (CVP/PDC)	7 seats 1943–2015
1989	Pascal Couchepin (FDP/PRD)	Vital Darbellay (CVP/PDC)	Rosemarie Antille (FDP/PRD)	Peter Bodenmann (SP/PS)	Paul Schmidhalter (CVP/PDC)	Franz-Joseph Hildbrand (CVP/PDC)	Monique Paccolat (CVP/PDC)	7 seats 1943–2015
1991	Pascal Couchepin (FDP/PRD)	Vital Darbellay (CVP/PDC)	Bernard Comby (FDP/PRD)	Peter Bodenmann (SP/PS)	Paul Schmidhalter (CVP/PDC)	Franz-Joseph Hildbrand (CVP/PDC)	Simon Epiney (CVP/PDC)	7 seats 1943–2015
1995	Pascal Couchepin (FDP/PRD)	Jean-Jérôme Filliez (CVP/PDC)	Bernard Comby (FDP/PRD)	Peter Bodenmann (SP/PS)	Otto G. Loretan (CVP/PDC)	Odilo Schmid (CVP/PDC)	Simon Epiney (CVP/PDC)	7 seats 1943–2015
1997	Pascal Couchepin (FDP/PRD)	Jean-Jérôme Filliez (CVP/PDC)	Bernard Comby (FDP/PRD)	Thomas Burgener (SP/PS)	Otto G. Loretan (CVP/PDC)	Odilo Schmid (CVP/PDC)	Simon Epiney (CVP/PDC)	7 seats 1943–2015
1998	Charles-Albert Antille (FDP/PRD)	Gilbert Debons (CVP/PDC)	Bernard Comby (FDP/PRD)	Thomas Burgener (SP/PS)	Otto G. Loretan (CVP/PDC)	Odilo Schmid (CVP/PDC)	Simon Epiney (CVP/PDC)	7 seats 1943–2015
1999	Charles-Albert Antille (FDP/PRD)	Gilbert Debons (CVP/PDC)	Bernard Comby (FDP/PRD)	Thomas Burgener (SP/PS)	Ruth Kalbermatten (CVP/PDC)	Odilo Schmid (CVP/PDC)	Simon Epiney (CVP/PDC)	7 seats 1943–2015
1999	Charles-Albert Antille (FDP/PRD)	Maurice Chevrier (CVP/PDC)	Stéphane Rossini (SP/PS)	Peter Jossen-Zinsstag (SP/PS)	Fernand Mariétan (CVP/PDC)	Odilo Schmid (CVP/PDC)	Jean-Michel Cina (CVP/PDC)	7 seats 1943–2015
2003	Jean-René Germanier (FDP/PRD / FDP.The Liberals)	Maurice Chevrier (CVP/PDC)	Stéphane Rossini (SP/PS)	Jean-Noël Rey (SP/PS)	Christophe Darbellay (CVP/PDC)	Oskar Freysinger (SVP/UDC)	Jean-Michel Cina (CVP/PDC)	7 seats 1943–2015
2005	Jean-René Germanier (FDP/PRD / FDP.The Liberals)	Maurice Chevrier (CVP/PDC)	Stéphane Rossini (SP/PS)	Jean-Noël Rey (SP/PS)	Christophe Darbellay (CVP/PDC)	Oskar Freysinger (SVP/UDC)	Viola Amherd (CVP/PDC)	7 seats 1943–2015
2007	Jean-René Germanier (FDP/PRD / FDP.The Liberals)	Maurice Chevrier (CVP/PDC)	Stéphane Rossini (SP/PS)	Roberto Schmidt (CVP/PDC)	Christophe Darbellay (CVP/PDC)	Oskar Freysinger (SVP/UDC)	Viola Amherd (CVP/PDC)	7 seats 1943–2015
2010	Jean-René Germanier (FDP/PRD / FDP.The Liberals)	Paul-André Roux (CVP/PDC)	Stéphane Rossini (SP/PS)	Roberto Schmidt (CVP/PDC)	Christophe Darbellay (CVP/PDC)	Oskar Freysinger (SVP/UDC)	Viola Amherd (CVP/PDC)	7 seats 1943–2015
2011	Jean-René Germanier (FDP/PRD / FDP.The Liberals)	Yannick Buttet (CVP/PDC)	Stéphane Rossini (SP/PS)	Mathias Reynard (SP/PS)	Christophe Darbellay (CVP/PDC)	Oskar Freysinger (SVP/UDC)	Viola Amherd (CVP/PDC)	7 seats 1943–2015
2015	Philippe Nantermod (FDP/PLR)	Yannick Buttet (CVP/PDC)	Franz Ruppen (SVP/UDC)	Mathias Reynard (SP/PS)	Géraldine Marchand-Balet (CVP/PDC)	Jean-Luc Addor (SVP/UDC)	Viola Amherd (CVP/PDC)	Roberto Schmidt (CVP/PDC)
2017	Philippe Nantermod (FDP/PLR)	Yannick Buttet (CVP/PDC)	Franz Ruppen (SVP/UDC)	Mathias Reynard (SP/PS)	Géraldine Marchand-Balet (CVP/PDC)	Jean-Luc Addor (SVP/UDC)	Viola Amherd (CVP/PDC)	Thomas Egger (CSPO)
2018	Philippe Nantermod (FDP/PLR)	Benjamin Roduit (CVP/PDC / The Centre)	Franz Ruppen (SVP/UDC)	Mathias Reynard (SP/PS)	Géraldine Marchand-Balet (CVP/PDC)	Jean-Luc Addor (SVP/UDC)	Viola Amherd (CVP/PDC)	Thomas Egger (CSPO)
2019	Philippe Nantermod (FDP/PLR)	Benjamin Roduit (CVP/PDC / The Centre)	Franz Ruppen (SVP/UDC)	Mathias Reynard (SP/PS)	Sidney Kamerzin (CVP/PDC / The Centre)	Jean-Luc Addor (SVP/UDC)	Philipp Matthias Bregy (CVP/PDC / The Centre)	Christophe Clivaz (GP/PV)
2023	Philippe Nantermod (FDP/PLR)	Benjamin Roduit (CVP/PDC / The Centre)	Michael Graber (SVP/UDC)	Emmanuel Amoos (SP/PS)	Sidney Kamerzin (CVP/PDC / The Centre)	Jean-Luc Addor (SVP/UDC)	Philipp Matthias Bregy (CVP/PDC / The Centre)	Christophe Clivaz (GP/PV)
