= List of members of the Federal Assembly from the Canton of Uri =

Coat of Arms

This is a list of members of both houses of the Federal Assembly from the Canton of Uri.

== Members of the Council of States ==
Councillor (Party)	Election	Councillor (Party)
Josef Fidel Christen; Conservative; 1848–1861	Appointed	Jost Muheim; Conservative; 1848–1850
Josef Fidel Christen; Conservative; 1848–1861	Appointed	Josef Arnold; Conservative; 1850–1865
Karl Emanuel Müller; Conservative; 1861–1863	Appointed	Josef Arnold; Conservative; 1850–1865
Jost Muheim; Conservative; 1863–1866	Appointed	Josef Arnold; Conservative; 1850–1865
Jost Muheim; Conservative; 1863–1866	Appointed	Franz Lusser; Conservative; 1865–1882
Karl Muheim; Conservative; 1866–1867	Appointed	Franz Lusser; Conservative; 1865–1882
Josef Huber; Conservative; 1868–1877	Appointed	Franz Lusser; Conservative; 1865–1882
Gustav Muheim; Conservative; 1877–1901	Appointed	Franz Lusser; Conservative; 1865–1882
Gustav Muheim; Conservative; 1877–1901	Appointed	Franz Schmid; Conservative; 1882–1890
Gustav Muheim; Conservative; 1877–1901	Appointed	Florian jun. Lusser; Conservative; 1891–1915
Josef Furrer; Conservative; 1901–1911	Appointed	Florian jun. Lusser; Conservative; 1891–1915
Franz Muheim; Conservative; 1912–1928	Appointed	Florian jun. Lusser; Conservative; 1891–1915
Franz Muheim; Conservative; 1912–1928	Appointed	Karl Huber; Conservative; 1915–1925
Franz Muheim; Conservative; 1912–1928	Appointed	Josef Wipfli; Conservative; 1925–1926
Franz Muheim; Conservative; 1912–1928	Appointed	Karl Muheim; Free Democratic Party; 1926–1927
Franz Muheim; Conservative; 1912–1928	Appointed	Ludwig Walker; Conservative; 1927–1947
Isidor Meyer; Conservative; 1928–1935	Appointed	Ludwig Walker; Conservative; 1927–1947
Leo Meyer; Conservative; 1935–1945	Appointed	Ludwig Walker; Conservative; 1927–1947
Gustav Muheim; Conservative; 1945–1951	Appointed	Ludwig Walker; Conservative; 1927–1947
Gustav Muheim; Conservative; 1945–1951	Appointed	Ludwig Danioth; Conservative; 1947–1971
Josef Indergand; Conservative; 1951–1953	Appointed	Ludwig Danioth; Conservative; 1947–1971
Emil Wipfli; Conservative; 1953–1971		Ludwig Danioth; Conservative; 1947–1971
Emil Wipfli; Conservative; 1953–1971	1955	Ludwig Danioth; Conservative; 1947–1971
Emil Wipfli; Conservative; 1953–1971	1959	Ludwig Danioth; Conservative; 1947–1971
Emil Wipfli; Conservative; 1953–1971	1963	Ludwig Danioth; Conservative; 1947–1971
Emil Wipfli; Conservative; 1953–1971	1967	Ludwig Danioth; Conservative; 1947–1971
Leo Arnold; Christian Democratic People's Party; 1971–1987	1971	Franz Muheim; Christian Democratic People's Party; 1971–1987
Leo Arnold; Christian Democratic People's Party; 1971–1987	1975	Franz Muheim; Christian Democratic People's Party; 1971–1987
Leo Arnold; Christian Democratic People's Party; 1971–1987	1979	Franz Muheim; Christian Democratic People's Party; 1971–1987
Leo Arnold; Christian Democratic People's Party; 1971–1987	1983	Franz Muheim; Christian Democratic People's Party; 1971–1987
Hans Danioth; Christian Democratic People's Party; 1987–1999	1987	Oswald Ziegler; Christian Democratic People's Party; 1987–1995
Hans Danioth; Christian Democratic People's Party; 1987–1999	1991	Oswald Ziegler; Christian Democratic People's Party; 1987–1995
Hans Danioth; Christian Democratic People's Party; 1987–1999	1995	Hansheiri Inderkum; Christian Democratic People's Party; 1995–2011
Hansruedi Stadler; Christian Democratic People's Party; 1999–2010	1999	Hansheiri Inderkum; Christian Democratic People's Party; 1995–2011
Hansruedi Stadler; Christian Democratic People's Party; 1999–2010	2003	Hansheiri Inderkum; Christian Democratic People's Party; 1995–2011
Hansruedi Stadler; Christian Democratic People's Party; 1999–2010	2007	Hansheiri Inderkum; Christian Democratic People's Party; 1995–2011
Markus Stadler; Green Liberal Party; 2010–2015	2010	Hansheiri Inderkum; Christian Democratic People's Party; 1995–2011
Markus Stadler; Green Liberal Party; 2010–2015	2011	Isidor Baumann; Christian Democratic People's Party; 2011–2019
Josef Dittli; FDP.The Liberals; 2015–present	2015	Isidor Baumann; Christian Democratic People's Party; 2011–2019
Josef Dittli; FDP.The Liberals; 2015–present	2019	Heidi Z’graggen; Christian Democratic People's Party; 2019–2023; The Centre; 2023–present
Josef Dittli; FDP.The Liberals; 2015–present	2023	Heidi Z’graggen; Christian Democratic People's Party; 2019–2023; The Centre; 2023–present

== Members of the National Council ==
Election	Councillor (Party)
1848	Florian sen. Lusser (Conservative)
1851	Florian sen. Lusser (Conservative)
1854	Florian sen. Lusser (Conservative)
1857	Florian sen. Lusser (Conservative)
1860	Alexander Muheim (Conservative)
1863	Alexander Muheim (Conservative)
1865	Josef Arnold (Conservative)
1866	Josef Arnold (Conservative)
1869	Josef Arnold (Conservative)
1872	Josef Arnold (Conservative)
1875	Josef Arnold (Conservative)
1878	Josef Arnold (Conservative)
1881	Josef Arnold (Conservative)
1884	Josef Arnold (Conservative)
1887	Josef Arnold (Conservative)
1890	Franz Schmid (Conservative)
1893	Franz Schmid (Conservative)
1896	Franz Schmid (Conservative)
1899	Franz Schmid (Conservative)
1902	Franz Schmid (Conservative)
1905	Gustav Muheim (Conservative)
1908	Gustav Muheim (Conservative)
1911	Josef Furrer (Conservative)
1914	Martin Gamma (FDP/PRD)
1917	Martin Gamma (FDP/PRD)
1919	Martin Gamma (FDP/PRD)
1922	Martin Gamma (FDP/PRD)
1925	Josef Lusser (FDP/PRD)
1928	Josef Lusser (FDP/PRD)
1931	Karl Muheim (FDP/PRD)
1935	Karl Muheim (FDP/PRD)
1939	Karl Muheim (FDP/PRD)
1943	Karl Muheim (FDP/PRD)
1947	Franz Arnold (FDP/PRD)
1951	Franz Arnold (FDP/PRD)
1955	Franz Arnold (FDP/PRD)
1959	Franz Arnold (FDP/PRD)
1963	Alfred Weber (FDP/PRD)
1967	Alfred Weber (FDP/PRD)
1971	Alfred Weber (FDP/PRD)
1975	Alfred Weber (FDP/PRD)
1979	Raymond Gamma (FDP/PRD)
1980	Franz Steinegger (FDP/PRD)
1983	Franz Steinegger (FDP/PRD)
1987	Franz Steinegger (FDP/PRD)
1991	Franz Steinegger (FDP/PRD)
1995	Franz Steinegger (FDP/PRD)
1999	Franz Steinegger (FDP/PRD)
2003	Gabi Huber (FDP/PRD later FDP/PLR)
2007	Gabi Huber (FDP/PRD later FDP/PLR)
2011	Gabi Huber (FDP/PRD later FDP/PLR)
2015	Beat Arnold (SVP/UDC)
2019	Simon Stadler (CVP/PDC / The Centre)
2023	Simon Stadler (CVP/PDC / The Centre)
