= 1899 Swiss federal election =

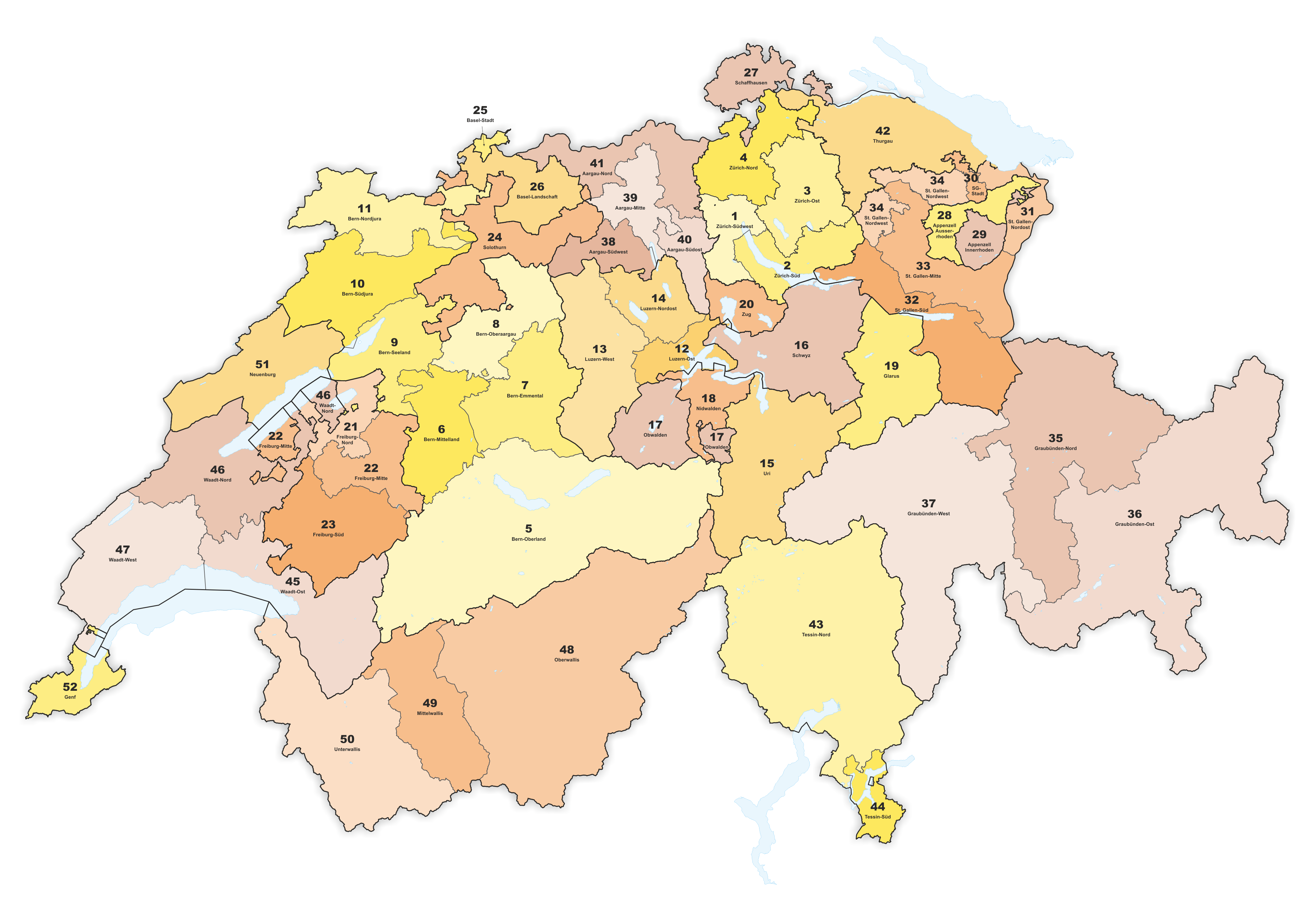
The 52 electoral districts

Federal elections were held in Switzerland on 26 October 1899. The Free Democratic Party retained its majority in the National Council.

== Electoral system ==
The 147 members of the National Council were elected in 52 single- and multi-member constituencies using a three-round system. Candidates had to receive a majority in the first or second round to be elected; if it went to a third round, only a plurality was required. Voters could cast as many votes as there were seats in their constituency. There was one seat for every 20,000 citizens, with seats allocated to cantons in proportion to their population.

== Results ==
Voter turnout was highest in Schaffhausen (where voting was compulsory) at 86.4% and lowest in Obwalden at 21.3%.

Party	Votes	%	Seats	+/–
Free Democratic Party	183,216	49.69	84	–2
Catholic People's Party	76,845	20.84	32	+2
Liberal Centre	51,764	14.04	20	–3
Social Democratic Party	35,488	9.62	4	+3
Democratic Group	18,003	4.88	7	0
Others	3,409	0.92	0	0
Total	368,725	100.00	147	0
Valid votes	368,725	91.78		
Invalid/blank votes	33,025	8.22		
Total votes	401,750	100.00		
Registered voters/turnout	737,696	54.46		
Source: Mackie & Rose, BFS (seats)

=== By constituency ===
Constituency	Seats	Party	Seats won	Elected members
Zürich 1	6	Free Democratic Party	3	Johann Jakob Amsler; Emil Zürcher; Ulrich Meister Jr.
Zürich 1	6	Liberal Centre	2	Hans Konrad Pestalozzi; Konrad Cramer
Zürich 1	6	Social Democratic Party	1	Jakob Vogelsanger
Zürich 2	4	Liberal Centre	3	Johann Jakob Abegg; Heinrich Berchtold; Johann Rudolf Amsler
Zürich 2	4	Free Democratic Party	1	Heinrich Hess
Zürich 3	4	Free Democratic Party	3	Rudolf Geilinger; Emil Stadler Sr.; Ludwig Forrer
Zürich 3	4	Democratic Group	1	Albert Kündig
Zürich 4	3	Liberal Centre	1	Heinrich Steinemann
Zürich 4	3	Free Democratic Party	1	Heinrich Kern
Zürich 4	3	Democratic Group	1	Johann Konrad Hörni
Bern 5	5	Free Democratic Party	5	Matthäus Zurbuchen; Arnold Gottlieb Bühler; Eduard Ruchti; Johann Jakob Rebmann; Franz Neuhaus
Bern 6	5	Free Democratic Party	3	Johann Hirter; Johann Jenny; Friedrich Bürgi
Bern 6	5	Liberal Centre	2	Edmund von Steiger; Ernst Wyss
Bern 7	4	Free Democratic Party	4	Adolf Müller; Fritz Bühlmann; Fritz Zumstein; Gottlieb Berger
Bern 8	4	Free Democratic Party	4	Hans Dinkelmann; Emil Moser; Johann Rudolf Steinhauer; Gottfried Bangerter
Bern 9	4	Free Democratic Party	4	Eduard Bähler; Jakob Freiburghaus; Johannes Zimmermann; Eduard Will
Bern 10	3	Free Democratic Party	3	Virgile Rossel; Albert Gobat; Albert Locher
Bern 11	2	Catholic Right	1	Casimir Folletête
Bern 11	2	Free Democratic Party	1	Henri Cuenat
Lucerne 12	2	Free Democratic Party	2	Friedrich Degen; Hermann Heller
Lucerne 13	3	Catholic Right	3	Candid Hochstrasser; Theodor Schmid; Josef Erni
Lucerne 14	2	Catholic Right	2	Josef Anton Schobinger; Dominik Fellmann
Uri 15	1	Catholic Right	1	Franz Schmid
Schwyz 16	3	Catholic Right	3	Vital Schwander Sr.; Josef Anton Ferdinand Büeler; Nikolaus Benziger
Obwalden 17	1	Catholic Right	1	Peter Anton Ming
Nidwalden 18	1	Catholic Right	1	Karl Niederberger
Glarus 19	2	Free Democratic Party	1	Rudolf Gallati
Glarus 19	2	Democratic Group	1	Eduard Blumer
Zug 20	1	Free Democratic Party	1	Klemens Iten
Fribourg 21	2	Catholic Right	1	Henri Schaller
Fribourg 21	2	Free Democratic Party	1	Constant Dinichert
Fribourg 22	2	Catholic Right	2	Vincent Gottofrey; Aloys Bossy
Fribourg 23	2	Catholic Right	2	Louis Grand; Alphonse Théraulaz
Solothurn 24	4	Free Democratic Party	3	Wilhelm Vigier; Albert Brosi; Joseph Gisi
Solothurn 24	4	Catholic Right	1	Franz Josef Hänggi
Basel-Stadt 25	4	Liberal Centre	2	Carl Koechlin; Isaak Iselin-Sarasin
Basel-Stadt 25	4	Social Democratic Party	1	Eugen Wullschleger
Basel-Stadt 25	4	Free Democratic Party	1	Heinrich David
Basel-Landschaft 26	3	Free Democratic Party	2	Jakob Buser; Johannes Suter
Basel-Landschaft 26	3	Bauern- und Arbeiterbund	1	Stephan Gschwind
Schaffhausen 27	2	Free Democratic Party	2	Robert Grieshaber; Wilhelm Joos
Appenzell Ausserrhoden 28	3	Free Democratic Party	3	Johann Konrad Eisenhut; Johann Jakob Sonderegger; Jakob Konrad Lutz
Appenzell Innerhoden 29	1	Liberal Centre	1	Karl Justin Sonderegger
St. Gallen 30	2	Free Democratic Party	1	Karl Emil Wild
St. Gallen 30	2	Democratic Group	1	J. A. Scherrer-Füllemann
St. Gallen 31	2	Catholic Right	2	Johann Gebhard Lutz; Johann Jakob Gächter
St. Gallen 32	2	Catholic Right	2	Johann Baptist Schubiger; Ferdinand Hidber
St. Gallen 33	3	Free Democratic Party	2	Johann Georg Berlinger; Carl Hilty
St. Gallen 33	3	Democratic Group	1	Carl Theodor Curti
St. Gallen 34	2	Catholic Right	2	Johann Joseph Keel; Othmar Staub
Grisons 35	2	Liberal Centre	1	Peter Theophil Bühler
Grisons 35	2	Democratic Group	1	Matthäus Risch
Grisons 36	2	Liberal Centre	1	Alfred von Planta
Grisons 36	2	Catholic Right	1	Caspar Decurtins
Grisons 37	1	Free Democratic Party	1	Andrea Vital
Aargau 38	3	Free Democratic Party	3	Arnold Künzli; Erwin Kurz; Jakob Lüthy
Aargau 39	3	Free Democratic Party	3	Olivier Zschokke; Max Alphonse Erismann; Hans Müri
Aargau 40	1	Catholic Right	1	Jakob Nietlispach
Aargau 41	3	Liberal Centre	2	Emil Albert Baldinger; Albert Ursprung
Aargau 41	3	Free Democratic Party	1	Josef Jäger
Thurgau 42	5	Free Democratic Party	4	Johann Konrad Egloff Jr.; Karl Alfred Fehr; Adolf Germann; Carl Eigenmann
Thurgau 42	5	Democratic Group	1	Emil Hofmann
Ticino 43	2	Free Democratic Party	2	Romeo Manzoni; Achille Borella
Ticino 44	4	Catholic Right	2	Giovanni Lurati; Giuseppe Motta
Ticino 44	4	Free Democratic Party	2	Filippo Rusconi; Alfredo Pioda
Vaud 45	5	Free Democratic Party	3	Charles-Eugène Fonjallaz; Émile Gaudard; Isaac Oyex
Vaud 45	5	Liberal Centre	2	Alois de Meuron; Édouard Secretan
Vaud 46	4	Free Democratic Party	4	Jean Cavat; Adolphe Jordan; Émile Paillard; Camille Decoppet
Vaud 47	3	Free Democratic Party	2	Adrien Thélin; Juste Lagier
Vaud 47	3	Liberal Centre	1	Louis-Charles Delarageaz
Valais 48	2	Catholic Right	2	Gustav Loretan; Alfred Perrig
Valais 49	1	Catholic Right	1	Joseph Kuntschen Sr.
Valais 50	2	Catholic Right	1	Henri Bioley
Valais 50	2	Free Democratic Party	1	Camille Défayes
Neuchâtel 51	5	Free Democratic Party	4	Robert Comtesse; Louis-Alexandre Martin; Alfred Jeanhenry; Jules-Albert Piguet
Neuchâtel 51	5	Liberal Centre	1	Jules Calame
Geneva 52	5	Free Democratic Party	3	Alfred Vincent; Marc-Eugène Ritzchel; Georges Favon
Geneva 52	5	Liberal Centre	1	Gustave Ador
Geneva 52	5	Social Democratic Party	1	Alexandre Triquet
Source: Gruner
