= 1896 Swiss federal election =

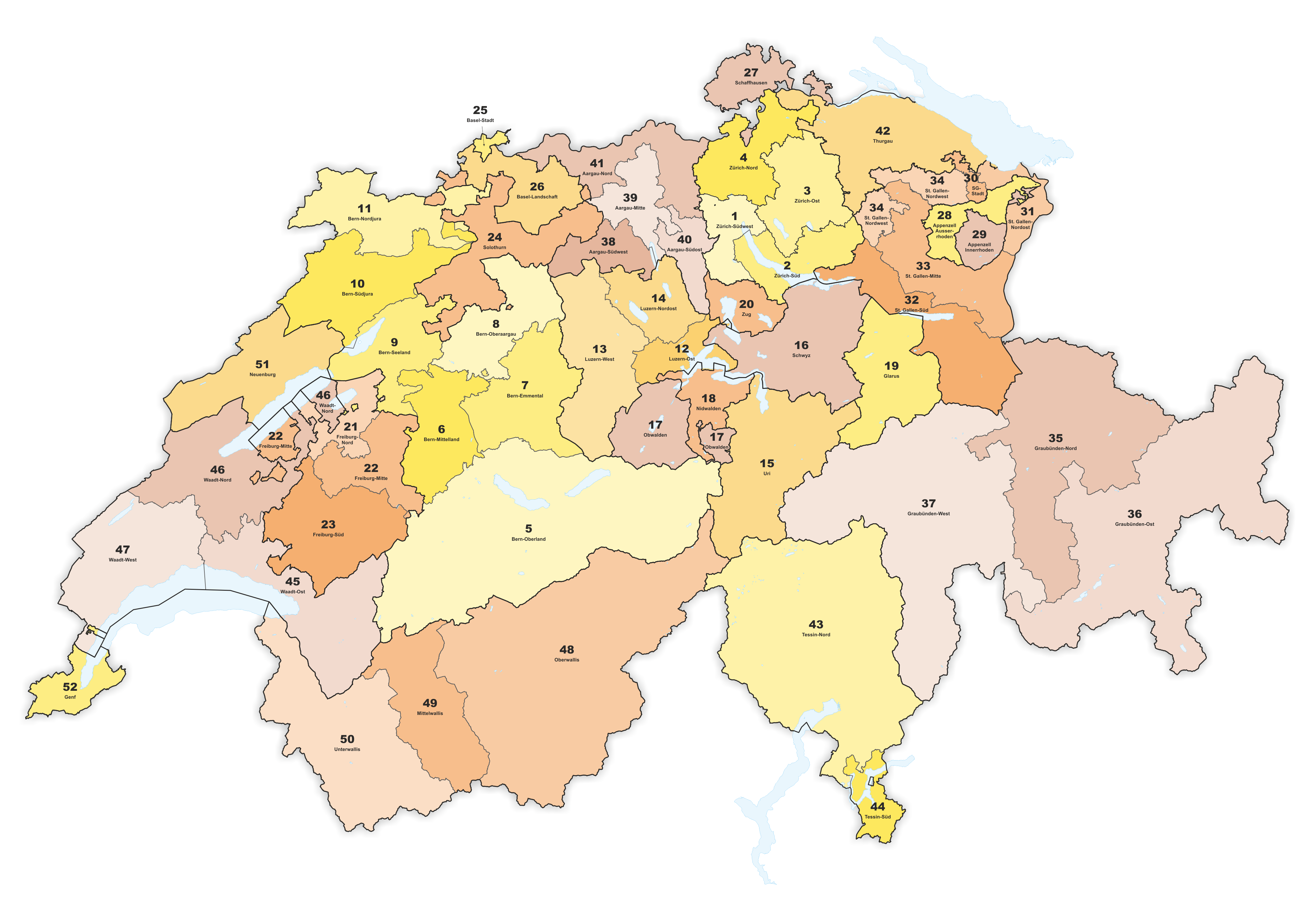
The 52 electoral districts

Federal elections were held in Switzerland on 25 October 1896. The Free Democratic Party retained its majority in the National Council.

== Electoral system ==
The 147 members of the National Council were elected in 52 single- and multi-member constituencies using a three-round system. Candidates had to receive a majority in the first or second round to be elected; if it went to a third round, only a plurality was required. Voters could cast as many votes as there were seats in their constituency. There was one seat for every 20,000 citizens, with seats allocated to cantons in proportion to their population.

== Results ==
Voter turnout was highest in Nidwalden at 90.3% (higher than the 89.3% in Schaffhausen where voting was compulsory) and lowest in Obwalden at 21.4%.

Party	Votes	%	Seats	+/–
Free Democratic Party	181,028	48.73	86	+12
Catholic People's Party	85,484	23.01	30	+1
Liberal Centre	54,012	14.54	23	–4
Democratic Group	19,946	5.37	7	–9
Social Democratic Party	25,304	6.81	1	0
Others	5,750	1.55	0	0
Total	371,524	100.00	147	0
Valid votes	371,524	93.29		
Invalid/blank votes	26,701	6.71		
Total votes	398,225	100.00		
Registered voters/turnout	713,367	55.82		
Source: Mackie & Rose, BFS (seats)

=== By constituency ===
Constituency	Seats	Party	Seats won	Elected members
Zürich 1	6	Free Democratic Party	3	Johann Jakob Amsler; Ulrich Meister Jr.; Johann Jakob Schäppi
Zürich 1	6	Liberal Centre	2	Hans Konrad Pestalozzi; Konrad Cramer
Zürich 1	6	Democratic Group	1	Jakob Vogelsanger
Zürich 2	4	Liberal Centre	3	Johann Jakob Abegg; Heinrich Berchtold; Hans Wunderli
Zürich 2	4	Free Democratic Party	1	Heinrich Hess
Zürich 3	4	Free Democratic Party	3	Rudolf Geilinger; Emil Stadler Sr.; Ludwig Forrer
Zürich 3	4	Democratic Group	1	Albert Kündig
Zürich 4	3	Free Democratic Party	2	Heinrich Kern; Johannes Moser
Zürich 4	3	Liberal Centre	1	Heinrich Steinemann
Bern 5	5	Free Democratic Party	5	Matthäus Zurbuchen; Arnold Gottlieb Bühler; Johann Jakob Rebmann; Franz Neuhaus; Eduard Ruchti
Bern 6	5	Free Democratic Party	4	Johann Jenny; Johann Hirter; Theodor Sourbeck; Friedrich Bürgi
Bern 6	5	Evangelical Right	1	Edmund von Steiger
Bern 7	4	Free Democratic Party	4	Adolf Müller; Fritz Bühlmann; Gottfried Joost; Gottlieb Berger
Bern 8	4	Free Democratic Party	4	Emil Moser; Hans Dinkelmann; Gottfried Bangerter; Johann Rudolf Steinhauer
Bern 9	4	Free Democratic Party	4	Eduard Bähler; Eduard Marti; Johannes Zimmermann; Jakob Freiburghaus
Bern 10	3	Free Democratic Party	3	Virgile Rossel; Joseph Stockmar; Albert Gobat
Bern 11	2	Catholic Right	2	Casimir Folletête; Joseph-Auguste Boinay
Lucerne 12	2	Free Democratic Party	2	Hermann Heller; Friedrich Degen
Lucerne 13	3	Catholic Right	3	Josef Erni; Candid Hochstrasser; Theodor Schmid
Lucerne 14	2	Catholic Right	2	Dominik Fellmann; Josef Anton Schobinger
Uri 15	1	Catholic Right	1	Franz Schmid
Schwyz 16	3	Catholic Right	3	Josef Anton Ferdinand Büeler; Vital Schwander Sr.; Nikolaus Benziger
Obwalden 17	1	Catholic Right	1	Peter Anton Ming
Nidwalden 18	1	Catholic Right	1	Karl Niederberger
Glarus 19	2	Democratic Group	1	Kaspar Schindler
Glarus 19	2	Free Democratic Party	1	Rudolf Gallati
Zug 20	1	Free Democratic Party	1	Klemens Iten
Fribourg 21	2	Liberal Centre	1	Henri Schaller
Fribourg 21	2	Free Democratic Party	1	Constant Dinichert
Fribourg 22	2	Catholic Right	2	Paul Aeby; Louis de Wuilleret
Fribourg 23	2	Catholic Right	2	Louis Grand; Alphonse Théraulaz
Solothurn 24	4	Free Democratic Party	3	Joseph Gisi; Wilhelm Vigier; Albert Brosi
Solothurn 24	4	Catholic Right	1	Joseph Anton Glutz
Basel-Stadt 25	4	Free Democratic Party	2	Ernst Brenner; Hermann Kinkelin
Basel-Stadt 25	4	Liberal Centre	1	Isaak Iselin-Sarasin
Basel-Stadt 25	4	Social Democratic Party	1	Eugen Wullschleger
Basel-Landschaft 26	3	Free Democratic Party	2	Johannes Suter; Jakob Buser
Basel-Landschaft 26	3	Bauern- und Arbeiterbund	1	Walter Meyer
Schaffhausen 27	2	Free Democratic Party	2	Wilhelm Joos; Robert Grieshaber
Appenzell Ausserrhoden 28	3	Free Democratic Party	3	Johann Konrad Eisenhut; Johann Conrad Sonderegger; Johann Jakob Sonderegger
Appenzell Innerhoden 29	1	Liberal Centre	1	Karl Justin Sonderegger
St. Gallen 30	2	Democratic Group	1	J. A. Scherrer-Füllemann
St. Gallen 30	2	Free Democratic Party	1	Karl Emil Wild
St. Gallen 31	2	Catholic Right	1	Johann Gebhard Lutz
St. Gallen 31	2	Liberal Centre	1	Christoph Tobler
St. Gallen 32	2	Catholic Right	2	Wilhelm Good; Johann Baptist Schubiger
St. Gallen 33	3	Free Democratic Party	2	Johann Georg Berlinger; Carl Hilty
St. Gallen 33	3	Democratic Group	1	Carl Theodor Curti
St. Gallen 34	2	Catholic Right	2	Johann Joseph Keel; Othmar Staub
Grisons 35	2	Liberal Centre	1	Peter Theophil Bühler
Grisons 35	2	Democratic Group	1	Matthäus Risch
Grisons 36	2	Catholic Right	1	Caspar Decurtins
Grisons 36	2	Liberal Centre	1	Alfred von Planta
Grisons 37	1	Liberal Centre	1	Thomas von Albertini
Aargau 38	3	Free Democratic Party	3	Arnold Künzli; Erwin Kurz; Jakob Lüthy
Aargau 39	3	Free Democratic Party	3	Olivier Zschokke; Hans Müri; Max Alphonse Erismann
Aargau 40	1	Catholic Right	1	Jakob Nietlispach
Aargau 41	3	Liberal Centre	2	Emil Albert Baldinger; Albert Ursprung
Aargau 41	3	Free Democratic Party	1	Josef Jäger
Thurgau 42	5	Liberal Centre	3	Friedrich Heinrich Häberlin; Karl Alfred Fehr; Gustav Merkle
Thurgau 42	5	Free Democratic Party	2	Josef Anton Koch; Adolf Germann
Ticino 43	2	Free Democratic Party	2	Achille Borella; Romeo Manzoni
Ticino 44	4	Free Democratic Party	4	Filippo Rusconi; Alfredo Pioda; Cesare Bolla; Demetrio Camuzzi
Vaud 45	5	Free Democratic Party	3	Charles-Eugène Fonjallaz; Louis Chausson; Émile Gaudard
Vaud 45	5	Liberal Centre	2	Charles Boiceau; Paul Cérésole
Vaud 46	4	Free Democratic Party	4	Émile Paillard; Jean Cavat; Louis Déglon; Adolphe Jordan
Vaud 47	3	Free Democratic Party	2	Juste Lagier; Adrien Thélin
Vaud 47	3	Liberal Centre	1	Louis-Charles Delarageaz
Valais 48	2	Catholic Right	2	Alfred Perrig; Gustav Loretan
Valais 49	1	Catholic Right	1	Joseph Kuntschen Sr.
Valais 50	2	Catholic Right	1	Henri Bioley
Valais 50	2	Free Democratic Party	1	Émile Gaillard
Neuchâtel 51	5	Free Democratic Party	4	Robert Comtesse; Louis-Alexandre Martin; Charles-Émile Tissot; Alfred Jeanhenry
Neuchâtel 51	5	Liberal Centre	1	Jules Calame
Geneva 52	5	Free Democratic Party	4	Adrien Lachenal; Henri Fazy; Georges Favon; Alfred Vincent
Geneva 52	5	Liberal Centre	1	Gustave Ador
Source: Gruner
