= 1908 Swiss federal election =

Election to the federal parliament in Switzerland

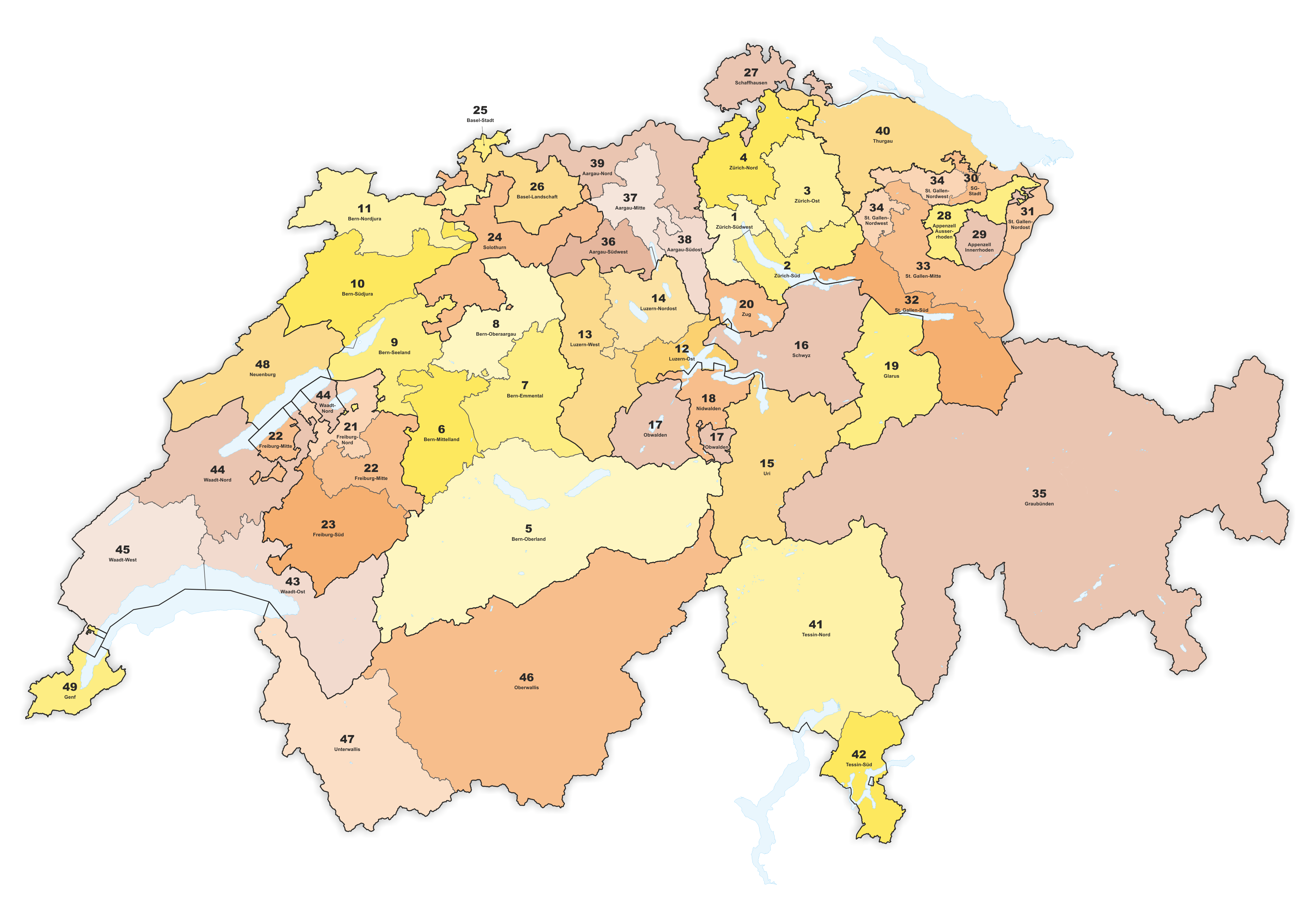
The 49 electoral districts

Federal elections were held in Switzerland on 29 October 1908. The Free Democratic Party retained its majority in the National Council.

== Electoral system ==
The 167 members of the National Council were elected in 49 single- and multi-member constituencies using a three-round system. Candidates had to receive a majority in the first or second round to be elected; if it went to a third round, only a plurality was required. Voters could cast as many votes as there were seats in their constituency. There was one seat for every 20,000 citizens, with seats allocated to cantons in proportion to their population.

== Results ==
Voter turnout was highest in Aargau at 83.1% (higher than the 80% in Schaffhausen, where voting was compulsory) and lowest in Zug at 16.1%.

Party	Votes	%	Seats	+/–
Free Democratic Party	202,732	50.91	105	+1
Catholic People's Party	81,733	20.52	34	–1
Social Democratic Party	70,003	17.58	7	+5
Liberal Centre	23,597	5.93	16	–3
Democratic Group	14,414	3.62	5	–1
Others	5,745	1.44	0	0
Total	398,224	100.00	167	0
Valid votes	398,224	93.32		
Invalid/blank votes	28,528	6.68		
Total votes	426,752	100.00		
Registered voters/turnout	809,508	52.72		
Source: Mackie & Rose, BFS (seats)

=== By constituency ===
Constituency	Seats	Party	Seats won	Elected members
Zürich 1	9	Free Democratic Party	8	Jakob Lutz; Emil Zürcher; Friedrich Fritschi; Alfred Frey; Walter Bissegger; Ulrich Meister Jr.; Albert Studler; Theodor Frey
Zürich 1	9	Social Democratic Party	1	Herman Greulich
Zürich 2	5	Free Democratic Party	4	Johann Rudolf Amsler; Heinrich Hess; Samuel Wanner; Karl August Koller
Zürich 2	5	Liberal Centre	1	Johann Jakob Abegg
Zürich 3	5	Free Democratic Party	4	Rudolf Geilinger; Friedrich Ottiker; Emil Stadler Sr.; Eduard Sulzer
Zürich 3	5	Social Democratic Party	1	Friedrich Studer
Zürich 4	3	Free Democratic Party	3	Johann Konrad Hörni; Jakob Walder; David Ringger
Bern 5	5	Free Democratic Party	5	Emil Lohner; Arnold Gottlieb Bühler; Johann Friedrich Michel; Johann Jakob Rebmann; Johannes Ritschard
Bern 6	6	Free Democratic Party	4	Johann Hirter; Johann Jenny; Eugen Huber; Jakob Scheidegger
Bern 6	6	Liberal Centre	2	Gustav König; Ernst Wyss
Bern 7	4	Free Democratic Party	4	Fritz Zumstein; Fritz Bühlmann; Adolf Müller; Johann Jakob Schär
Bern 8	4	Free Democratic Party	3	Arnold Gugelmann; Michael Hofer; Friedrich Buri
Bern 8	4	Social Democratic Party	1	August Rikli
Bern 9	4	Free Democratic Party	4	Jakob Freiburghaus; Johannes Zimmermann; Eduard Will; Alfred Moll
Bern 10	3	Free Democratic Party	3	Virgile Rossel; Albert Gobat; Albert Locher
Bern 11	3	Catholic Right	2	Joseph Choquard; Ernest Daucourt
Bern 11	3	Free Democratic Party	1	Henri Simonin
Lucerne 12	3	Free Democratic Party	3	Peter Knüsel; Otto Sidler; Hermann Heller
Lucerne 13	2	Catholic Right	3	Josef Anton Balmer; Candid Hochstrasser
Lucerne 14	2	Catholic Right	2	Heinrich Walther; Dominik Fellmann
Uri 15	1	Catholic Right	1	Gustav Muheim
Schwyz 16	3	Catholic Right	2	Josef Anton Ferdinand Büeler; Vital Schwander Sr.
Schwyz 16	3	Free Democratic Party	1	Kaspar Knobel
Obwalden 17	1	Catholic Right	1	Peter Anton Ming
Nidwalden 18	1	Catholic Right	1	Karl Niederberger
Glarus 19	2	Democratic Group	2	Eduard Blumer; David Legler
Zug 20	1	Free Democratic Party	1	Klemens Iten
Fribourg 21	2	Free Democratic Party	1	Constant Dinichert
Fribourg 21	2	Catholic Right	1	Louis de Diesbach
Fribourg 22	2	Catholic Right	2	Max de Diesbach; Charles de Wuilleret
Fribourg 23	2	Catholic Right	2	Eugène Grand; Alphonse Théraulaz
Solothurn 24	5	Free Democratic Party	4	Jakob Zimmermann; Eduard Bally; Max Studer; Adrian von Arx Sr.
Solothurn 24	5	Catholic Right	1	Franz Josef Hänggi
Basel-Stadt 25	6	Free Democratic Party	3	Emil Göttisheim; Christian Rothenberger; Johann Emil Müry
Basel-Stadt 25	6	Liberal Centre	2	Paul Speiser; Isaak Iselin-Sarasin
Basel-Stadt 25	6	Social Democratic Party	1	Alfred Brüstlein
Basel-Landschaft 26	3	Free Democratic Party	2	Jakob Buser; Johannes Suter
Basel-Landschaft 26	3	Democratic Group	1	Albert Schwander
Schaffhausen 27	2	Free Democratic Party	2	Carl Spahn; Robert Grieshaber
Appenzell Ausserrhoden 28	3	Free Democratic Party	2	Arthur Eugster; Hermann Altherr
Appenzell Ausserrhoden 28	3	Social Democratic Party	1	Howard Eugster
Appenzell Innerhoden 29	1	Catholic Right	1	Adolf Steuble
St. Gallen 30	3	Free Democratic Party	2	Karl Emil Wild; Albert Mächler
St. Gallen 30	3	Democratic Group	1	J. A. Scherrer-Füllemann
St. Gallen 31	3	Catholic Right	2	Johann Gebhard Lutz; Carl Zurburg
St. Gallen 31	3	Social Democratic Party	1	Heinrich Scherrer
St. Gallen 32	2	Catholic Right	2	Johann Baptist Schubiger; Emil Grünenfelder
St. Gallen 33	3	Free Democratic Party	3	Carl Hilty; Ernst Wagner; Robert Forrer
St. Gallen 34	2	Catholic Right	2	Othmar Staub; Thomas Holenstein Sr.
Grisons 35	5	Free Democratic Party	3	Johann Anton Caflisch; Eduard Walser; Andrea Vital
Grisons 35	5	Liberal Centre	1	Alfred von Planta
Grisons 35	5	Catholic Right	1	Johann Schmid
Aargau 36	3	Free Democratic Party	3	Johann Rudolf Suter; Arnold Künzli; Alwin Weber
Aargau 37	3	Free Democratic Party	3	Hans Müri; Conradin Zschokke; Max Alphonse Erismann
Aargau 38	1	Catholic Right	1	Jakob Nietlispach
Aargau 39	3	Catholic Right	2	Franz Xaver Eggspühler; Alfred Wyrsch
Aargau 39	3	Free Democratic Party	1	Friedrich Brunner
Thurgau 40	6	Free Democratic Party	4	Heinrich Häberlin; Carl Eigenmann; Adolf Germann; Jakob Müller
Thurgau 40	6	Democratic Group	1	Emil Hofmann
Thurgau 40	6	Catholic Right	1	Alfons von Streng
Ticino 41	4	Free Democratic Party	3	Achille Borella; Romeo Manzoni; Francesco Vassalli
Ticino 41	4	Social Democratic Party	1	Mario Ferri
Ticino 42	3	Free Democratic Party	2	Alfredo Pioda; Giuseppe Stoffel
Ticino 42	3	Catholic Right	1	Giuseppe Motta
Vaud 43	7	Free Democratic Party	4	Isaac Oyex; Alphonse Dubuis; Félix Bonjour; Émile Gaudard
Vaud 43	7	Liberal Centre	3	Alois de Meuron; Alexandre Emery; Édouard Secretan
Vaud 44	4	Free Democratic Party	4	Ernest Chuard; Camille Decoppet; Jules Roulet; Jean Cavat
Vaud 45	3	Free Democratic Party	3	Henri Thélin; Juste Lagier; Eugène Bugnon
Valais 46	4	Catholic Right	4	Alexander Seiler; Joseph Kuntschen Sr.; Raymond Evéquoz; Charles de Preux
Valais 47	2	Free Democratic Party	1	Eugène de Lavallaz
Valais 47	2	Catholic Right	1	Maurice Pellissier
Neuchâtel 48	6	Free Democratic Party	5	Louis Perrier; Paul-Ernest Mosimann; Louis-Alexandre Martin; Jules-Albert Piguet; Henri Calame
Neuchâtel 48	6	Liberal Centre	1	Jules Calame
Geneva 49	7	Liberal Centre	4	Théodore Turrettini; Gustave Ador; Jacques Rutty; Alfred Georg
Geneva 49	7	Free Democratic Party	3	François Besson; Henri Fazy; Jules-François Perréard
Source: Gruner
