= Adolf Germann =

Swiss politician (1857–1924)

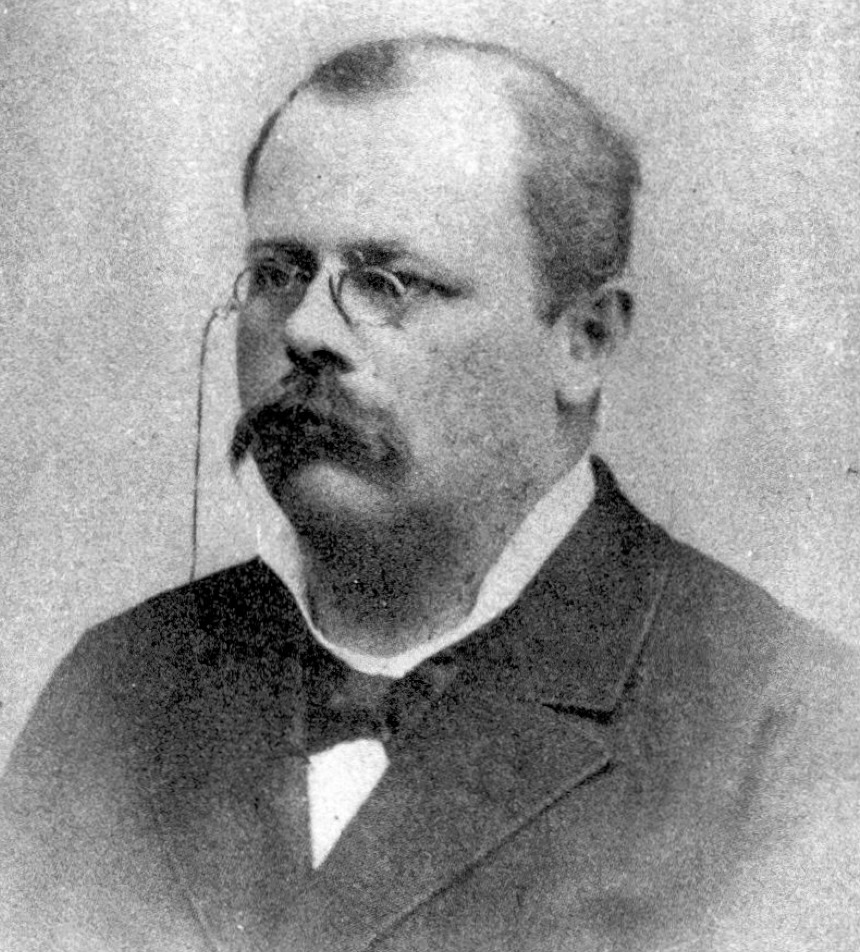
Adolf Germann

Adolf Germann (2 February 1857, in Bleiken – 7 May 1924, in Frauenfeld) was a Swiss politician and President of the Swiss National Council (1908/09).

Preceded by Paul Speiser	President of the National Council; 1908/1909	Succeeded by Virgile Rossel
