= 1914 Swiss federal election =

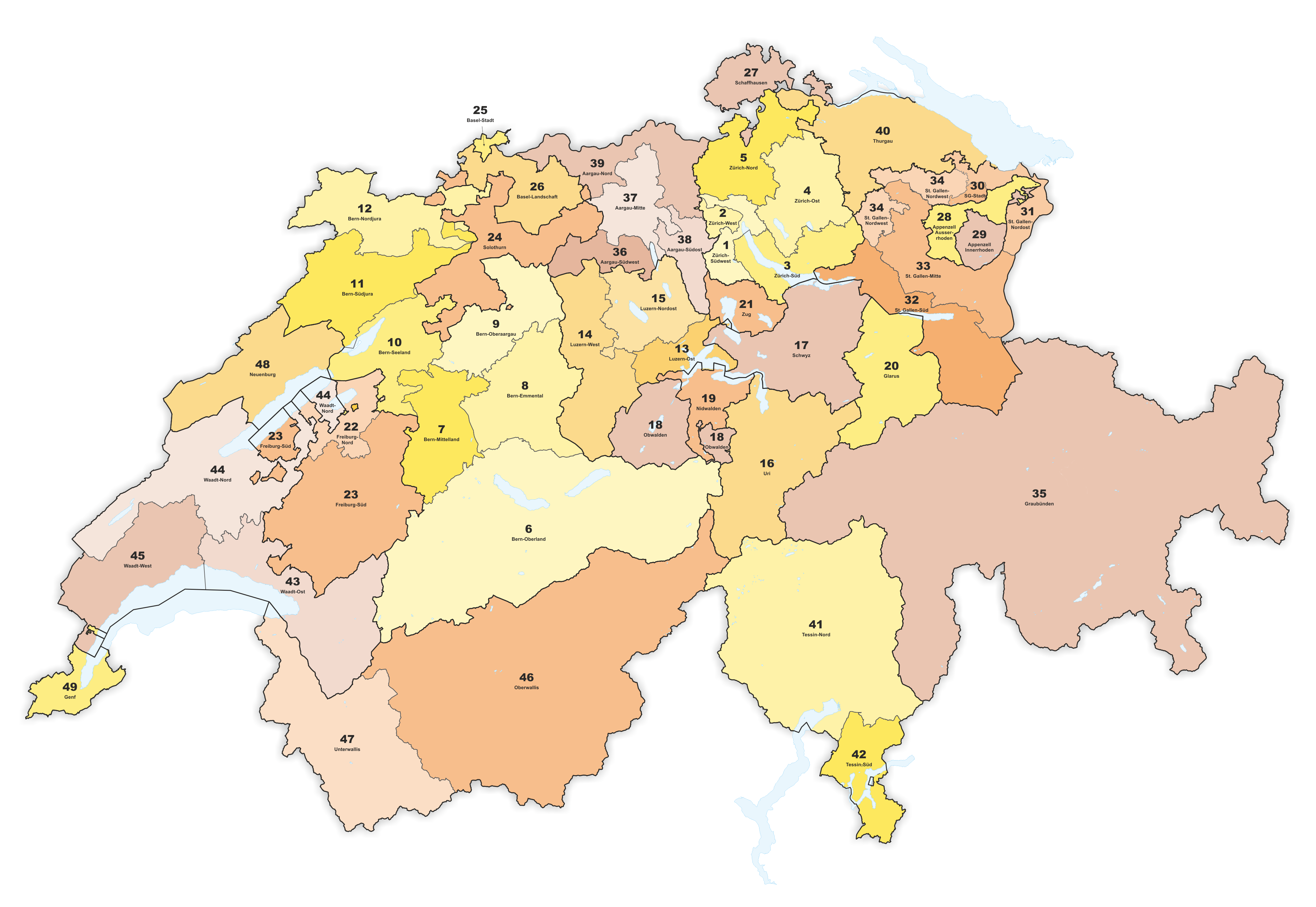
The 49 electoral districts

Federal elections were held in Switzerland on 25 October 1914. The Free Democratic Party retained its majority in the National Council.

== Electoral system ==
The 189 members of the National Council were elected in 49 single- and multi-member constituencies using a three-round system. Candidates had to receive a majority in the first or second round to be elected; if it went to a third round, only a plurality was required. Voters could cast as many votes as there were seats in their constituency. There was one seat for every 20,000 citizens, with seats allocated to cantons in proportion to their population.

== Results ==
=== National Council ===
Voter turnout was highest in Aargau at 85.9% (higher than the 78.7% in Schaffhausen where voting was compulsory) and lowest in Zug at 21.2%.

Party	Votes	%	Seats	+/–
Free Democratic Party	191,054	56.15	112	–3
Conservative People's Party	71,668	21.06	37	–1
Social Democratic Party	34,204	10.05	19	+3
Liberal Democratic Party	25,142	7.39	15	+2
Democratic Group	9,069	2.67	4	–2
Agrarian Movement	9,133	2.68	1	New
Democratic-Economic Association	9,133	2.68	1	New
Others	9,133	2.68	0	0
Total	340,270	100.00	189	0
Valid votes	340,270	86.05		
Invalid/blank votes	55,161	13.95		
Total votes	395,431	100.00		
Registered voters/turnout	851,377	46.45		
Source: Mackie & Rose

==== By constituency ====
Constituency	Seats	Party	Seats won	Elected members
Zürich 1	7	Free Democratic Party	7	Robert Billeter; Alfred Frey; Emil Zürcher; Walter Bissegger; Robert Schmid; Jakob Lutz; Friedrich Fritschi
Zürich 2	5	Social Democratic Party	5	Herman Greulich; Robert Seidel; Paul Pflüger; Robert Grimm; Johannes Sigg
Zürich 3	5	Free Democratic Party	4	Heinrich Hess; Karl August Koller; Theodor Odinga; Emil Rellstab
Zürich 3	5	Liberal Party	1	Johann Rudolf Amsler
Zürich 4	5	Free Democratic Party	3	Hans Sträuli; Friedrich Ottiker; Julius Guyer
Zürich 4	5	Social Democratic Party	2	Friedrich Studer; Hans Schenkel
Zürich 5	3	Free Democratic Party	3	Johann Konrad Hörni; Jakob Walder; David Ringger
Bern 6	6	Free Democratic Party	6	Robert Stucki; Arnold Gottlieb Bühler; Johann Jakob Rebmann; Emil Lohner; Hermann Schüpbach; Johann Friedrich Michel
Bern 7	7	Free Democratic Party	4	Johann Hirter; Johann Jenny; Michael Bühler; Jakob Scheidegger
Bern 7	7	Liberal Party	2	Fritz Burren; Gustav König
Bern 7	7	Social Democratic Party	1	Gustav Müller
Bern 8	4	Free Democratic Party	4	Friedrich Minder; Fritz Bühlmann; Johann Jakob Schär; Fritz Zumstein
Bern 9	4	Free Democratic Party	3	Arnold Gugelmann; Friedrich Buri; Michael Hofer
Bern 9	4	Social Democratic Party	1	August Rikli
Bern 10	5	Free Democratic Party	4	Alfred Moll; Jakob Freiburghaus; Karl Scheurer; Eduard Will
Bern 10	5	Social Democratic Party	1	Johann Näher
Bern 11	3	Free Democratic Party	2	Albert Locher; Robert Savoye
Bern 11	3	Social Democratic Party	1	Émile Ryser
Bern 12	3	Conservative People's Party	2	Joseph Choquard; Ernest Daucourt
Bern 12	3	Free Democratic Party	1	Henri Simonin
Lucerne 13	3	Free Democratic Party	3	Peter Knüsel; Hermann Heller; Otto Sidler
Lucerne 14	2	Conservative People's Party	3	Josef Anton Balmer; Anton Erni
Lucerne 15	3	Conservative People's Party	3	Franz Moser-Schär; Heinrich Walther; Dominik Fellmann
Uri 16	1	Free Democratic Party	1	Martin Gamma
Schwyz 17	3	Conservative People's Party	2	Josef Anton Ferdinand Büeler; Anton von Hettlingen
Schwyz 17	3	Free Democratic Party	1	Martin Steinegger
Obwalden 18	1	Conservative People's Party	1	Peter Anton Ming
Nidwalden 19	1	Conservative People's Party	1	Karl Niederberger
Glarus 20	2	Democratic Group	1	Eduard Blumer
Glarus 20	2	Free Democratic Party	1	Heinrich Jenny
Zug 21	1	Free Democratic Party	1	Hermann Stadlin
Fribourg 22	2	Free Democratic Party	1	Hermann Liechti
Fribourg 22	2	Conservative People's Party	1	Eugène Descheneaux
Fribourg 23	5	Conservative People's Party	4	Jean-Marie Musy; Max de Diesbach; Eugène Grand; Charles de Wuilleret
Fribourg 23	5	Free Democratic Party	1	A.-F.-L. Cailler
Solothurn 24	6	Free Democratic Party	4	Eduard Bally; Jakob Zimmermann; Max Studer; Adrian von Arx Sr.
Solothurn 24	6	Social Democratic Party	1	Hans Affolter
Solothurn 24	6	Conservative People's Party	1	Siegfried Hartmann
Basel-Stadt 25	7	Social Democratic Party	3	Eugen Wullschleger; Johannes Frei; Bernhard Jäggi
Basel-Stadt 25	7	Liberal Party	2	Carl Christoph Burckhardt; Isaak Iselin-Sarasin
Basel-Stadt 25	7	Free Democratic Party	2	Emil Göttisheim; Christian Rothenberger
Basel-Landschaft 26	4	Free Democratic Party	3	Heinrich Strub; Hermann Straumann; Albert Grieder
Basel-Landschaft 26	4	Democratic-Economic Association	1	Gustav Adolf Seiler
Schaffhausen 27	2	Free Democratic Party	2	Carl Spahn; Robert Grieshaber
Appenzell Ausserrhoden 28	3	Free Democratic Party	2	Arthur Eugster; Johannes Eisenhut
Appenzell Ausserrhoden 28	3	Social Democratic Party	1	Howard Eugster
Appenzell Innerhoden 29	1	Conservative People's Party	1	Adolf Steuble
St. Gallen 30	4	Free Democratic Party	3	Karl Emil Wild; Eduard Scherrer; Albert Mächler
St. Gallen 30	4	Democratic Group	1	J. A. Scherrer-Füllemann
St. Gallen 31	4	Conservative People's Party	2	Carl Zurburg; Johann Baptist Eisenring
St. Gallen 31	4	Free Democratic Party	1	Ernst Schmidheiny
St. Gallen 31	4	Democratic Group	1	Heinrich Otto Weber
St. Gallen 32	3	Free Democratic Party	3	Gallus Schwendener; Ernst Wagner; Robert Forrer
St. Gallen 33	2	Conservative People's Party	2	Johann Baptist Schubiger; Emil Grünenfelder
St. Gallen 34	2	Conservative People's Party	2	Othmar Staub; Thomas Holenstein Sr.
Grisons 35	6	Free Democratic Party	4	Johann Anton Caflisch; Eduard Walser; Paul Raschein Sr.; Andrea Vital
Grisons 35	6	Liberal Party	1	Alfred von Planta
Grisons 35	6	Conservative People's Party	1	Johann Schmid
Aargau 36	3	Free Democratic Party	3	Johann Rudolf Suter; Alwin Weber; Otto Hunziker
Aargau 37	4	Free Democratic Party	4	Hans Siegrist; Emil Keller; Heinrich Eugen Abt; Conradin Zschokke
Aargau 38	1	Conservative People's Party	1	Jakob Nietlispach
Aargau 39	4	Conservative People's Party	2	Alfred Wyrsch; Franz Xaver Eggspühler
Aargau 39	4	Free Democratic Party	2	Gustav Adolf Ursprung; Joseph Jäger
Thurgau 40	7	Free Democratic Party	4	Oskar Ullmann; Heinrich Häberlin; Jakob Müller; Jakob Zingg
Thurgau 40	7	Democratic Group	1	Emil Hofmann
Thurgau 40	7	Agrarian Movement	1	Carl Eigenmann
Thurgau 40	7	Conservative People's Party	1	Alfons von Streng
Ticino 41	4	Free Democratic Party	3	Emilio Bossi; Achille Borella; Francesco Vassalli
Ticino 41	4	Conservative People's Party	1	Angelo Tarchini
Ticino 42	4	Free Democratic Party	2	Evaristo Garbani-Nerini; Brenno Bertoni
Ticino 42	4	Liberal Party	1	Francesco Balli
Ticino 42	4	Conservative People's Party	1	Giuseppe Cattori
Vaud 43	8	Free Democratic Party	5	Paul Maillefer; Charles-Eugène Fonjallaz; Émile Gaudard; Alfred Pilliod; Félix Bonjour
Vaud 43	8	Liberal Party	3	Alois de Meuron; Édouard Secretan; Alexandre Emery
Vaud 44	5	Free Democratic Party	4	Ernest Chuard; Louis Reymond; Henri Grobet; Fritz Bosset
Vaud 44	5	Liberal Party	1	Armand Piguet
Vaud 45	3	Free Democratic Party	2	John-Henri Mermoud; Alfred Jaton
Vaud 45	3	Liberal Party	1	Jean Yersin
Valais 46	4	Conservative People's Party	4	Alexander Seiler; Joseph Kuntschen Sr.; Raymond Evéquoz; Charles de Preux
Valais 47	2	Conservative People's Party	1	Jules Tissières
Valais 47	2	Free Democratic Party	1	Eugène de Lavallaz
Neuchâtel 48	7	Free Democratic Party	4	Auguste Leuba; Paul-Ernest Mosimann; Henri Calame; Jules-Albert Piguet
Neuchâtel 48	7	Social Democratic Party	2	Charles Naine; Ernest-Paul Graber
Neuchâtel 48	7	Liberal Party	1	Eugène Bonhôte
Geneva 49	8	Liberal Party	3	Gustave Ador; Albert-Édouard Maunoir; Horace Micheli
Geneva 49	8	Free Democratic Party	3	Henri Fazy; Marc-Ernest Peter; Jacques-Louis Willemin
Geneva 49	8	Social Democratic Party	1	Jean Sigg
Geneva 49	8	Conservative People's Party	1	Firmin Ody
Source: Gruner

=== Council of States ===
Party	Seats	+/–
Free Democratic Party	24	–1
Swiss Conservative People's Party	16	0
Liberal Democratic Party	2	+1
Democratic Group	1	0
Social Democratic Party	1	0
Total	44	0

==== By canton ====
Constituency	Seats	Party	Elected members
Aargau	2	Free Democratic Party	Peter Emil Isler
Aargau	2	Free Democratic Party	Gottfried Keller
Appenzell Ausserrhoden	1	Free Democratic Party	Johannes Baumann
Appenzell Innerrhoden	1	Conservative People's Party	Johann Baptist Edmund Dähler
Basel-Landschaft	1	Free Democratic Party	Gustav Johann Schneider
Basel-Stadt	1	Free Democratic Party	Paul Scherer
Bern	2	Free Democratic Party	Gottfried Kunz
Bern	2	Free Democratic Party	Adolf von Steiger
Fribourg	2	Conservative People's Party	Georges Python
Fribourg	2	Conservative People's Party	Ernest de Weck
Geneva	2	Free Democratic Party	Adrien Lachenal
Geneva	2	Liberal Party	Jacques Rutty
Glarus	2	Democratic Group	David Legler
Glarus	2	Free Democratic Party	Philippe Mercier
Grisons	2	Free Democratic Party	Andreas Laelys
Grisons	2	Conservative People's Party	Friedrich Brügger
Lucerne	2	Conservative People's Party	Josef Dürig
Lucerne	2	Conservative People's Party	Josef Winiger
Neuchâtel	2	Free Democratic Party	Auguste Pettavel
Neuchâtel	2	Liberal Party	Paul Robert-Tissot
Nidwalden	1	Conservative People's Party	Jakob Konstantin Wyrsch
Obwalden	1	Conservative People's Party	Adalbert Wirz
Schaffhausen	2	Free Democratic Party	Albert Ammann
Schaffhausen	2	Free Democratic Party	Heinrich Bolli
Schwyz	2	Conservative People's Party	Martin Ochsner
Schwyz	2	Conservative People's Party	Josef Maria Schuler
Solothurn	2	Free Democratic Party	Casimir von Arx
Solothurn	2	Free Democratic Party	Oskar Munzinger
St. Gallen	2	Free Democratic Party	Johannes Geel
St. Gallen	2	Social Democratic Party	Heinrich Scherrer
Ticino	2	Free Democratic Party	Stefano Gabuzzi
Ticino	2	Free Democratic Party	Adolfo Soldini
Thurgau	2	Free Democratic Party	Johann Georg Leumann
Thurgau	2	Free Democratic Party	Albert Böhi
Uri	2	Conservative People's Party	Florian Lusser
Uri	2	Conservative People's Party	Franz Muheim
Vaud	2	Free Democratic Party	Adrien Thélin
Vaud	2	Free Democratic Party	Henri Simon
Valais	2	Conservative People's Party	Joseph Ribordy
Valais	2	Conservative People's Party	Heinrich von Roten
Zug	2	Conservative People's Party	Josef Andermatt
Zug	2	Conservative People's Party	Josef Hildebrand
Zürich	2	Free Democratic Party	Oskar Wettstein
Zürich	2	Free Democratic Party	Paul Usteri
