= 1959 Swiss federal election =

Federal elections were held in Switzerland on 25 October 1959. The Social Democratic Party and the Free Democratic Party emerged as the largest parties in the National Council, each winning 51 of the 196 seats.

== Results ==
=== National Council ===
Party	Votes	%	Seats	+/–
Social Democratic Party	259,139	26.38	51	–2
Free Democratic Party	232,557	23.67	51	+1
Conservative Christian Social Party	229,088	23.32	47	0
Party of Farmers, Traders and Independents	113,611	11.56	23	+1
Alliance of Independents	54,049	5.50	10	0
Swiss Party of Labour	26,346	2.68	3	–1
Liberal Democratic Party	22,934	2.33	5	0
Social-Political Group	21,170	2.15	4	0
Evangelical People's Party	14,038	1.43	2	+1
Other parties	9,438	0.96	0	–
Total	982,370	100.00	196	0
Valid votes	982,370	97.40		
Invalid/blank votes	26,193	2.60		
Total votes	1,008,563	100.00		
Registered voters/turnout	1,473,155	68.46		
Source: Nohlen & Stöver

==== By constituency ====
Constituency	Seats	Electorate	Turnout	Party	Votes	Seats won
Aargau	13	94,726	79,872	Social Democratic Party	310,962	4
Aargau	13	94,726	79,872	Conservative People's Party	226,341	3
Aargau	13	94,726	79,872	Free Democratic Party	184,747	2
Aargau	13	94,726	79,872	Party of Farmers, Traders and Independents	147,716	2
Aargau	13	94,726	79,872	Ring of Independents	65,889	1
Aargau	13	94,726	79,872	Evangelical People's Party	32,802	0
Aargau	13	94,726	79,872	Free Voters for the Repeal of Compulsory Voting	21,883	0
Appenzell Ausserrhoden	2	Elected unopposed		Free Democratic Party		1
Appenzell Ausserrhoden	2	Elected unopposed		Social Democratic Party		1
Appenzell Innerrhoden	1	3,624	1,361	Conservative Christian Social Party	1,010	1
Basel-Landschaft	4	38,597	23,744	Social Democratic Party	31,119	1
Basel-Landschaft	4	38,597	23,744	Free Democratic Party	24,003	1
Basel-Landschaft	4	38,597	23,744	Party of Farmers, Traders and Independents	13,944	1
Basel-Landschaft	4	38,597	23,744	Aktion Kanton Basel	12,772	0
Basel-Landschaft	4	38,597	23,744	Conservative Christian Social Party	12,172	1
Basel-Stadt	8	67,346	40,765	Social Democratic Party	96,439	3
Basel-Stadt	8	67,346	40,765	Free Democratic Party	63,876	2
Basel-Stadt	8	67,346	40,765	Conservative Christian Social Party	43,516	1
Basel-Stadt	8	67,346	40,765	Liberal Party	40,230	1
Basel-Stadt	8	67,346	40,765	Ring of Independents	35,809	1
Basel-Stadt	8	67,346	40,765	Party of Labour	28,881	0
Basel-Stadt	8	67,346	40,765	Evangelical People's Party	13,185	0
Bern	33	255,261	166,701	Social Democratic Party	1,917,983	12
Bern	33	255,261	166,701	Party of Farmers, Traders and Independents	1,799,135	11
Bern	33	255,261	166,701	Free Democratic Party	917,183	6
Bern	33	255,261	166,701	Conservative Christian Social Party	383,320	2
Bern	33	255,261	166,701	Ring of Independents	296,288	2
Bern	33	255,261	166,701	Non-partisan List of Christian Citizens	66,143	0
Fribourg	7	45,817	31,802	Conservative Christian Social Party	112,479	4
Fribourg	7	45,817	31,802	Free Democratic Party	49,507	1
Fribourg	7	45,817	31,802	Social Democratic Party	30,241	1
Fribourg	7	45,817	31,802	Party of Farmers, Traders and Independents	27,010	1
Geneva	8	67,674	30,914	Free Democratic Party	64,157	3
Geneva	8	67,674	30,914	Party of Labour	63,488	2
Geneva	8	67,674	30,914	Conservative Christian Social Party	41,879	1
Geneva	8	67,674	30,914	Social Democratic Party	38,125	1
Geneva	8	67,674	30,914	Liberal Party	36,948	1
Glarus	2	10,782	8,357	Social Democratic Party	6,505	1
Glarus	2	10,782	8,357	Free Democratic Party	4,723	1
Glarus	2	10,782	8,357	Social-Political Group	3,121	0
Glarus	2	10,782	8,357	Conservative Christian Social Party	2,159	0
Grisons	6	37,906	27,854	Conservative Christian Social Party	65,966	2
Grisons	6	37,906	27,854	Social-Political Group	46,225	2
Grisons	6	37,906	27,854	Free Democratic Party	26,303	1
Grisons	6	37,906	27,854	Social Democratic Party	24,564	1
Lucerne	9	69,773	59,301	Conservative Christian Social Party	270,546	5
Lucerne	9	69,773	59,301	Free Democratic Party	203,944	4
Lucerne	9	69,773	59,301	Social Democratic Party	50,539	0
Neuchâtel	5	41,660	23,229	Social Democratic Party	42,759	2
Neuchâtel	5	41,660	23,229	Free Democratic Party	30,354	2
Neuchâtel	5	41,660	23,229	Liberal Party	20,658	1
Neuchâtel	5	41,660	23,229	Party of Labour	12,146	0
Neuchâtel	5	41,660	23,229	National Progressive Party	6,953	0
Nidwalden	1	5,803	2,608	Conservative Christian Social Party	2,114	1
Obwalden	1	6,273	2,623	Conservative Christian Social Party	1,952	1
Obwalden	1	6,273	2,623	Liberal Party	563	0
Schaffhausen	2	17,801	15,283	Social Democratic Party	12,820	1
Schaffhausen	2	17,801	15,283	Free Democratic Party	8,591	1
Schaffhausen	2	17,801	15,283	Ring of Independents	6,079	0
Schwyz	3	21,194	15,901	Conservative Christian Social Party	25,141	2
Schwyz	3	21,194	15,901	Social Democratic Party	11,113	1
Schwyz	3	21,194	15,901	Free Democratic Party	10,527	0
Solothurn	7	55,169	45,939	Free Democratic Party	135,929	3
Solothurn	7	55,169	45,939	Social Democratic Party	96,818	2
Solothurn	7	55,169	45,939	Conservative Christian Social Party	79,664	2
St. Gallen	13	87,576	67,499	Conservative Christian Social Party	383,322	6
St. Gallen	13	87,576	67,499	Free Democratic Party	236,576	4
St. Gallen	13	87,576	67,499	Social Democratic Party	150,671	2
St. Gallen	13	87,576	67,499	Ring of Independents	65,031	1
Ticino	7	50,924	35,265	Free Democratic Party	99,493	3
Ticino	7	50,924	35,265	Conservative Christian Social Party	95,473	3
Ticino	7	50,924	35,265	Social Democratic Party	36,558	1
Thurgau	6	43,424	32,179	Social Democratic Party	53,313	2
Thurgau	6	43,424	32,179	Party of Farmers, Traders and Independents	48,594	2
Thurgau	6	43,424	32,179	Conservative Christian Social Party	47,425	1
Thurgau	6	43,424	32,179	Free Democratic Party	38,491	1
Uri	1	8,721	4,550	Free Democratic Party	3,417	1
Vaud	16	119,220	65,588	Free Democratic Party	314,653	6
Vaud	16	119,220	65,588	Social Democratic Party	306,580	5
Vaud	16	119,220	65,588	Liberal Party	146,489	2
Vaud	16	119,220	65,588	Party of Labour	116,746	1
Vaud	16	119,220	65,588	Party of Farmers, Traders and Independents	92,844	1
Vaud	16	119,220	65,588	Conservative Christian Social Party	52,542	1
Valais	7	49,350	36,635	Conservative Christian Social Party	157,530	5
Valais	7	49,350	36,635	Free Democratic Party	49,459	1
Valais	7	49,350	36,635	Social Democratic Party	32,311	1
Valais	7	49,350	36,635	Social Movement - Peasants, Workers and Independents	14,520	0
Zug	2	13,067	8,296	Conservative Christian Social Party	7,630	1
Zug	2	13,067	8,296	Free Democratic Party	5,060	1
Zug	2	13,067	8,296	Social Democratic Party	3,276	0
Zürich	32	261,738	182,406	Social Democratic Party	1,606,287	9
Zürich	32	261,738	182,406	Ring of Independents	879,528	5
Zürich	32	261,738	182,406	Free Democratic Party	854,519	5
Zürich	32	261,738	182,406	Party of Farmers, Traders and Independents	847,913	5
Zürich	32	261,738	182,406	Conservative Christian Social Party	725,719	4
Zürich	32	261,738	182,406	Social-Political Group	336,388	2
Zürich	32	261,738	182,406	Evangelical People's Party	315,777	2
Zürich	32	261,738	182,406	Party of Labour	162,424	0
Source: Bundesblatt, 3 December 1959

=== Council of the States ===
In several cantons the members of the Council of the States were chosen by the cantonal parliaments.

Party	Seats	+/–
Conservative Christian Social Party	17	0
Free Democratic Party	13	+1
Social Democratic Party	4	–1
Party of Farmers, Traders and Independents	3	0
Liberal Democratic Party	3	0
Social-Political Group	1	–1
Other parties	3	+1
Total	44	0
Source: Nohlen & Stöver
