= 1947 Swiss federal election =

Federal elections were held in Switzerland on 26 October 1947. Although the Social Democratic Party received the most votes, the Free Democratic Party secured the most seats in the National Council, winning 52 of the 194 seats.

== Results ==
=== National Council ===
| Party | Votes | % | Seats | +/– |
|---|---|---|---|---|
| Social Democratic Party | 251,625 | 26.20 | 48 | –8 |
| Free Democratic Party | 220,486 | 22.96 | 52 | +5 |
| Conservative People's Party | 203,202 | 21.16 | 44 | +1 |
| Party of Farmers, Traders and Independents | 115,976 | 12.08 | 21 | –1 |
| Swiss Party of Labour | 49,353 | 5.14 | 7 | New |
| Alliance of Independents | 42,428 | 4.42 | 8 | +1 |
| Liberal Democratic Party | 30,492 | 3.18 | 7 | –1 |
| Social-Political Group | 28,096 | 2.93 | 5 | 0 |
| Evangelical People's Party | 9,072 | 0.94 | 1 | 0 |
| Liberal Socialist Party | 4,626 | 0.48 | 1 | +1 |
| Other parties | 4,931 | 0.51 | 0 | –2 |
| Total | 960,287 | 100.00 | 194 | 0 |
| Valid votes | 960,287 | 97.44 | | |
| Invalid/blank votes | 25,212 | 2.56 | | |
| Total votes | 985,499 | 100.00 | | |
| Registered voters/turnout | 1,360,453 | 72.44 | | |
Source: Mackie & Rose, Nohlen & Stöver

==== By constituency ====
| Constituency | Seats | Electorate | Turnout | Party | Votes | Seats won |
|---|---|---|---|---|---|---|
| Aargau | 12 | 85,603 | 74,880 | Social Democratic Party | 305,619 | 4 |
| Aargau | 12 | 85,603 | 74,880 | Conservative People's Party | 192,099 | 3 |
| Aargau | 12 | 85,603 | 74,880 | Free Democratic Party | 160,596 | 3 |
| Aargau | 12 | 85,603 | 74,880 | Party of Farmers, Traders and Independents | 141,229 | 2 |
| Aargau | 12 | 85,603 | 74,880 | Evangelical People's Party | 39,355 | 0 |
| Aargau | 12 | 85,603 | 74,880 | Swiss Party of Labour | 17,826 | 0 |
| Appenzell Ausserrhoden | 2 | Elected unopposed | | Free Democratic Party | | 1 |
| Appenzell Ausserrhoden | 2 | Elected unopposed | | Social Democratic Party | | 1 |
| Appenzell Innerrhoden | 1 | 3,548 | 1,674 | Conservative People's Party | 1,404 | 1 |
| Basel-Landschaft | 4 | 31,344 | 21,160 | Social Democratic Party | 24,891 | 1 |
| Basel-Landschaft | 4 | 31,344 | 21,160 | Free Democratic Party | 6,401 | 1 |
| Basel-Landschaft | 4 | 31,344 | 21,160 | Social-Political Group | 15,473 | 1 |
| Basel-Landschaft | 4 | 31,344 | 21,160 | Party of Farmers, Traders and Independents | 10,789 | 1 |
| Basel-Landschaft | 4 | 31,344 | 21,160 | Conservative People's Party | 9,372 | 0 |
| Basel-Landschaft | 4 | 31,344 | 21,160 | Swiss Party of Labour | 6,439 | 0 |
| Basel-Stadt | 8 | 58,809 | 39,210 | Social Democratic Party | 63,596 | 2 |
| Basel-Stadt | 8 | 58,809 | 39,210 | Swiss Party of Labour | 61,343 | 1 |
| Basel-Stadt | 8 | 58,809 | 39,210 | Free Democratic Party | 50,514 | 2 |
| Basel-Stadt | 8 | 58,809 | 39,210 | Liberal Party | 45,646 | 1 |
| Basel-Stadt | 8 | 58,809 | 39,210 | Ring of Independents | 40,859 | 1 |
| Basel-Stadt | 8 | 58,809 | 39,210 | Conservative People's Party | 36,564 | 1 |
| Basel-Stadt | 8 | 58,809 | 39,210 | Party of Farmers, Traders and Independents | 12,305 | 0 |
| Bern | 33 | 241,687 | 161,927 | Social Democratic Party | 2,112,103 | 14 |
| Bern | 33 | 241,687 | 161,927 | Party of Farmers, Traders and Independents | 1,787,254 | 11 |
| Bern | 33 | 241,687 | 161,927 | Free Democratic Party | 906,945 | 6 |
| Bern | 33 | 241,687 | 161,927 | Conservative People's Party | 324,852 | 2 |
| Bern | 33 | 241,687 | 161,927 | Swiss Party of Labour | 83,170 | 0 |
| Fribourg | 7 | 46,110 | 31,504 | Conservative People's Party | 123,538 | 4 |
| Fribourg | 7 | 46,110 | 31,504 | Free Democratic Party | 53,790 | 2 |
| Fribourg | 7 | 46,110 | 31,504 | Social Democratic Party | 27,479 | 1 |
| Fribourg | 7 | 46,110 | 31,504 | Party of Farmers, Traders and Independents | 12,207 | 0 |
| Geneva | 8 | 56,985 | 30,362 | Free Democratic Party | 70,839 | 3 |
| Geneva | 8 | 56,985 | 30,362 | Swiss Party of Labour | 70,286 | 2 |
| Geneva | 8 | 56,985 | 30,362 | Liberal Party | 42,982 | 2 |
| Geneva | 8 | 56,985 | 30,362 | Conservative People's Party | 33,670 | 1 |
| Geneva | 8 | 56,985 | 30,362 | Social Democratic Party | 22,299 | 0 |
| Geneva | 8 | 56,985 | 30,362 | Republican Party for the United States of Europe | 1,085 | 0 |
| Glarus | 2 | 10,904 | 8,509 | Social Democratic Party | 6,479 | 1 |
| Glarus | 2 | 10,904 | 8,509 | Free Democratic Party | 5,110 | 1 |
| Glarus | 2 | 10,904 | 8,509 | Social-Political Group | 4,893 | 0 |
| Grisons | 6 | 37,333 | 28,102 | Conservative People's Party | 62,606 | 3 |
| Grisons | 6 | 37,333 | 28,102 | Social-Political Group | 54,974 | 2 |
| Grisons | 6 | 37,333 | 28,102 | Free Democratic Party | 26,814 | 1 |
| Grisons | 6 | 37,333 | 28,102 | Social Democratic Party | 19,992 | 0 |
| Lucerne | 9 | 65,029 | 52,805 | Conservative People's Party | 236,112 | 5 |
| Lucerne | 9 | 65,029 | 52,805 | Free Democratic Party | 173,509 | 3 |
| Lucerne | 9 | 65,029 | 52,805 | Social Democratic Party | 59,794 | 1 |
| Neuchâtel | 5 | 40,363 | 23,399 | Social Democratic Party | 42,274 | 2 |
| Neuchâtel | 5 | 40,363 | 23,399 | Free Democratic Party | 30,195 | 2 |
| Neuchâtel | 5 | 40,363 | 23,399 | Liberal Party | 28,217 | 1 |
| Neuchâtel | 5 | 40,363 | 23,399 | Swiss Party of Labour | 13,195 | 0 |
| Nidwalden | 1 | 5,449 | 3,489 | Conservative People's Party | 2,858 | 1 |
| Nidwalden | 1 | 5,449 | 3,489 | Others | 536 | 0 |
| Obwalden | 1 | 6,190 | 2,246 | Conservative People's Party | 1,988 | 1 |
| Schaffhausen | 2 | 17,106 | 15,143 | Social Democratic Party | 13,425 | 1 |
| Schaffhausen | 2 | 17,106 | 15,143 | Free Democratic Party | 8,610 | 1 |
| Schaffhausen | 2 | 17,106 | 15,143 | Party of Farmers, Traders and Independents | 4,625 | 0 |
| Schaffhausen | 2 | 17,106 | 15,143 | Conservative People's Party | 2,484 | 0 |
| Schwyz | 3 | 20,247 | 14,864 | Conservative People's Party | 16,327 | 1 |
| Schwyz | 3 | 20,247 | 14,864 | Free Democratic Party | 10,543 | 1 |
| Schwyz | 3 | 20,247 | 14,864 | Social Democratic Party | 9,343 | 1 |
| Schwyz | 3 | 20,247 | 14,864 | Farmers Association | 7,023 | 0 |
| Solothurn | 7 | 50,575 | 43,737 | Free Democratic Party | 111,749 | 3 |
| Solothurn | 7 | 50,575 | 43,737 | Social Democratic Party | 97,873 | 2 |
| Solothurn | 7 | 50,575 | 43,737 | Conservative People's Party | 79,827 | 2 |
| Solothurn | 7 | 50,575 | 43,737 | Ring of Independents | 5,366 | 0 |
| St. Gallen | 13 | 83,238 | 67,745 | Conservative People's Party | 347,516 | 6 |
| St. Gallen | 13 | 83,238 | 67,745 | Free Democratic Party | 226,468 | 4 |
| St. Gallen | 13 | 83,238 | 67,745 | Social Democratic Party | 141,298 | 2 |
| St. Gallen | 13 | 83,238 | 67,745 | Ring of Independents | 55,692 | 1 |
| St. Gallen | 13 | 83,238 | 67,745 | Young Farmers | 28,337 | 0 |
| St. Gallen | 13 | 83,238 | 67,745 | Social-Political Group | 22,033 | 0 |
| St. Gallen | 13 | 83,238 | 67,745 | Swiss Party of Labour | 12,253 | 0 |
| Ticino | 7 | 49,553 | 33,373 | Conservative People's Party | 92,008 | 3 |
| Ticino | 7 | 49,553 | 33,373 | Free Democratic Party | 88,645 | 3 |
| Ticino | 7 | 49,553 | 33,373 | Social Democratic Party | 37,965 | 1 |
| Ticino | 7 | 49,553 | 33,373 | Ticino Agrarian Popular Group | 6,380 | 0 |
| Ticino | 7 | 49,553 | 33,373 | Party of Farmers, Traders and Independents | 5,330 | 0 |
| Thurgau | 6 | 43,018 | 33,732 | Social Democratic Party | 60,570 | 2 |
| Thurgau | 6 | 43,018 | 33,732 | Party of Farmers, Traders and Independents | 53,563 | 2 |
| Thurgau | 6 | 43,018 | 33,732 | Conservative People's Party | 44,757 | 1 |
| Thurgau | 6 | 43,018 | 33,732 | Free Democratic Party | 37,769 | 1 |
| Uri | 1 | 8,109 | 5,374 | Free Democratic Party | 3,792 | 1 |
| Vaud | 16 | 112,546 | 75,579 | Free Democratic Party | 403,711 | 6 |
| Vaud | 16 | 112,546 | 75,579 | Swiss Party of Labour | 190,143 | 3 |
| Vaud | 16 | 112,546 | 75,579 | Liberal Party | 220,371 | 3 |
| Vaud | 16 | 112,546 | 75,579 | Social Democratic Party | 238,930 | 3 |
| Vaud | 16 | 112,546 | 75,579 | Party of Farmers, Traders and Independents | 114,504 | 1 |
| Valais | 7 | 45,805 | 33,784 | Conservative People's Party | 149,723 | 5 |
| Valais | 7 | 45,805 | 33,784 | Free Democratic Party | 52,444 | 2 |
| Valais | 7 | 45,805 | 33,784 | Social Democratic Party | 25,924 | 0 |
| Valais | 7 | 45,805 | 33,784 | Party of Farmers, Traders and Independents | 4,786 | 0 |
| Zug | 2 | 11,441 | 8,600 | Conservative People's Party | 7,218 | 1 |
| Zug | 2 | 11,441 | 8,600 | Free Democratic Party | 4,773 | 1 |
| Zug | 2 | 11,441 | 8,600 | Social Democratic Party | 4,462 | 0 |
| Zürich | 31 | 230,706 | 174,303 | Social Democratic Party | 1,453,451 | 9 |
| Zürich | 31 | 230,706 | 174,303 | Ring of Independents | 1,000,174 | 6 |
| Zürich | 31 | 230,706 | 174,303 | Party of Farmers, Traders and Independents | 745,034 | 4 |
| Zürich | 31 | 230,706 | 174,303 | Free Democratic Party | 660,271 | 4 |
| Zürich | 31 | 230,706 | 174,303 | Conservative People's Party | 473,479 | 3 |
| Zürich | 31 | 230,706 | 174,303 | Social-Political Group | 338,332 | 2 |
| Zürich | 31 | 230,706 | 174,303 | Swiss Party of Labour | 321,617 | 1 |
| Zürich | 31 | 230,706 | 174,303 | Evangelical People's Party | 179,549 | 1 |
| Zürich | 31 | 230,706 | 174,303 | Liberal Socialist Party | 143,301 | 1 |
Source: Bundesblatt, 27 November 1947

=== Council of the States ===
In several cantons the members of the Council of the States were chosen by the cantonal parliaments.

| Party | Seats | +/– |
|---|---|---|
| Swiss Conservative People's Party | 18 | –1 |
| Free Democratic Party | 11 | –1 |
| Social Democratic Party | 5 | 0 |
| Party of Farmers, Traders and Independents | 4 | 0 |
| Social-Political Group | 2 | 0 |
| Liberal Democratic Party | 2 | 0 |
| Other parties | 2 | +2 |
| Total | 44 | 0 |
Source: Nohlen & Stöver
