= 1963 Swiss federal election =

Federal elections were held in Switzerland on 27 October 1963. The Social Democratic Party emerged as the largest party in the National Council, winning 53 of the 200 seats.

== Results ==
=== National Council ===
Party	Votes	%	Seats	+/–
Social Democratic Party	256,063	26.62	53	+2
Free Democratic Party	230,200	23.94	51	0
Conservative Christian Social Party	225,160	23.41	48	+1
Party of Farmers, Traders and Independents	109,202	11.35	22	–1
Alliance of Independents	48,224	5.01	10	0
Liberal Democratic Union	21,501	2.24	6	+1
Swiss Party of Labour	21,088	2.19	4	+1
Social-Political Group	16,978	1.77	4	0
Evangelical People's Party	15,690	1.63	2	0
Other parties	17,643	1.83	0	–
Total	961,749	100.00	200	+4
Valid votes	961,749	97.44		
Invalid/blank votes	25,248	2.56		
Total votes	986,997	100.00		
Registered voters/turnout	1,493,026	66.11		
Source: Nohlen & Stöver

==== By constituency ====
Constituency	Seats	Electorate	Turnout	Party	Votes	Seats won
Aargau	13	98,595	81,249	Social Democratic Party	312,603	4
Aargau	13	98,595	81,249	Conservative People's Party	230,646	3
Aargau	13	98,595	81,249	Free Democratic Party	196,631	3
Aargau	13	98,595	81,249	Party of Farmers, Traders and Independents	144,763	2
Aargau	13	98,595	81,249	Ring of Independents	55,165	1
Aargau	13	98,595	81,249	Evangelical People's Party	28,002	0
Aargau	13	98,595	81,249	Free Eligible Voters	26,879	0
Aargau	13	98,595	81,249	Non-Partisan List of Evangelical Christian Citizens	11,089	0
Appenzell Ausserrhoden	2	Elected unopposed		Free Democratic Party		1
Appenzell Ausserrhoden	2	Elected unopposed		Social Democratic Party		1
Appenzell Innerrhoden	1	3,705	1,203	Conservative Christian Social Party	897	1
Basel-Landschaft	5	42,790	25,426	Social Democratic Party	43,291	2
Basel-Landschaft	5	42,790	25,426	Free Democratic Party	29,718	1
Basel-Landschaft	5	42,790	25,426	Party of Farmers, Traders and Independents	19,239	1
Basel-Landschaft	5	42,790	25,426	Conservative Christian Social Party	18,323	1
Basel-Landschaft	5	42,790	25,426	Aktion Kanton Basel	14,814	0
Basel-Stadt	8	67,406	40,457	Social Democratic Party	102,355	3
Basel-Stadt	8	67,406	40,457	Free Democratic Party	79,944	2
Basel-Stadt	8	67,406	40,457	Conservative Christian Social Party	41,864	1
Basel-Stadt	8	67,406	40,457	Liberal Party	37,572	1
Basel-Stadt	8	67,406	40,457	Ring of Independents	35,872	1
Basel-Stadt	8	67,406	40,457	Party of Labour	21,724	0
Bern	33	261,817	168,222	Social Democratic Party	1,954,709	12
Bern	33	261,817	168,222	Party of Farmers, Traders and Independents	1,746,618	11
Bern	33	261,817	168,222	Free Democratic Party	953,006	6
Bern	33	261,817	168,222	Conservative Christian Social Party	358,829	2
Bern	33	261,817	168,222	Ring of Independents	215,635	2
Bern	33	261,817	168,222	Evangelical People's Party	105,517	0
Bern	33	261,817	168,222	Non-Partisan List of Evangelical Christian Citizens	81,335	0
Fribourg	6	47,259	31,588	Conservative Christian Social Party	101,174	3
Fribourg	6	47,259	31,588	Free Democratic Party	42,696	2
Fribourg	6	47,259	31,588	Social Democratic Party	24,108	1
Fribourg	6	47,259	31,588	Party of Farmers, Traders and Independents	18,897	0
Geneva	10	71,064	31,340	Social Democratic Party	76,363	2
Geneva	10	71,064	31,340	Free Democratic Party	61,622	2
Geneva	10	71,064	31,340	Party of Labour	58,130	2
Geneva	10	71,064	31,340	Liberal Party	51,990	2
Geneva	10	71,064	31,340	Conservative Christian Social Party	48,249	2
Geneva	10	71,064	31,340	Movement for Economic and Social Democracy	10,673	0
Glarus	2	Elected unopposed		Social Democratic Party		1
Glarus	2	Elected unopposed		Free Democratic Party		1
Grisons	5	38,865	27,605	Conservative Christian Social Party	55,869	2
Grisons	5	38,865	27,605	Social-Political Group	39,508	2
Grisons	5	38,865	27,605	Free Democratic Party	20,723	1
Grisons	5	38,865	27,605	Social Democratic Party	18,219	0
Lucerne	9	72,436	60,804	Conservative Christian Social Party	269,439	5
Lucerne	9	72,436	60,804	Free Democratic Party	196,834	3
Lucerne	9	72,436	60,804	Social Democratic Party	49,397	1
Lucerne	9	72,436	60,804	Ring of Independents	27,511	0
Neuchâtel	5	41,830	18,992	Social Democratic Party	36,354	2
Neuchâtel	5	41,830	18,992	Free Democratic Party	24,256	2
Neuchâtel	5	41,830	18,992	Liberal Party	20,735	1
Neuchâtel	5	41,830	18,992	Party of Labour	11,752	0
Nidwalden	1	6,123	2,673	Conservative Christian Social Party	2,070	1
Obwalden	1	6,437	3,716	Conservative Christian Social Party	2,351	1
Obwalden	1	6,437	3,716	Liberal Party	1,256	0
Schaffhausen	2	18,034	15,727	Social Democratic Party	13,120	1
Schaffhausen	2	18,034	15,727	Free Democratic Party	12,488	1
Schaffhausen	2	18,034	15,727	Ring of Independents	3,398	0
Schwyz	3	22,023	16,214	Conservative Christian Social Party	23,482	2
Schwyz	3	22,023	16,214	Social Democratic Party	13,721	1
Schwyz	3	22,023	16,214	Free Democratic Party	10,286	0
Solothurn	7	56,117	47,859	Free Democratic Party	136,130	3
Solothurn	7	56,117	47,859	Social Democratic Party	109,551	2
Solothurn	7	56,117	47,859	Conservative Christian Social Party	80,155	2
St. Gallen	13	89,306	66,320	Conservative Christian Social Party	387,078	6
St. Gallen	13	89,306	66,320	Free Democratic Party	223,957	4
St. Gallen	13	89,306	66,320	Social Democratic Party	148,540	2
St. Gallen	13	89,306	66,320	Ring of Independents	55,893	1
Ticino	7	53,710	36,719	Free Democratic Party	102,610	3
Ticino	7	53,710	36,719	Conservative Christian Social Party	92,683	3
Ticino	7	53,710	36,719	Social Democratic Party	47,837	1
Ticino	7	53,710	36,719	Party of Farmers, Traders and Independents	8,483	0
Thurgau	6	43,802	32,047	Social Democratic Party	52,964	2
Thurgau	6	43,802	32,047	Conservative Christian Social Party	50,272	1
Thurgau	6	43,802	32,047	Party of Farmers, Traders and Independents	46,689	2
Thurgau	6	43,802	32,047	Free Democratic Party	37,409	1
Uri	1	8,894	5,662	Free Democratic Party	4,216	1
Vaud	16	121,832	52,307	Free Democratic Party	262,659	6
Vaud	16	121,832	52,307	Social Democratic Party	230,205	4
Vaud	16	121,832	52,307	Liberal Party	119,342	2
Vaud	16	121,832	52,307	Party of Labour	101,271	2
Vaud	16	121,832	52,307	Party of Farmers, Traders and Independents	66,096	1
Vaud	16	121,832	52,307	Conservative Christian Social Party	44,872	1
Valais	7	51,557	36,878	Conservative Christian Social Party	163,699	5
Valais	7	51,557	36,878	Free Democratic Party	52,697	1
Valais	7	51,557	36,878	Social Democratic Party	38,745	1
Zug	2	Elected unopposed		Conservative Christian Social Party		1
Zug	2	Elected unopposed		Free Democratic Party		1
Zürich	35	269,670	183,995	Social Democratic Party	1,731,988	10
Zürich	35	269,670	183,995	Free Democratic Party	1,031,813	6
Zürich	35	269,670	183,995	Party of Farmers, Traders and Independents	876,007	5
Zürich	35	269,670	183,995	Ring of Independents	836,710	5
Zürich	35	269,670	183,995	Conservative Christian Social Party	794,359	5
Zürich	35	269,670	183,995	Evangelical People's Party	361,942	2
Zürich	35	269,670	183,995	Social-Political Group	317,701	2
Zürich	35	269,670	183,995	Party of Labour	135,780	0
Zürich	35	269,670	183,995	Swiss Popular Movement Against Foreign Infiltration	111,629	0
Zürich	35	269,670	183,995	Non-Partisan List of Evangelical Christian Citizens	76,452	0
Zürich	35	269,670	183,995	List for Cleanliness in Politics	44,069	0
Zürich	35	269,670	183,995	Non-Partisan Union	23,148	0
Zürich	35	269,670	183,995	New Gotthard Ring	7,632	0
Zürich	35	269,670	183,995	Swiss People's Party	4,536	0
Source: Bundesblatt, 28 November 1963

=== Council of the States ===
In several cantons the members of the Council of the States were chosen by the cantonal parliaments.

Party	Seats	+/–
Conservative Christian Social Party	18	+1
Free Democratic Party	13	0
Party of Farmers, Traders and Independents	4	+1
Social Democratic Party	3	–1
Liberal Democratic Union	3	0
Social-Political Group	3	+2
Alliance of Independents	0	0
Total	44	0
Source: Nohlen & Stöver
