= 1955 Swiss federal election =

Federal elections were held in Switzerland on 30 October 1955. The Social Democratic Party emerged as the largest party in the National Council, winning 53 of the 196 seats.

== Results ==
=== National Council ===
Party	Votes	%	Seats	+/–
Social Democratic Party	263,664	27.02	53	+4
Free Democratic Party	227,370	23.30	50	–1
Conservative People's Party	226,122	23.17	47	–1
Party of Farmers, Traders and Independents	117,847	12.08	22	–1
Alliance of Independents	53,450	5.48	10	0
Swiss Party of Labour	25,060	2.57	4	–1
Liberal Democratic Party	21,688	2.22	5	0
Social-Political Group	21,003	2.15	4	0
Evangelical People's Party	10,581	1.08	1	0
Liberal Socialist Party	3,471	0.36	0	0
Other parties	5,639	0.58	0	–
Total	975,895	100.00	196	0
Valid votes	975,895	97.70		
Invalid/blank votes	22,986	2.30		
Total votes	998,881	100.00		
Registered voters/turnout	1,425,421	70.08		
Source: Nohlen & Stöver

==== By constituency ====
Constituency	Seats	Electorate	Turnout	Party	Votes	Seats won
Aargau	13	92,716	79,494	Social Democratic Party	342,179	4
Aargau	13	92,716	79,494	Conservative People's Party	227,473	3
Aargau	13	92,716	79,494	Free Democratic Party	189,783	3
Aargau	13	92,716	79,494	Party of Farmers, Traders and Independents	144,306	2
Aargau	13	92,716	79,494	Ring of Independents	64,706	1
Aargau	13	92,716	79,494	Evangelical People's Party	22,046	0
Appenzell Ausserrhoden	2	13,846	9,573	Free Democratic Party	10,521	1
Appenzell Ausserrhoden	2	13,846	9,573	Social Democratic Party	6,908	1
Appenzell Innerrhoden	1	3,693	1,382	Conservative People's Party	1,021	1
Basel-Landschaft	4	36,031	22,924	Social Democratic Party	31,784	2
Basel-Landschaft	4	36,031	22,924	Free Democratic Party	20,306	1
Basel-Landschaft	4	36,031	22,924	Conservative People's Party	12,698	1
Basel-Landschaft	4	36,031	22,924	Party of Farmers, Traders and Independents	12,004	0
Basel-Landschaft	4	36,031	22,924	Aktion Kanton Basel	9,174	0
Basel-Landschaft	4	36,031	22,924	Social-Political Group	4,214	0
Basel-Stadt	8	65,204	40,286	Social Democratic Party	94,158	2
Basel-Stadt	8	65,204	40,286	Free Democratic Party	55,383	2
Basel-Stadt	8	65,204	40,286	Ring of Independents	42,400	1
Basel-Stadt	8	65,204	40,286	Conservative People's Party	40,151	1
Basel-Stadt	8	65,204	40,286	Liberal Party	39,650	1
Basel-Stadt	8	65,204	40,286	Swiss Party of Labour	37,551	1
Basel-Stadt	8	65,204	40,286	Party of Farmers, Traders and Independents	9,465	0
Bern	33	251,860	175,839	Social Democratic Party	2,139,790	13
Bern	33	251,860	175,839	Party of Farmers, Traders and Independents	1,926,450	11
Bern	33	251,860	175,839	Free Democratic Party	969,940	6
Bern	33	251,860	175,839	Conservative People's Party	380,782	2
Bern	33	251,860	175,839	Ring of Independents	276,477	1
Fribourg	7	45,708	32,404	Conservative People's Party	120,357	4
Fribourg	7	45,708	32,404	Free Democratic Party	44,577	1
Fribourg	7	45,708	32,404	Party of Farmers, Traders and Independents	33,511	1
Fribourg	7	45,708	32,404	Social Democratic Party	25,367	1
Geneva	8	64,007	27,411	Free Democratic Party	60,675	3
Geneva	8	64,007	27,411	Conservative People's Party	39,689	2
Geneva	8	64,007	27,411	Swiss Party of Labour	35,914	1
Geneva	8	64,007	27,411	Liberal Party	34,672	1
Geneva	8	64,007	27,411	Social Democratic Party	29,212	1
Geneva	8	64,007	27,411	Progressive Party	15,603	0
Geneva	8	64,007	27,411	Federal Independent Union	1,220	0
Glarus	2	Elected unopposed		Social Democratic Party		1
Glarus	2	Elected unopposed		Free Democratic Party		1
Grisons	6	37,310	28,582	Conservative People's Party	68,933	3
Grisons	6	37,310	28,582	Social-Political Group	49,521	2
Grisons	6	37,310	28,582	Free Democratic Party	26,737	1
Grisons	6	37,310	28,582	Social Democratic Party	22,211	0
Lucerne	9	68,085	59,728	Conservative People's Party	267,386	5
Lucerne	9	68,085	59,728	Free Democratic Party	199,663	3
Lucerne	9	68,085	59,728	Social Democratic Party	57,559	1
Lucerne	9	68,085	59,728	Party of Farmers, Traders and Workers	4,337	0
Neuchâtel	5	41,554	23,645	Social Democratic Party	49,081	2
Neuchâtel	5	41,554	23,645	Free Democratic Party	29,316	2
Neuchâtel	5	41,554	23,645	Liberal Party	24,855	1
Neuchâtel	5	41,554	23,645	Swiss Party of Labour	11,883	0
Nidwalden	1	5,750	4,227	Conservative People's Party	2,443	1
Nidwalden	1	5,750	4,227	Liberal Party	1,575	0
Obwalden	1	6,152	2,869	Conservative People's Party	2,295	1
Obwalden	1	6,152	2,869	Liberal Party	460	0
Schaffhausen	2	Elected unopposed		Free Democratic Party		1
Schaffhausen	2	Elected unopposed		Social Democratic Party		1
Schwyz	3	21,061	15,444	Free Democratic Party	12,422	1
Schwyz	3	21,061	15,444	Social Democratic Party	11,914	1
Schwyz	3	21,061	15,444	Conservative People's Party	20,633	1
Solothurn	7	54,322	46,091	Free Democratic Party	137,160	3
Solothurn	7	54,322	46,091	Social Democratic Party	97,418	2
Solothurn	7	54,322	46,091	Conservative People's Party	81,351	2
St. Gallen	13	87,287	68,900	Conservative People's Party	396,220	6
St. Gallen	13	87,287	68,900	Free Democratic Party	240,523	4
St. Gallen	13	87,287	68,900	Social Democratic Party	161,816	2
St. Gallen	13	87,287	68,900	Ring of Independents	64,881	1
Ticino	7	49,672	34,434	Free Democratic Party	100,801	3
Ticino	7	49,672	34,434	Conservative People's Party	90,825	3
Ticino	7	49,672	34,434	Social Democratic Party	44,902	1
Thurgau	6	43,508	32,295	Social Democratic Party	57,100	2
Thurgau	6	43,508	32,295	Party of Farmers, Traders and Independents	49,664	2
Thurgau	6	43,508	32,295	Free Democratic Party	35,040	1
Thurgau	6	43,508	32,295	Conservative People's Party	46,954	1
Uri	1	8,406	4,674	Free Democratic Party	3,617	1
Vaud	16	116,409	58,557	Free Democratic Party	290,599	6
Vaud	16	116,409	58,557	Social Democratic Party	272,071	5
Vaud	16	116,409	58,557	Liberal Party	118,818	2
Vaud	16	116,409	58,557	Swiss Party of Labour	104,634	2
Vaud	16	116,409	58,557	Party of Farmers, Traders and Independents	87,376	1
Vaud	16	116,409	58,557	Conservative People's Party	46,062	0
Valais	7	48,156	36,051	Conservative People's Party	156,400	5
Valais	7	48,156	36,051	Free Democratic Party	48,833	1
Valais	7	48,156	36,051	Social Democratic Party	31,301	1
Valais	7	48,156	36,051	Independent Social Movement	13,441	0
Zug	2	12,559	8,969	Conservative People's Party	7,627	1
Zug	2	12,559	8,969	Free Democratic Party	5,558	1
Zug	2	12,559	8,969	Social Democratic Party	4,096	0
Zürich	32	252,499	185,233	Social Democratic Party	1,675,804	10
Zürich	32	252,499	185,233	Ring of Independents	953,812	6
Zürich	32	252,499	185,233	Party of Farmers, Traders and Independents	821,364	5
Zürich	32	252,499	185,233	Free Democratic Party	771,305	4
Zürich	32	252,499	185,233	Conservative People's Party	668,038	4
Zürich	32	252,499	185,233	Social-Political Group	374,423	2
Zürich	32	252,499	185,233	Swiss Party of Labour	160,419	0
Zürich	32	252,499	185,233	Evangelical People's Party	284,414	0
Zürich	32	252,499	185,233	Liberal Socialist Party	111,064	0
Source: Bundesblatt, 1 December 1955

=== Council of the States ===
In several cantons the members of the Council of the States were chosen by the cantonal parliaments.

Party	Seats	+/–
Swiss Conservative People's Party	17	–1
Free Democratic Party	12	0
Social Democratic Party	5	+1
Party of Farmers, Traders and Independents	3	0
Liberal Democratic Party	3	0
Social-Political Group	2	0
Other parties	2	0
Total	44	0
Source: Nohlen & Stöver
