= Liberal Party of Switzerland =

Liberal Party of Switzerland German: Liberale Partei der Schweiz French: Parti libéral suisse Italian: Partito Liberale Svizzero Romansh: Partida liberala svizra
- Founded: 8 October 1913; 113 years ago
- Dissolved: 1 January 2009; 17 years ago
- Merged into: FDP.The Liberals
- Headquarters: Spitalgasse 32, Case postale 7107; 3001 Bern
- Ideology: Liberalism (Switzerland); Pro-Europeanism
- Political position: Centre-right
- European affiliation: European Liberal Democrat and Reform Party
- International affiliation: Liberal International
- Colours: Blue

The Liberal Party of Switzerland (German: Liberale Partei der Schweiz) or Swiss Liberal Party (French: Parti libéral suisse; Italian: Partito Liberale Svizzero; Romansh: Partida liberala svizra) was a political party in Switzerland with economically liberal policies. It was known as a party of the upper class. On 1 January 2009 it merged with the larger Free Democratic Party (FDP/PRD) to form FDP.The Liberals.

It was strongest in the Protestant cantons in Romandy, particularly in Geneva, Vaud and Neuchâtel. In contrast, the ideologically similar FDP was successful nationwide. The Liberal Party was a member of Liberal International.

== History ==
Founded in 1913, the Liberal Party initially had sections in Zürich, Schaffhausen, Fribourg, Grisons, and Bern, in addition to Romandy. However, most of its sections were dissolved during the First World War, and by 1919 the party was confined to four cantons (Geneva, Vaud, Neuchâtel and Basel-City). In the 1960s, the Liberal Party tried to expand its influence beyond the four cantons, renaming itself the "Liberal-Democratic Union" from 1961 to 1977 in order to attract members from other regions. Although, since 1976, a Valais section had occupied a small place in the cantonal government, the party performed poorly in Basel-Country, Fribourg, Bern, Zurich. For many years it was the largest party not represented in the Federal Council. Gustave Ador, in office from 1917 to 1919, was the Liberal Party's only federal councilor.

The party formed a parliamentary group with the Evangelical People's Party from 1971 to 1979. After cooperating with moderate elements of the Swiss People's Party since 2000, the Liberal Party had a joint slate with the Free Democratic Party in the 2003 federal election. The party was the junior partner of the faction, with only 2.2% of the vote compared with the FDP's 17.3%. However, in their strongholds of the cantons of Romandy and the canton of Basel-City, they were particularly successful. Their best performance was in Geneva, where they received 16.8% of the vote. It won four seats (out of 200) in the National Council, but was represented in neither the Council of States nor in the Federal Council, the government's cabinet.

After the election, the Liberals and FDP founded a common caucus in the Federal Assembly. In June 2005, they strengthened their cooperation by founding the Radical and Liberal Union. They finally merged on 1 January 2009 with the Free Democratic Party of Switzerland to form the "FDP.The Liberals".

== Positions ==
The Liberal Party was committed to federalism and anti-statism, emphasizing individual responsibility. While it was in favor of support for agriculture, the party believed that regional planning should not interfere with municipal autonomy or private property. Its supporters were mainly drawn from the agricultural sector (especially winegrowers), industrial entrepreneurs, and the intelligentsia. The party's leaders often came from the Zofingen student society and were close to employers' organisations. Historically, it also had a strong Protestant influence.

The Liberal Party often adopted different positions from other upper-class political parties: it did not support the creation of old-age and survivors insurance, and was the only party to oppose the establishment of the Swiss National Day in 1993. While it campaigned against Switzerland's accession to the United Nations in a 1986 referendum, the party was pro-European, supporting a federal resolution on the European Economic Area in a 1992 referendum and the opening of negotiations for European Community (and later European Union) membership.

== Electoral performance ==
From 1919 to 1987, the number of Federal Assembly seats held by the Liberal Party varied between five and ten in the National Council and between one and three in the Council of States. The party then experienced a period of favorable conditions before suffering a series of setbacks. Its representation at the Federal Assembly fell from thirteen to four seats between 1991 and 2003.

=== National Council ===
| Election year | % of overall vote | # of seats won | +/- |
|---|---|---|---|
| 1919 | 3,8 | 9 / 189 | new |
| 1922 | 4,0 | 10 / 198 | ▲1 |
| 1925 | 3,0 | 7 / 198 | ▼3 |
| 1928 | 3,0 | 6 / 198 | ▼1 |
| 1931 | 2,8 | 6 / 187 | Steady |
| 1935 | 3,3 | 6 / 187 | Steady |
| 1939 | 1,7 | 6 / 187 | Steady |
| 1943 | 3,2 | 8 / 194 | ▲2 |
| 1947 | 3,2 | 7 / 194 | ▼1 |
| 1951 | 2,6 | 5 / 196 | ▼2 |
| 1955 | 2,2 | 5 / 196 | Steady |
| 1959 | 2,3 | 5 / 196 | Steady |
| 1963 | 2,2 | 6 / 200 | ▲1 |
| 1967 | 2,3 | 6 / 200 | Steady |
| 1971 | 2,2 | 6 / 200 | Steady |
| 1975 | 2,4 | 6 / 200 | Steady |
| 1979 | 2,8 | 8 / 200 | ▲2 |
| 1983 | 2,8 | 8 / 200 | Steady |
| 1987 | 2,7 | 9 / 200 | ▲1 |
| 1991 | 3,0 | 10 / 200 | ▲1 |
| 1995 | 2,7 | 7 / 200 | ▼3 |
| 1999 | 2,3 | 6 / 200 | ▼1 |
| 2003 | 2,2 | 4 / 200 | ▼2 |
| 2007 | 1,9 | 4 / 200 | Steady |
Source: Federal Statistical Office

== Presidents ==
- 1981–1985 Lukas Burckhardt, Basel
- 1985–1989 Gilbert Coutau, Geneva
- 1989–1993 Claude Bonnard, Vaud
- 1993–1997 François Jeanneret, Vaud
- 1997–2002 Jacques-Simon Eggly, Geneva
- 2002–2008 Claude Ruey, Vaud
- 2008–2009 Pierre Weiss, Geneva

== See also ==
- Liberalism and radicalism in Switzerland
