= List of judges of the Federal Supreme Court of Switzerland =

This is a list of judges of the Federal Supreme Court of Switzerland.

== Current judges ==
=== First public law division ===
Name	Term of office	Party	Notes
Michel Féraud		FDP/PRD	Division president
Heinz Aemisegger		CVP/PDC	
Arthur Aeschlimann		FDP/PRD	President of the Supreme Court, 2007
Bertrand Reeb		LPS/PLS	
Jean Fonjallaz		SPS/PSS	
Ivo Eusebio		SVP/UDC	

=== Second public law division ===
Name	Term of office	Party	Notes
Thomas Merkli		GPS/PES	Division president
Adrian Hungerbühler		FDP/PRD	
Alain Wurzburger		FDP/PRD	
Robert Müller		CVP/PDC	
Danielle Yersin		SVP/UDC	
Peter Karlen		SVP/UDC	

=== First civil law division ===
Name	Term of office	Party	Notes
Bernard Corboz		FDP/PRD	Division president
Kathrin Klett		SPS/PSS	
Vera Rottenberg Liatowitsch		SPS/PSS	
Gilbert Kolly		CVP/PDC	
Christina Kiss		FDP/PRD	

=== Second civil law division ===
Name	Term of office	Party	Notes
Niccolò Raselli		SPS/PSS	Division president
Ursula Nordmann-Zimmermann		SPS/PSS	
Elisabeth Escher		CVP/PDC	
Lorenz Meyer		SVP/UDC	
Fabienne Hohl		FDP/PRD	
Luca Marazzi		FDP/PRD	

=== Criminal law division ===
Name	Term of office	Party	Notes
Roland Schneider		SVP/UDC	Division president
Hans Wiprächtiger		SPS/PSS	
Pierre Ferrari		FDP/PRD	
Dominique Favre		SPS/PSS	
Andreas Zünd		SPS/PSS	
Hans Mathys		SVP/UDC	

=== First social law division ===
Name	Term of office	Party	Notes
Rudolf Ursprung		SVP/UDC	Division president
Ursula Widmer-Schmid		FDP/PRD	
Franz Schön		CVP/PDC	
Susanne Leuzinger-Naef		SPS/PSS	Vice president of the Supreme Court, 2007
Jean-Maurice Frésard		SPS/PSS	

=== Second social law division ===
Name	Term of office	Party	Notes
Ulrich Meyer		SVP/UDC	Division president
Alois Lustenberger		CVP/PDC	
Aldo Borella		FDP/PRD	
Yves Kernen		SVP/UDC	
Hansjörg Seiler		SVP/UDC	

== Former judges ==
Name	From	To	Division	Canton	Party	Birth	Death
Franz Kaspar Zenruffinen	1848	1861		VS		1803	1861
Paul Migy	1848	1852		JU		1814	1879
Johann Conrad Kern	1848	1854		TG		1808	1888
Karl Johann Brenner	1848	1851		BS	FDP	1814	1883
Louis-Eugène Favre	1848	1851		NE	FDP	1816	1861
Johann Rudolf Brosi	1848	1857		GR	FDP	1801	1877
Kasimir Pfyffer	1848	1863		LU	LPS	1794	1875
Franz Jauch	1848	1852		UR	LPS	1807	1867
Johann Jakob Rüttimann	1848	1854		ZH		1813	1876
Johann Jakob Blumer	1848	1875		GL	LPS	1819	1875
Jean Folly	1848	1853		FR		1787	1867
Jean-Jaques Castoldi	1851	1857		GE	FDP	1804	1871
Johann Jakob Trog	1851	1856		SO		1807	1867
Jakob Stämpfli	1851	1854		BE		1820	1879
Johann Karl Kappeler	1851	1857		TG		1816	1888
Nicolas Glasson	1853	1864		FR		1817	1864
Nicolaus Hermann	1853	1874		OW		1818	1888
Eduard Eugen Blösch	1854	1866		BE	CVP	1807	1866
Gottlieb Jäger	1856	1874		AG	FDP	1805	1891
Joseph Wilhelm Viktor Vigier	1857	1874		SO	FDP	1823	1886
Arnold Otto Aepli	1857	1866		SG	LPS	1816	1897
Philippe Camperio	1857	1874		GE	LPS	1810	1882
Henri (Joseph) Ducrey	1862	1864		VS	FDP	1805	1864
K. Eduard Häberlin	1862	1872		TG		1820	1884
Jost Weber	1863	1872		LU	LPS	1823	1889
Alexis Allet	1864	1872		VS	FDP	1820	1888
Victor Ruffy	1864	1867		VD		1823	1868
Carl Georg Jakob Sailer	1866	1870		SG		1817	1870
Edouard Carlin	1866	1870		JU	FDP	1817	1870
Paul Ceresole	1867	1870		VD	LPS	1832	1905
Eugène Borel	1870	1872		NE	FDP	1835	1892
Josef Karl Pankraz Morel	1870	1900		SG	FDP	1825	1900
Josef Bühler	1872	1873		LU	LPS	1837	1873
Johann Messmer	1872	1874	C	TG		1818	1880
Heinrich (sr) Honegger	1872	1874		ZH	LPS	1832	1889
Jules Roguin	1873	1890		VD	LPS	1823	1908
Rudolf Niggeler	1874	1879		BE	FDP	1845	1887
Josef Bläsi	1874	1903		SO	FDP	1833	1903
Gustave Pictet	1874	1876		GE	DEM	1827	1900
Gaudenzio (Andrea) Olgiati	1874	1892		GR		1836	1892
Fridolin Anderwert	1874	1875		TG	DEM	1828	1880
Johann Conrad Weber	1875	1908	C, Cs, CC	AG	FDP	1839	1918
Heinrich Stamm	1875	1905	Cs, CC	SH	DEM	1827	1905
Jakob Dubs	1875	1879		ZH	KKP	1822	1879
Jean Broye	1876	1899	Cs	FR	FDP	1828	1899
Heinrich Hafner	1879	1902	C, CC	ZH		1838	1902
Alois Kopp	1879	1891		LU	KKP	1827	1891
Charles-Henri Soldan	1890	1900	C	VD	FDP	1855	1900
Felix Clausen	1891	1916	Cs	VS	KKP	1834	1916
Agostino Soldati	1892	1936	2C	TI	KKP	1857	1938
Auguste (Georges Adrien) Cornaz	1893	1896	Cs, CC	NE	FDP	1834	1896
Emil Rott	1893	1905	C, CC	BE	FDP	1852	1905
Karl Attenhofer	1893	1906	C	LU	KKP	1836	1906
Andrea Bezzola	1893	1897	Cs	GR	FDP	1840	1897
Johannes Winkler	1893	1903	C, Cs, CC	LU	LPS	1845	1918
Hermann Lienhard	1895	1905	C, Cs	BE	FDP	1851	1905
Frédéric Auguste Monnier	1896	1921	Cs	NE	FDP	1847	1931
Jakob Huldreich Bachmann	1896	1904	C	TG	LPS	1843	1915
Leo Weber	1897	1901	Cs	SO	FDP	1841	1935
Emile Perrier	1899	1924	Cs	FR	KKP	1848	1924
Georges Favey	1900	1919	C, 1C, CC	VD	LPS	1847	1919
Carl Jäger	1900	1937	C, Cs, 2C	SG		1869	1947
Heinrich Honegger	1901	1936	1C, 2C, CC	ZH	LPS	1862	1940
Albert Ursprung	1902	1935	C, 1C, 2C	AG		1862	1935
Viktor Merz	1903	1934	Cs, C	BE	FDP	1865	1940
Fritz Ostertag	1903	1926	C, 2C	BS		1868	1948
Franz Schmid	1904	1923	C, Cs, 1C	UR	KKP	1841	1923
Albert Affolter	1904	1930	CsA, 1C	SO	FDP	1856	1932
Emil Schurter	1904	1921	Cs	ZH	KKP	1864	1921
Rudolf Gallati	1904	1904	Cs	GL	FDP	1845	1904
Ernest Picot	1904	1921	C, Cs, 1C, CC	GE	FDP	1853	1921
Alfred Stooss	1905	1925	C, CC, 1C, 2C	BE	FDP	1860	1925
Alexander Reichel	1905	1920	C, Cs	BE	SPS	1853	1921
Adam Hans Gysin	1905	1909	Cs	BL		1852	1909
Vincent Gottofrey	1906	1919	Cs, C, CC	FR	KKP	1862	1919
Theodor Weiss	1908	1936	1C, CC	ZH		1868	1936
Emil Kirchhofer	1909	1942	Cs, 1C	SH		1871	1944
Hans Müri	1912	1933	CsA	AG	FDP	1861	1944
Henri Thelin	1912	1934	1C, 2C, CC	VD	FDP	1867	1963
Victor Hauser	1912	1924	2C	ZH	FDP	1867	1924
Virgile Rossel	1912	1932	2C, CC	BE	FDP	1858	1933
Hugo Oser	1912	1930	1C, 2C	BL		1863	1930
Arthur (Joseph-Marie) Couchepin	1916	1936	Cs, CC	VS	FDP	1869	1941
Eugène Deschenaux	1919	1922	1C	FR	KKP	1874	1940
Paul Rambert	1919	1932	1C, 2C	VD	LPS	1866	1932
Karl Zgraggen	1920	1929	CsA, CC	UR		1861	1929
Robert Fazy	1921	1942	Cs, CC, 1C	GE	LPS	1872	1956
Josef Jakob Strebel	1921	1954	1C, 2C	AG	KKP	1887	1965
Léon Robert	1921	1942	1C, CC	NE	FDP	1873	1944
Evaristo Garbani-Nerini	1922	1925	1C	TI	FDP	1867	1944
Karl Adolf Brodtbeck	1924	1932	2C	BL	SPS	1866	1932
Johann Engeler	1924	1936	1C, CC	SG	KKP	1864	1949
Hans Steiner	1924	1951	CsA	SZ	KKP	1884	1964
Georg Leuch	1925	1954	1C	BE	SVP	1888	1959
Plinio Bolla	1925	1950	1C, 2C	TI	FDP	1896	1963
Joseph Piller	1926	1933	Cs, 2C	FR	KKP	1890	1954
Jakob Hablützel	1928	1950	2C	ZH	BGB	1885	1959
Eugen Blocher	1928	1952	CsA	BS	SPS	1882	1964
Camille Guggenheim	1929	1930	Cs	AG	SPS	1894	1930
Hans Affolter	1930	1936	Cs	SO	SPS	1870	1936
Adrian von Arx	1930	1934	CsA	SO	FDP	1879	1934
Josef Andermatt	1930	1942	1C	ZG	KKP	1871	1942
Hartmann Friedrich Studer	1932	1942	2C	ZH	SPS	1873	1945
Jean Rossel	1932	1942	2C	BE	FDP	1884	1944
Robert Guex	1932	1948	2C	VD	LPS	1881	1948
Walter Nägeli	1933	1952	Cs	ZH	FDP	1881	1965
Louis Python	1933	1963	CsA	FR	KKP	1893	1992
Hans Huber	1934	1946	Cs, CC	TG	FDP	1901	1987
Paul Kasser	1934	1945		BE		1876	1945
Robert Petitmermet	1935	1956	CsA, 2C, CC	VD	FDP	1886	1976
August Ernst	1936	1950	2C	AG		1880	1959
Louis Couchepin	1936	1952	1C	VS	FDP	1896	1952
Wilhelm Stauffer	1936	1959	1C	BE	SVP	1893	1986
Eugen Hasler	1936	1950	1C	ZH		1884	1965
Walter Leuenberger	1937	1953	1C	BE	SPS	1885	1964
Wilhelm Schönenberger	1937	1964	1C	SG	KKP	1898	1985
Carlo Pometta	1937	1966	1C, 2C	TI	KKP	1896	1979
Adolf Ziegler	1938	1960	2C, CC	SO	FDP	1890	1985
Franz Fässler	1942	1969	1C, CC	AI	KKP	1899	1986
Paul Logoz	1942	1953	CC	GE		1888	1973
Eduard Arnold	1943	1962	CC, CsA	LU	SPS	1895	1977
Albert Comment	1943	1964	CsA, 2C	BE	FDP	1894	1987
Fritz Häberlin	1943	1969	CsA	TG	FDP	1899	1970
Albert Constant François Rais	1943	1956	1C, CC	NE	FDP	1888	1973
Kurt Rudolf Düby	1946	1951	CsA	ZH	SPS	1900	1951
Theodor Abrecht	1946	1964	CsA	BE	SPS	1894	1983
André Panchaud	1948	1970	CsA, 1C	VD	LPS	1901	1976
Fernando Pedrini	1950	1962	CC	TI	FDP	1898	1984
Gustav Muheim	1951	1967	CC	UR	KKP	1897	1979
Hans Tschopp	1951	1974	CC, 1C	ZH	SPS	1903	1990
Paul Corrodi	1951	1963	2C, 1C	ZH	SVP	1892	1964
Paul Schwartz	1951	1972	2C, CC	BS	FDP	1905	1977
Silvio Giovanoli	1951	1972	1C, 2C	GR	FDP	1902	1981
Antoine Favre	1952	1967	CsA	VS	KKP	1897	1974
Fritz Bachtler	1953	1962	CC	SO	SPS	1892	1971
Otto Deggeler	1953	1967	CsA	ZH	FDP	1897	1981
Werner Stocker	1953	1964	2C	AG	SPS	1904	1964
René Perrin	1953	1973	CC	NE	SPS	1910	1997
Karl Dannegger	1954	1962	1C	BE	SVP	1895	1980
Joseph Plattner	1955	1965	2C	GR	KKP	1902	1965
Pierre Cavin	1957	1979	1C, 2C	VD	FDP	1909	1992
André Grisel	1957	1978	CC, 2C, CsA	NE	FDP	1911	1990
Emil Schmid	1959	1974	2C, 1C	BE	SVP	1908	1992
Kurt Schoch	1961	1969	CC, CsA, 2C	SH	FDP	1904	1980
Paul Lemp	1963	1978	CC, 1C	BE	BGB	1908	2001
Werner Dubach	1963	1976	CC, CsA	BE	SPS	1905	1985
Eduard Jöhr	1963	1976	CC	AG	SVP	1906	1991
Harald Huber	1963	1981	CsA, 2C, CC	ZH	SPS	1912	1998
Rolando Forni	1963	1994	2C	TI	FDP	1925
Jakob Heusser	1964	1965	2C	ZH	SPS	1901	1965
Jean Castella	1964	1985	2C, 1C	FR	CVP	1920	1995
Jean-Pierre Rüedi	1965	1982	1C	BE	SPS	1916	1998
Paul Reichlin	1965	1972	CsA	SZ	CVP	1902	1990
Jean-Pierre Châtelain	1965	1981	1C	BE	FDP	1916	1995
Otto Konstantin Kaufmann	1966	1984	2P	SG	CVP	1914	1999
Walter Kämpfer	1966	1980	2C, 2P	BE	SPS	1914	1998
Fulvio Antognini	1967	1996	1P	TI	CVP	1926	2001
Erhard Schweri	1968	1988	2C, CC	ZH	CVP	1922
Arthur Haefliger	1968	1986	1P	SO	FDP	1919	2011
Henri Fragnière	1968	1982	1P	VS	CVP	1915	1993
Adolf Lüchinger	1969	1992	2C	ZH	SPS	1928
Alexandre Berenstein	1970	1979	1P	GE	SPS	1909	2000
Hans Dubs	1970	1986	1P, CC	AG	FDP	1923	2005
Raphael von Werra	1970	1987	CC	VS	CVP	1926
Max Stoffel	1970	1981	1C	TG	CVP	1911	2002
Henri Zwahlen	1970	1974	1P	VD	LPS	1911	1974
Rudolf Matter	1973	1986	1P	SH	FDP	1916
Vital Schwander	1973	1980	CC	SZ	CVP	1913	2005
Rolf Raschein	1973	1992	1C, 2C	GR	FDP	1929	1994
Jean-Jaques Leu	1974	2001	CC, 1C	VD	SPS	1933
Georg Messmer	1975	1987	1C	ZH	SVP	1921	1987
Margrith Bigler-Eggenberg	1975	1994	2C	SG	SPS	1933
Robert Patry	1975	1992	2P	GE	LPS	1923
Robert Levi	1976	1987	1P	ZH	SPS	1921	2002
Edwin Weyermann	1976	2000	CC, 1C, 2C	BE	SVP	1932
Carl Hans Brunschwiler	1979	1993	2P	AG	CVP	1927
Jean-François Egli	1979	1996	2P, 1C, 1P	NE	FDP	1928
Alfred Kuttler	1979	1993	1P	BS	FDP	1923
André Florian Imer	1979	1993	2P	BE	SVP	1928
Philippe Daniel Junod	1980	1992	CC, 2C	VD	FDP	1928	1995
Albert Allemann-Reichle	1980	1990	2P, CC	SO	SPS	1923	2003
Claude Bernard Rouiller	1980	1996	1P	VS	SPS	1941
Paul Moritz	1981	1990	CC	BE	FDP	1923
Herman Innozenz Schmidt	1981	1995	2P, 1P	BS	SPS	1930
Alois Pfister	1981	1986	2P	SZ	CVP	1921
Georges Scyboz	1982	1996	1P, 2C	FR	CVP	1927	2002
Heinz Hausheer	1982	1990	2C	ZG	CVP	1937
Martin Schubarth	1983	2004	1C, CC	BS	SPS	1942
Peter Alexander Müller	1985	1998	2P, CC	VS	CVP	1940
Louis Bourgknecht	1985	1998	1P, 1C	FR	CVP	1931
Karl Hartmann	1986	2001	2P	UR	CVP	1936
Thomas Pfisterer	1986	1991	1C, 1P	AG	FDP	1941
Heinrich Weibel	1987	1999	1P, 1C, 2C	BL	FDP	1932
Hans Peter Walter	1987	2004	1C	BE	FDP	1944
Karl Spühler	1987	1995	1P, 2C	ZH	SVP	1935
Giusep Nay	1988	2006	1P	GR	CVP	1942
Gerold Betschart	1990	2006	2P	SZ	CVP	1941
Franz Nyffeler	1995	2006	1C	AG	SVP	1941
Sergio Bianchi	1995	2002	2C	TI	FDP	1948
Oliver Jacot-Guillarmod	1996	2001	1P	NE	FDP	1950	2001
Emilio Catenazzi	1997	2003	1P	TI	CVP	1938

This table uses the following abbreviations:

- Party: German-language abbreviation of the name of the party nominating that judge; see Political parties of Switzerland
- Canton: Standard codes for the cantons of Switzerland
- Division:
  - 1C, 2C, C: (First or second) civil law division
  - 1P, 2P: First or second public law division
  - CC: Court of Cassation
  - Cs: Constitutional law division
  - CsA: Constitutional and administrative law division

== See also ==
- List of presidents of the Federal Supreme Court of Switzerland
