= 1851 Swiss federal election =

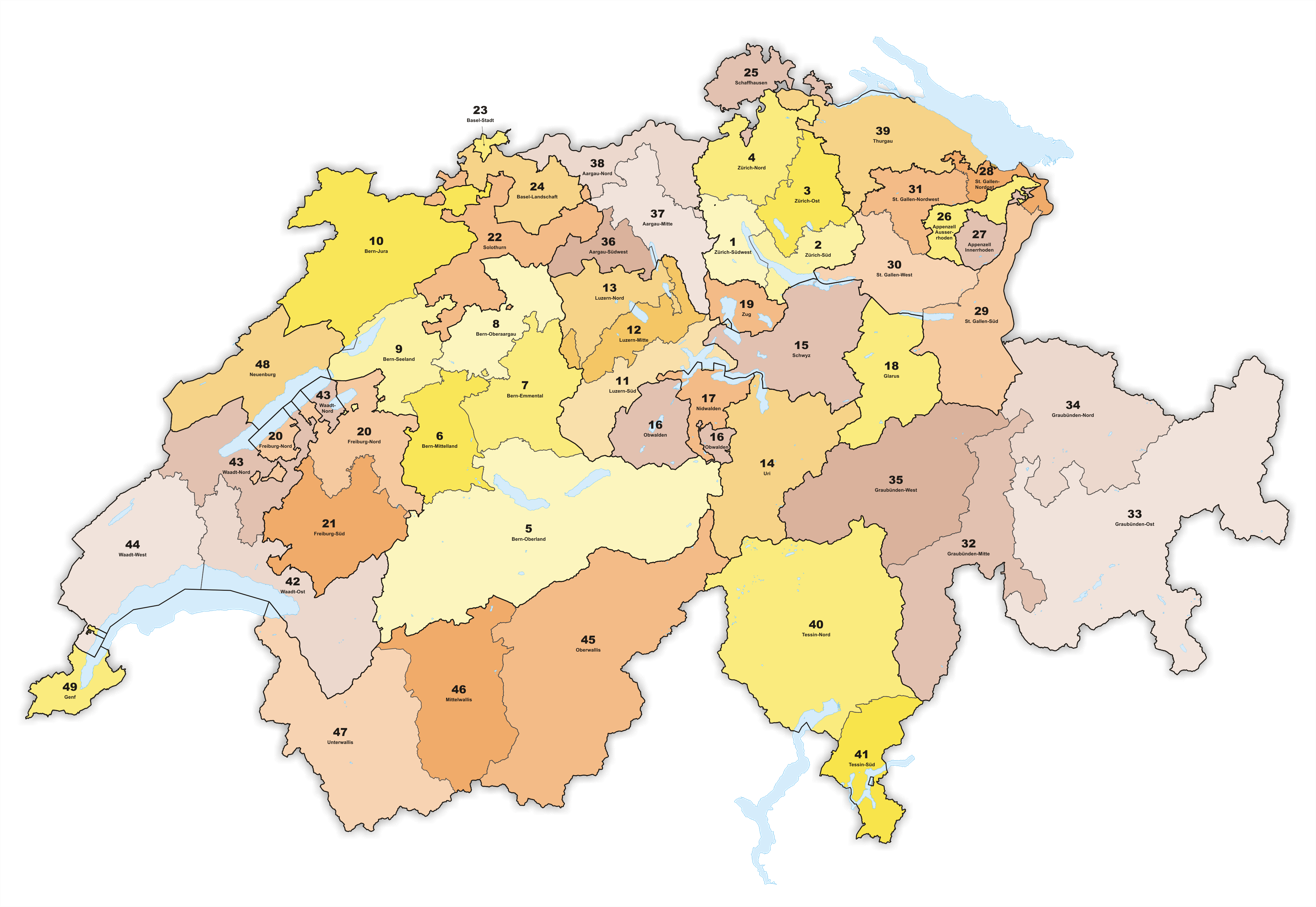
The 49 electoral districts

Federal elections were held in Switzerland on 26 October 1851. The Radical Left remained the largest group in the National Council, winning 78 of the 120 seats.

== Electoral system ==
The elections were held under the Federal law concerning the elections to the National Council, which had been passed on 21 December 1850. The 120 members of the National Council were elected in 49 single- and multi-member constituencies; there was one seat for every 20,000 citizens, with seats allocated to cantons in proportion to their population. The 1850 law reduced the number of constituencies from 52, but increased the number of seats from 111; Aargau, Glarus, Lucerne, Neuchâtel, Vaud and Zürich gained one seat each, whilst Bern gained three seats. The law also set the election date as the last Sunday in October and introduced a three-year term.

The elections were held using a three-round system; candidates had to receive a majority in the first or second round to be elected; if it went to a third round, only a plurality was required. Voters could cast as many votes as there were seats in their constituency. In six cantons (Appenzell Innerrhoden, Appenzell Ausserrhoden, Glarus, Nidwalden, Obwalden and Uri), National Council members were elected by the Landsgemeinde.

== Results ==
=== National Council ===
Party	Votes	%	Seats	+/–
Radical Left		53.1	78	–1
Catholic Right		15.5	16	+6
Liberal Centre		13.6	16	+5
Evangelical Right		13.5	7	+2
Democratic Left		4.1	3	–3
Independents		0.2	0	New
Total			120	+9
Total votes	276,997	–		
Registered voters/turnout	517,020	53.58		
Source: BFS

==== By constituency ====
Constituency	Seats	Party	Seats won	Elected members
Zürich 1	4	Radical Left	4	Jonas Furrer; Alfred Escher; Jakob Dubs; Georg Joseph Sidler
Zürich 2	3	Radical Left	3	Hermann Stadtmann; Benjamin Brändli; Karl Adolf Huber
Zürich 3	3	Radical Left	3	Rudolf Wäffler; Hans Heinrich Zangger; Heinrich Rüegg
Zürich 4	3	Radical Left	2	Rudolf Benz; Johann Jakob Ryffel
Zürich 4	3	Evangelical Right	1	Paul Carl Eduard Ziegler
Bern 5	4	Radical Left	4	Albert Lohner; Jakob Karlen; Albrecht Weyermann; Jakob Imobersteg
Bern 6	4	Evangelical Right	3	Eduard Blösch; Friedrich Fueter; Bendicht Straub
Bern 6	4	Liberal Centre	1	Ulrich Ochsenbein
Bern 7	4	Radical Left	4	Johann Ulrich Lehmann; Johann Ulrich Gfeller; Johannes Bach; Karl Karrer
Bern 8	4	Radical Left	4	Johann Bützberger; Johann Rudolf Vogel; Johann Rudolf Schneider; Johannes Hubler
Bern 9	3	Radical Left	3	Jakob Stämpfli; Johann August Weingart; Xavier Stockmar
Bern 10	4	Catholic Right	3	Charles Moreau; Xavier Elsässer; Pierre-Ignace Aubry
Bern 10	4	Evangelical Right	1	Auguste Moschard
Lucerne 11	2	Radical Left	1	Jakob Robert Steiger
Lucerne 11	2	Liberal Centre	1	Jakob Kopp
Lucerne 12	2	Catholic Right	2	Philipp Anton von Segesser; Alois Kopp
Lucerne 13	3	Radical Left	3	Josef Sigmund Bühler; Casimir Pfyffer; Anton Schnyder
Uri 14	1	Catholic Right	1	Florian Lusser
Schwyz 15	2	Liberal Centre	1	Franz Karl Schuler
Schwyz 15	2	Catholic Right	1	Johann Anton Steinegger
Obwalden 16	1	Catholic Right	1	Franz Wirz
Nidwalden 17	1	Catholic Right	1	Franz Durrer
Glarus 18	2	Radical Left	1	Caspar Jenny
Glarus 18	2	Liberal Centre	1	Johannes Trümpy
Zug 19	1	Catholic Right	1	Silvan Schwerzmann
Fribourg 20	3	Radical Left	3	Nicolas Glasson; Julien Schaller; Henri-Benjamin Presset
Fribourg 21	2	Radical Left	2	J.-F.-M. Bussard; Léon Pittet
Solothurn 22	3	Radical Left	3	Johann Jakob Trog; Josef Munzinger; Niklaus Pfluger
Basel-Stadt 23	1	Liberal Centre	1	Achilles Bischoff
Basel-Landschaft 24	2	Radical Left	1	Stephan Gutzwiller
Basel-Landschaft 24	2	Democratic Left	1	Johannes Mesmer
Schaffhausen 25	2	Radical Left	2	Friedrich Peyer im Hof; Johann Georg Fuog
Appenzell Ausserrhoden 26	2	Radical Left	2	Johann Jakob Sutter; Johann Heinrich Tanner
Appenzell Innerhoden 27	1	Catholic Right	1	Johann Nepomuk Hautle
St. Gallen 28	2	Radical Left	2	Joseph Marzell Hoffmann; Wilhelm Matthias Naeff
St. Gallen 29	2	Radical Left	2	Christian Rohrer; Josef Leonhard Bernold
St. Gallen 30	2	Radical Left	2	Abraham Raschle; Benedikt Schubiger
St. Gallen 31	2	Liberal Centre	1	Johann Georg Anderegg
St. Gallen 31	2	Radical Left	1	Johann Matthias Hungerbühler
Grisons 32	1	Evangelical Right	1	Johann Baptista Bavier
Grisons 33	1	Liberal Centre	1	Andreas Rudolf von Planta
Grisons 34	1	Radical Left	1	Georg Michel
Grisons 35	1	Liberal Centre	1	Johann Bartholome Arpagaus
Aargau 36	3	Radical Left	2	Friedrich Frey-Herosé; Samuel Friedrich Siegfried
Aargau 36	3	Liberal Centre	1	Adolf Fischer
Aargau 37	4	Radical Left	3	Johann Peter Bruggisser; Samuel Schwarz; Franz Waller
Aargau 37	4	Liberal Centre	1	Friedrich Schmid
Aargau 38	3	Catholic Right	3	Udalrich Schaufelbühl; Gregor Lützelschwab; Karl Ludwig Baldinger
Thurgau 39	4	Radical Left	4	Johann Konrad Kern; Johann Georg Kreis; Eduard Häberlin; Johann Ludwig Sulzberger
Ticino 40	3	Radical Left	3	Agostino Demarchi; Benigno Soldini; Giacomo Luvini
Ticino 41	3	Radical Left	2	Giovanni Battista Pioda; Stefano Franscini
Ticino 41	3	Liberal Centre	1	Rocco Bonzanigo
Vaud 42	4	Liberal Centre	2	Édouard Dapples; Auguste de Loës
Vaud 42	4	Radical Left	2	Louis Wenger; Louis Blanchenay
Vaud 43	3	Radical Left	2	Henri Druey; Justin Bornand
Vaud 43	3	Liberal Centre	1	Emmanuel-D. Bourgeois
Vaud 44	3	Liberal Centre	1	Charles Bontems
Vaud 44	3	Radical Left	1	Vincent Kehrwand
Vaud 44	3	Democratic Left	1	François Thury
Valais 45	1	Catholic Right	1	Alexis Allet
Valais 46	1	Catholic Right	1	Antoine de Riedmatten
Valais 47	2	Radical Left	2	Maurice Barman; Adrien-Félix Pottier
Neuchâtel 48	4	Radical Left	4	Fritz Courvoisier; Frédéric Lambelet; Hugues Thomas; Auguste Rougemont
Geneva 49	3	Radical Left	3	Philippe Camperio; Abraham Louis Tourte; Alexandre-Félix Alméras
Source: Gruner

=== Council of States ===
Party	Seats	+/–
Radical Left	17	–13
Liberal Centre	14	+6
Catholic Right	10	+4
Evangelical Right	2	+2
Democratic Left	0	0
Independents	1	New
Total	44	0
Source: Federal Assembly
