= 1854 Swiss federal election =

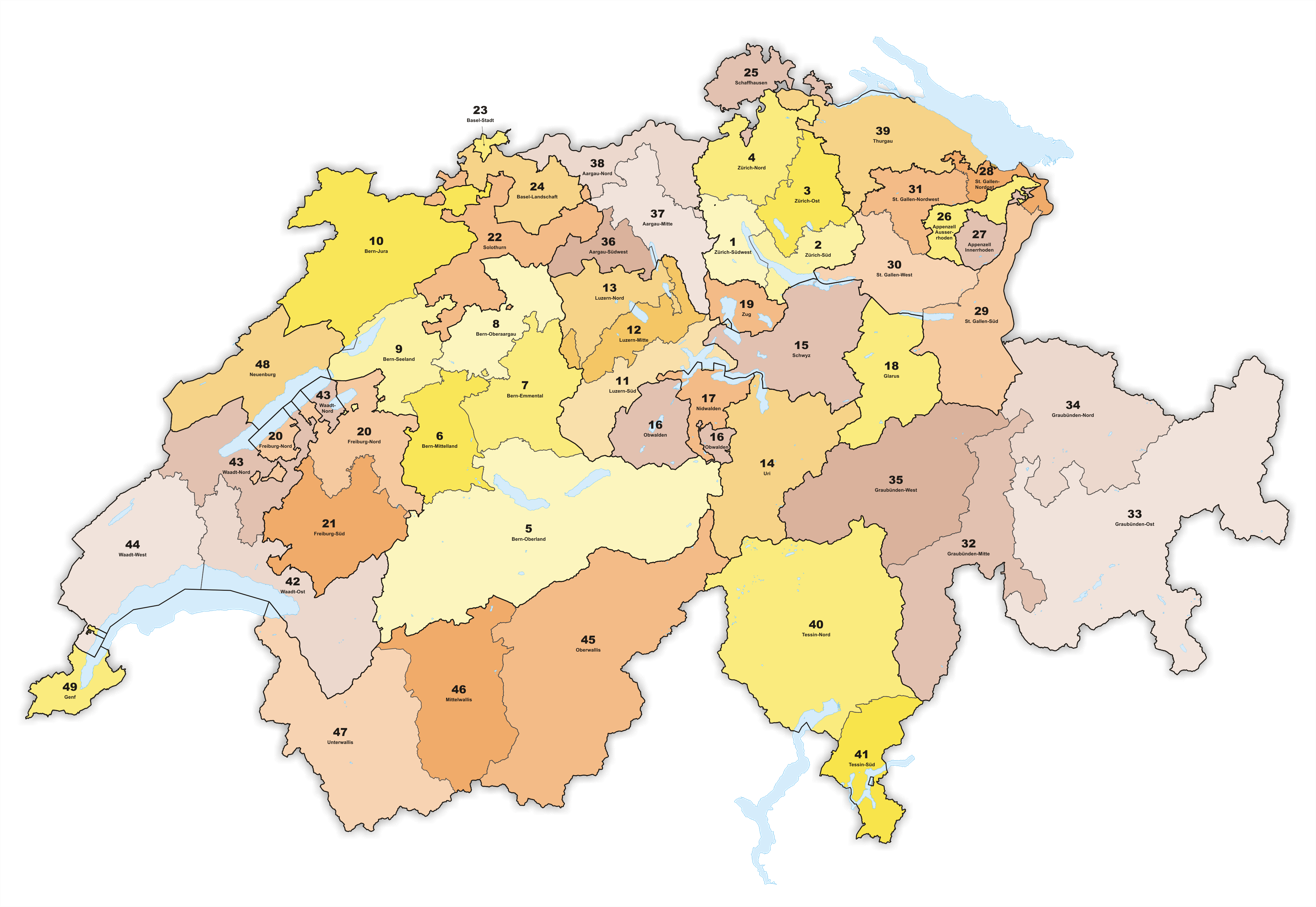
The 49 electoral districts

Federal elections were held in Switzerland on 29 October 1854. The Radical Left remained the largest group in the National Council, winning 80 of the 120 seats.

== Electoral system ==
The 120 members of the National Council were elected in 49 single- and multi-member constituencies; there was one seat for every 20,000 citizens, with seats allocated to cantons in proportion to their population. The elections were held using a three-round system; candidates had to receive a majority in the first or second round to be elected; if it went to a third round, only a plurality was required. Voters could cast as many votes as there were seats in their constituency. In six cantons (Appenzell Innerrhoden, Appenzell Ausserrhoden, Glarus, Nidwalden, Obwalden and Uri), National Council members were elected by the Landsgemeinde.

== Results ==
=== National Council ===
Party	Votes	%	Seats	+/–
Radical Left		59.5	80	+2
Liberal Centre		15.8	16	0
Catholic Right		14.3	14	–2
Evangelical Right		7.4	6	–1
Democratic Left		1.6	2	–1
Dissidents		1.4	2	New
Total			120	0
Total votes	236,760	–		
Registered voters/turnout	517,641	45.74		
Source: BFS, Gruner

==== By constituency ====
Constituency	Seats	Party	Seats won	Elected members
Zürich 1	4	Radical Left	3	Alfred Escher; Georg Joseph Sidler; Heinrich Hüni
Zürich 1	4	Democratic Left	1	Johann Jakob Treichler
Zürich 2	3	Radical Left	3	Jonas Furrer; Karl Adolf Huber; Hermann Stadtmann
Zürich 3	3	Radical Left	3	Rudolf Wäffler; Hans Heinrich Zangger; Heinrich Rüegg
Zürich 4	3	Radical Left	2	Rudolf Benz; Johann Jakob Ryffel
Zürich 4	3	Evangelical Right	1	Paul Carl Eduard Ziegler
Bern 5	4	Radical Left	4	Jakob Karlen; Albrecht Weyermann; Samuel Friedrich Moser; Jakob Imobersteg
Bern 6	4	Evangelical Right	3	Friedrich Fueter; Eduard Blösch; August von Gonzenbach
Bern 6	4	Liberal Centre	1	Christoph Albert Kurz
Bern 7	4	Radical Left	3	Johann Ulrich Gfeller; Karl Karrer; Johannes Bach
Bern 7	4	Evangelical Right	1	Gottlieb Rudolf Bühlmann
Bern 8	4	Radical Left	4	Johann Bützberger; Johann Rudolf Vogel; Johannes Hubler; Jakob Steiner
Bern 9	3	Radical Left	3	Jakob Stämpfli; Johann Rudolf Schneider; Johann August Weingart
Bern 10	4	Radical Left	4	Paul Migy; Édouard Carlin; Cyprien Revel; Xavier Stockmar
Lucerne 11	2	Radical Left	1	Josef Bucher
Lucerne 11	2	Liberal Centre	1	Josef Martin Knüsel
Lucerne 12	2	Catholic Right	2	Philipp Anton von Segesser; Alois Kopp
Lucerne 13	3	Radical Left	3	Casimir Pfyffer; Josef Sigmund Bühler; Anton Schnyder
Uri 14	1	Catholic Right	1	Florian Lusser
Schwyz 15	2	Catholic Right	1	Karl Styger
Schwyz 15	2	Radical Left	1	Jakob Meinrad Hegner
Obwalden 16	1	Catholic Right	1	Franz Wirz
Nidwalden 17	1	Catholic Right	1	Melchior Wyrsch
Glarus 18	2	Radical Left	2	Caspar Jenny; Johannes Trümpy
Zug 19	1	Catholic Right	1	Konrad Bossard
Fribourg 20	3	Liberal Centre	2	J. F. L. Engelhard; François-Xavier Bondallaz
Fribourg 20	3	Catholic Right	1	Alfred Vonderweid
Fribourg 21	2	Catholic Right	2	Louis de Wuilleret; Hubert Charles
Solothurn 22	3	Liberal Centre	2	Simon Lack; Johann Jakob Trog
Solothurn 22	3	Radical Left	1	Josef Munzinger
Basel-Stadt 23	1	Liberal Centre	1	Johann Jakob Stehlin
Basel-Landschaft 24	2	Radical Left	2	Johann Bussinger; Stephan Gutzwiller
Schaffhausen 25	2	Radical Left	1	Johann Georg Fuog
Schaffhausen 25	2	Liberal Centre	1	Stefano Franscini
Appenzell Ausserrhoden 26	2	Independent	1	Jakob Kellenberger
Appenzell Ausserrhoden 26	2	Radical Left	1	Titus Tobler
Appenzell Innerhoden 27	1	Catholic Right	1	Johann Nepomuk Hautle
St. Gallen 28	2	Radical Left	2	Joseph Marzell Hoffmann; Wilhelm Matthias Naeff
St. Gallen 29	2	Radical Left	2	Josef Leonhard Bernold; Christian Rohrer
St. Gallen 30	2	Radical Left	2	Abraham Raschle; Benedikt Schubiger
St. Gallen 31	2	Radical Left	1	Johann Matthias Hungerbühler
St. Gallen 31	2	Liberal Centre	1	Johann Georg Anderegg
Grisons 32	1	Evangelical Right	1	Johann Baptista Bavier
Grisons 33	1	Liberal Centre	1	Andreas Rudolf von Planta
Grisons 34	1	Radical Left	1	Georg Michel
Grisons 35	1	Radical Left	1	Alois de Latour
Aargau 36	3	Radical Left	2	Friedrich Frey-Herosé; Samuel Friedrich Siegfried
Aargau 36	3	Liberal Centre	1	Samuel Frey
Aargau 37	4	Radical Left	3	Johann Peter Bruggisser; Franz Waller; Gottlieb Jäger
Aargau 37	4	Liberal Centre	1	Friedrich Schmid
Aargau 38	3	Catholic Right	2	Udalrich Schaufelbühl; Wilhelm Karl Baldinger
Aargau 38	3	Radical Left	1	Augustin Keller
Thurgau 39	4	Radical Left	4	Eduard Häberlin; Johann Ludwig Sulzberger; Johann Georg Kreis; Johann Baptist von Streng
Ticino 40	3	Catholic Right	3	Leone de Stoppani; Giuseppe Filippo Lepori; Gaetano Luvisoni
Ticino 41	3	Catholic Right	2	Michele Pedrazzini; Ferdinando Cattaneo
Ticino 41	3	Liberal Centre	1	Rocco Bonzanigo
Vaud 42	4	Radical Left	4	Jules Martin; Louis Blanchenay; Frédéric Fonjallaz; Édouard Cherix
Vaud 43	3	Radical Left	2	Charles Estoppey; Henri Druey
Vaud 43	3	Democratic Left	1	Abram-Daniel Meystre
Vaud 44	3	Radical Left	3	Vincent Kehrwand; François Thury; Maurice-Benjamin Bonard
Valais 45	1	Catholic Right	1	Alexis Allet
Valais 46	1	Catholic Right	1	Antoine de Riedmatten
Valais 47	2	Radical Left	2	Adrien-Félix Pottier; Maurice Barman
Neuchâtel 48	4	Radical Left	4	Fritz Courvoisier; Alexis-Marie Piaget; Charles-Jules Matthey; Frédéric Auguste Zuberbühler
Geneva 49	3	Liberal Centre	3	Guillaume Henri Dufour; Philippe Camperio; Jean-Jacques Darier
Source: Gruner

==== Election re-runs ====
Constituency	Seats	Date of re-run	Party	Seats won	Elected members
Ticino 40	3	11 March 1855	Radical Left	3	Giacomo Luvini; Cesare Bernasconi; Giovanni Battista Ramelli
Ticino 41	3	11 March 1855	Radical Left	3	Giovanni Jauch; Giuseppe Patocchi; Giovanni Battista Pioda
Source: Gruner

=== Council of States ===
Party	Seats	+/–
Radical Left	14	–3
Liberal Centre	14	0
Catholic Right	10	0
Democratic Left	1	+1
Evangelical Right	1	–1
Independents	2	+1
Vacant	2	+2
Total	44	0
Source: Federal Assembly
