= 1857 Swiss federal election =

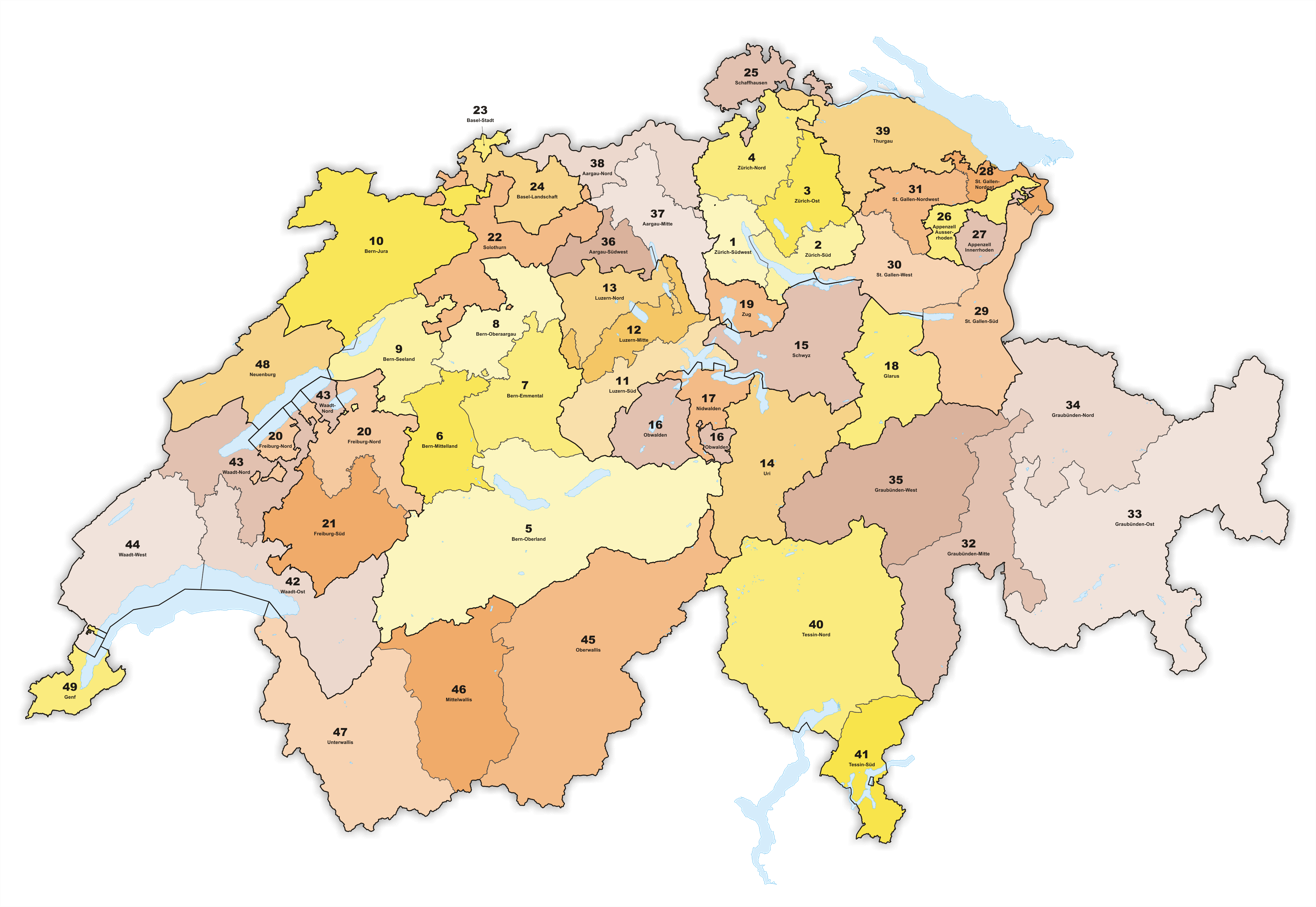
The 49 electoral districts

Federal elections were held in Switzerland on 28 October 1857. The Radical Left remained the largest group in the National Council, winning 80 of the 120 seats.

== Electoral system ==
The 120 members of the National Council were elected in 49 single- and multi-member constituencies; there was one seat for every 20,000 citizens, with seats allocated to cantons in proportion to their population. The elections were held using a three-round system; candidates had to receive a majority in the first or second round to be elected; if it went to a third round, only a plurality was required. Voters could cast as many votes as there were seats in their constituency. In six cantons (Appenzell Innerrhoden, Appenzell Ausserrhoden, Glarus, Nidwalden, Obwalden and Uri), National Council members were elected by the Landsgemeinde.

Compulsory voting was introduced in the Canton of Schaffhausen for the elections, with the canton seeing the highest turnout at 86.4% compared to the 46.5% figure nationally.

== Results ==
=== National Council ===
Party	Votes	%	Seats	+/–
Radical Left		60.4	80	0
Catholic Right		16.8	20	+6
Liberal Centre		15.9	15	–1
Evangelical Right		4.3	5	–1
Democratic Left		2.0	0	–2
Independents		0.6	0	0
Total			120	0
Total votes	244,774	–		
Registered voters/turnout	526,693	46.47		
Source: BFS

==== By constituency ====
Constituency	Seats	Party	Seats won	Elected members
Zürich 1	4	Radical Left	4	Alfred Escher; Johann Jakob Treichler; Georg Joseph Sidler; Heinrich Hüni
Zürich 2	3	Radical Left	3	Jonas Furrer; Karl Adolf Huber; Hermann Stadtmann
Zürich 3	3	Radical Left	3	Heinrich Rüegg; Hans Heinrich Zangger; Rudolf Wäffler
Zürich 4	3	Radical Left	3	Rudolf Benz; Ulrich Meister Sr.; Johann Jakob Bucher
Bern 5	4	Radical Left	4	Jakob Imobersteg; Johann Jakob Karlen; Gottlieb Schneider; Karl Engemann
Bern 6	4	Evangelical Right	4	Eduard Blösch; Christoph Albert Kurz; August von Gonzenbach; Gottlieb Ludwig Lauterburg
Bern 7	4	Radical Left	4	Johann Ulrich Gfeller; Karl Karrer; Samuel Lehmann; Rudolf Schmid
Bern 8	4	Radical Left	4	Johann Bützberger; Johann Rudolf Vogel; Jakob Steiner; Johannes Hubler
Bern 9	3	Radical Left	3	Jakob Stämpfli; Johann Rudolf Schneider; Johann August Weingart
Bern 10	4	Radical Left	4	Paul Migy; Édouard Carlin; Cyprien Revel; Xavier Stockmar
Lucerne 11	2	Liberal Centre	1	Josef Martin Knüsel
Lucerne 11	2	Radical Left	1	Josef Bucher
Lucerne 12	2	Catholic Right	2	Philipp Anton von Segesser; Alois Kopp
Lucerne 13	3	Radical Left	3	Casimir Pfyffer; Josef Sigmund Bühler; Anton Schnyder
Uri 14	1	Catholic Right	1	Florian Lusser
Schwyz 15	2	Catholic Right	2	Karl Styger; Josef Anton Georg Büeler
Obwalden 16	1	Catholic Right	1	Franz Wirz
Nidwalden 17	1	Radical Left	1	Melchior Joller
Glarus 18	2	Liberal Centre	2	Joachim Heer; Peter Jenny
Zug 19	1	Catholic Right	1	Konrad Bossard
Fribourg 20	3	Catholic Right	2	François-Xavier Bondallaz; Alfred Vonderweid
Fribourg 20	3	Liberal Centre	1	J. F. L. Engelhard
Fribourg 21	2	Catholic Right	2	Louis de Wuilleret; Hubert Charles
Solothurn 22	3	Radical Left	2	Simon Kaiser; Benedikt von Arx
Solothurn 22	3	Catholic Right	1	Franz Bünzli
Basel-Stadt 23	1	Liberal Centre	1	Johann Jakob Stehlin
Basel-Landschaft 24	2	Radical Left	2	Stephan Gutzwiller; Daniel Bieder
Schaffhausen 25	2	Radical Left	2	Friedrich Peyer im Hof; Johann Georg Fuog
Appenzell Ausserrhoden 26	2	Radical Left	1	Johann Konrad Oertli
Appenzell Ausserrhoden 26	2	Liberal Centre	1	Adolf Friedrich Zürcher
Appenzell Innerhoden 27	1	Catholic Right	1	Josef Anton Fässler
St. Gallen 28	2	Radical Left	2	Wilhelm Matthias Naeff; Joseph Marzell Hoffmann
St. Gallen 29	2	Radical Left	2	Christian Rohrer; Josef Guldin
St. Gallen 30	2	Radical Left	2	Abraham Raschle; Benedikt Schubiger
St. Gallen 31	2	Catholic Right	1	Johann Joseph Müller
St. Gallen 31	2	Radical Left	1	Johann Matthias Hungerbühler
Grisons 32	1	Evangelical Right	1	Johann Andreas Sprecher
Grisons 33	1	Liberal Centre	1	Andreas Rudolf von Planta
Grisons 34	1	Radical Left	1	Georg Michel
Grisons 35	1	Radical Left	1	Caspar de Latour
Aargau 36	3	Liberal Centre	2	Samuel Frey; Carl Feer-Herzog
Aargau 36	3	Radical Left	1	Friedrich Frey-Herosé
Aargau 37	4	Radical Left	2	Johann Peter Bruggisser; Franz Waller
Aargau 37	4	Liberal Centre	2	Johann Rudolf Ringier; Gottlieb Jäger
Aargau 38	3	Radical Left	2	Adolf Hauser; Augustin Keller
Aargau 38	3	Catholic Right	1	Wilhelm Karl Baldinger
Thurgau 39	4	Radical Left	3	Johann Ludwig Sulzberger; Johann Georg Kreis; Johann Messmer
Thurgau 39	4	Liberal Centre	1	Johann Baptist von Streng
Ticino 40	3	Radical Left	3	Cesare Bernasconi; Giacomo Luvini; Giovanni Battista Ramelli
Ticino 41	3	Radical Left	3	Giovanni Battista Pioda; Giovanni Jauch; Giuseppe Patocchi
Vaud 42	4	Radical Left	2	Jules Martin; Louis Blanchenay
Vaud 42	4	Democratic Left	1	Constant Fornerod
Vaud 42	4	Liberal Centre	1	Édouard Dapples
Vaud 43	3	Radical Left	2	Charles Estoppey; Samuel Déglon
Vaud 43	3	Liberal Centre	1	Jean-Louis Demiéville
Vaud 44	3	Radical Left	2	Louis-Henri Delarageaz; Jean-Louis Ancrenaz
Vaud 44	3	Liberal Centre	1	Charles Bontems
Valais 45	1	Catholic Right	1	Alexis Allet
Valais 46	1	Catholic Right	1	Adrien de Courten
Valais 47	2	Catholic Right	2	Antoine Luder; Camille de Werra
Neuchâtel 48	4	Radical Left	4	Alexis-Marie Piaget; Louis Grandpierre; Louis Constant Lambelet; Gustave Irlet
Geneva 49	3	Radical Left	2	James Fazy; Jean-Jacques Challet-Venel
Geneva 49	3	Liberal Centre	1	Philippe Camperio
Source: Gruner

=== Council of States ===
Party	Seats	+/–
Catholic Right	14	+4
Radical Left	13	–1
Liberal Centre	11	–3
Democratic Left	0	–1
Evangelical Right	0	–1
Independents	2	0
Vacant	4	+2
Total	44	0
Source: Federal Assembly
