= 1848 Swiss federal election =

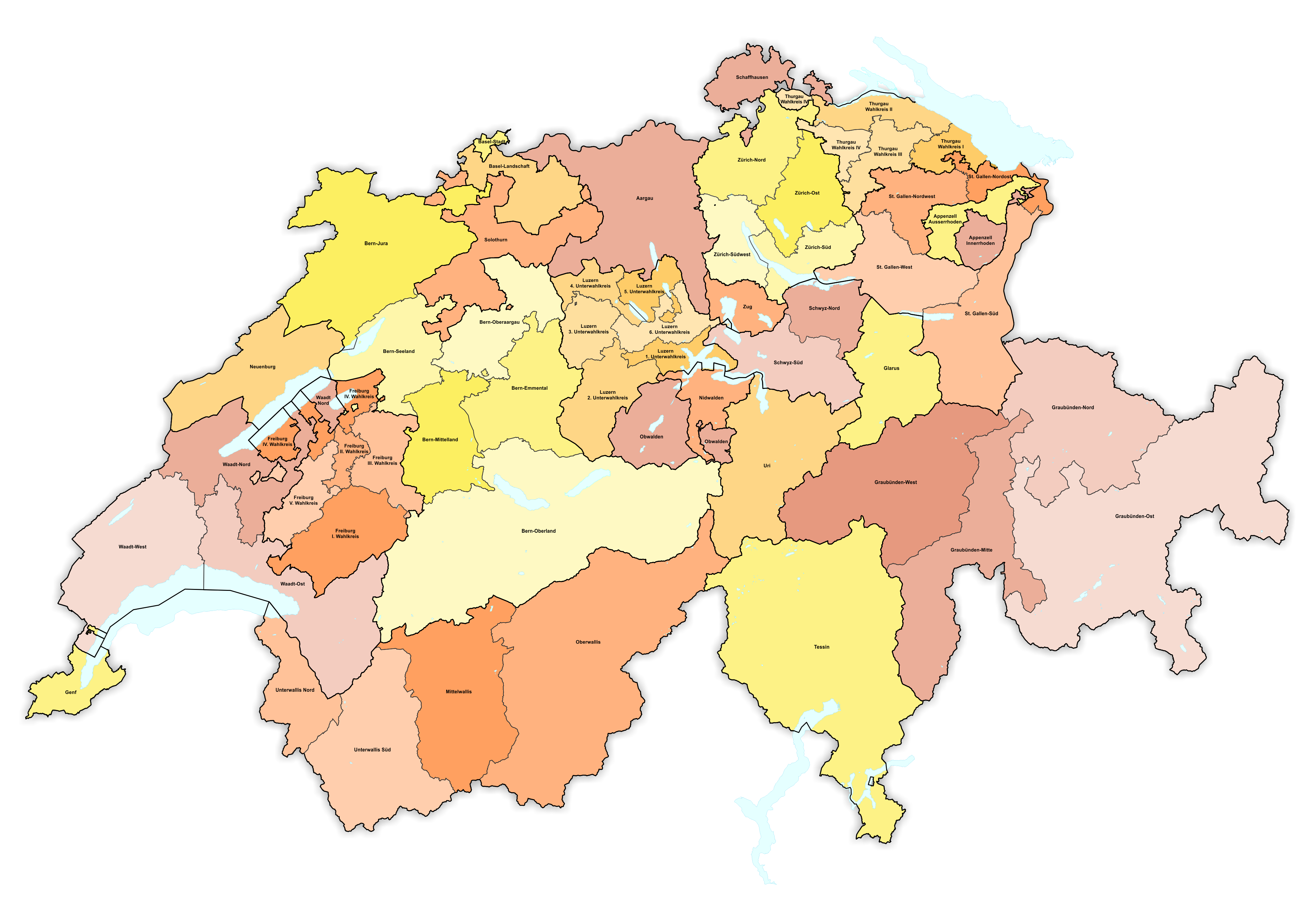
The 52 electoral districts

Federal elections were held in Switzerland between 1 and 27 October 1848. The Radical Left emerged as the largest group, winning 79 of the 111 seats in the National Council.

== Electoral system ==
The 111 members of the National Council were elected from 52 single- and multi-member constituencies. In six cantons (Appenzell Innerrhoden, Appenzell Ausserrhoden, Glarus, Nidwalden, Obwalden and Uri), National Council members were elected by the Landsgemeinde.

== Results ==
=== National Council ===
Party	Votes	%	Seats
Radical Left		58.0	79
Liberal Centre		16.9	11
Catholic Right		11.6	10
Evangelical Right		8.6	5
Democratic Left		4.3	6
Total			111
Total votes	228,877	–	
Registered voters/turnout	512,691	44.64	
Source: BFS

==== By constituency ====
Constituency	Seats	Party	Seats won	Elected members
Aargau	9	Radical Left	8	Friedrich Frey-Herosé; Adolf Fischer; Johann Peter Bruggisser; Karl Rudolf Tanner; Gottlieb Jäger; Johann Ulrich Hanauer; Johann Dössekel; Karl Ferdinand Schimpf
Aargau	9	Liberal Centre	1	Jakob Isler
Appenzell Ausserrhoden	2	Radical Left	2	Johann Heinrich Heim; Johann Jakob Sutter
Appenzell Innerrhoden	1	Catholic Right	1	Johann Nepomuk Hautle
Basel-Landschaft	2	Radical Left	1	Johann Jakob Matt
Basel-Landschaft	2	Democratic Left	1	Emil Remigius Frey
Basel-Stadt	1	Liberal Centre	1	Achilles Bischoff
Bern 5	4	Radical Left	4	Johann Karlen; Albert Lohner; Jakob Imobersteg; Friedrich Seiler
Bern 6	4	Evangelical Right	2	Friedrich Fueter; Johann Anton von Tillier
Bern 6	4	Radical Left	2	Ulrich Ochsenbein; Johann August Weingart
Bern 7	3	Radical Left	2	Alexander Ludwig Funk; Karl Karrer
Bern 7	3	Liberal Centre	1	Johann Schneider
Bern 8	3	Radical Left	3	Johann Rudolf Schneider; Johann Rudolf Vogel; Friedrich Sigmund Kohler
Bern 9	3	Liberal Centre	1	Karl Neuhaus
Bern 9	3	Radical Left	1	Jakob Stämpfli
Bern 9	3	Evangelical Right	1	Guillaume Henri Dufour
Bern 10	3	Radical Left	2	Xavier Stockmar; Cyprien Revel
Bern 10	3	Liberal Centre	1	Xavier Péquignot
Fribourg 1	1	Radical Left	1	Jacques-Joseph Remy
Fribourg 2	1	Radical Left	1	Nicolas Glasson
Fribourg 3	1	Radical Left	1	Christophe Joachim Marro
Fribourg 4	1	Radical Left	1	Jean Folly
Fribourg 5	1	Liberal Centre	1	François-Xavier Badoud
Geneva	3	Radical Left	3	Jean-Jacques Castoldi; Joseph Girard; Alexandre-Félix Alméras
Glarus	1	Radical Left	1	Caspar Jenny
Grisons 1	1	Evangelical Right	1	Johann Baptista Bavier
Grisons 2	1	Radical Left	1	Alois de Latour
Grisons 3	1	Radical Left	2	Georg Michel
Grisons 4	1	Liberal Centre	1	Andreas Rudolf von Planta
Lucerne	6	Radical Left	4	Jakob Robert Steiger; Johann Jakob Heller; Casimir Pfyffer; Anton Schnyder
Lucerne	6	Catholic Right	1	Philipp Anton von Segesser
Lucerne	6	Liberal Centre	1	Jakob Kopp
Neuchâtel	3	Radical Left	3	Frédéric Lambelet; Louis-Eugène Favre; Jules Matthey
Nidwalden	1	Catholic Right	1	Melchior Wyrsch
Obwalden	1	Catholic Right	1	Franz Wirz
Schaffhausen	2	Radical Left	2	Johann Georg Böschenstein; Friedrich Peyer im Hof
Schwyz-North	1	Catholic Right	1	Johann A. Steinegger
Schwyz-South	1	Liberal Centre	1	Franz Karl Schuler
Solothurn	3	Radical Left	3	Johann Jakob Trog; Niklaus Pfluger; Benjamin Brunner
St. Gallen 1	2	Radical Left	2	Joseph Marzell Hoffmann; Franz Eduard Erpf
St. Gallen 2	2	Radical Left	2	Josef Leonhard Bernold; Johann Baptist Weder
St. Gallen 3	2	Radical Left	1	Dominik Gmür
St. Gallen 3	2	Liberal Centre	1	Johann Jakob Steger
St. Gallen 4	2	Radical Left	1	Johann M. Hungerbühler
St. Gallen 4	2	Liberal Centre	1	Johann Georg Anderegg
Thurgau 1	1	Radical Left	1	Johann Georg Kreis
Thurgau 2	1	Radical Left	1	Johann Konrad Kern
Thurgau 3	1	Democratic Left	1	Philipp Gottlieb Labhardt
Thurgau 4	1	Democratic Left	1	Johann Georg Rauch
Ticino	6	Radical Left	6	Stefano Franscini; Giacomo Luvini; Giovanni Battista Pioda; Benigno Soldini; Giovanni Jauch; Carlo Battaglini
Uri	1	Catholic Right	1	Florian Lusser
Valais 1	1	Catholic Right	1	Joseph Anton Clemenz
Valais 2	1	Catholic Right	1	Antoine de Riedmatten
Valais 3	1	Radical Left	1	Maurice Barman
Valais 4	1	Radical Left	1	Adrien-Félix Pottier
Vaud 1	3	Radical Left	2	Louis Blanchenay; François Veillon
Vaud 1	3	Democratic Left	1	Jules Eytel
Vaud 2	3	Radical Left	3	Benjamin Pittet; Charles Vittel; Rodolphe Soutter
Vaud 3	3	Radical Left	2	Louis Blanchenay; François Veillon
Vaud 3	3	Democratic Left	1	Abram-Daniel Meystre
Zug	1	Catholic Right	1	Silvan Schwerzmann
Zürich 1	3	Radical Left	3	Georg Joseph Sidler; Alfred Escher; Johann Jakob Wieland
Zürich 2	3	Radical Left	3	Johannes Wild; Hans Heinrich Hürlimann; Rudolf Bollier
Zürich 3	3	Radical Left	2	Johann Jakob Müller; Heinrich Rüegg
Zürich 3	3	Democratic Left	1	Heinrich Homberger
Zürich 4	3	Radical Left	2	Felix Wiedmann; Rudolf Benz
Zürich 4	3	Evangelical Right	1	Paul Carl Eduard Ziegler
Source: Gruner

=== Council of States ===
Party	Seats
Radical Left	30
Liberal Centre	8
Catholic Right	6
Democratic Left	0
Evangelical Right	0
Total	44
Source: Federal Assembly
