= List of presidents of the Federal Supreme Court of Switzerland =

This is a list of presidents of the Federal Supreme Court of Switzerland. It includes all presiding judges of the Federal Supreme Court of Switzerland since 1848.

Until the Swiss Constitution of 1874, members of the Federal Assembly (Council of States, National Council) could be judges and many of the presidents of the Federal Supreme Court were also members of the Federal Assembly.

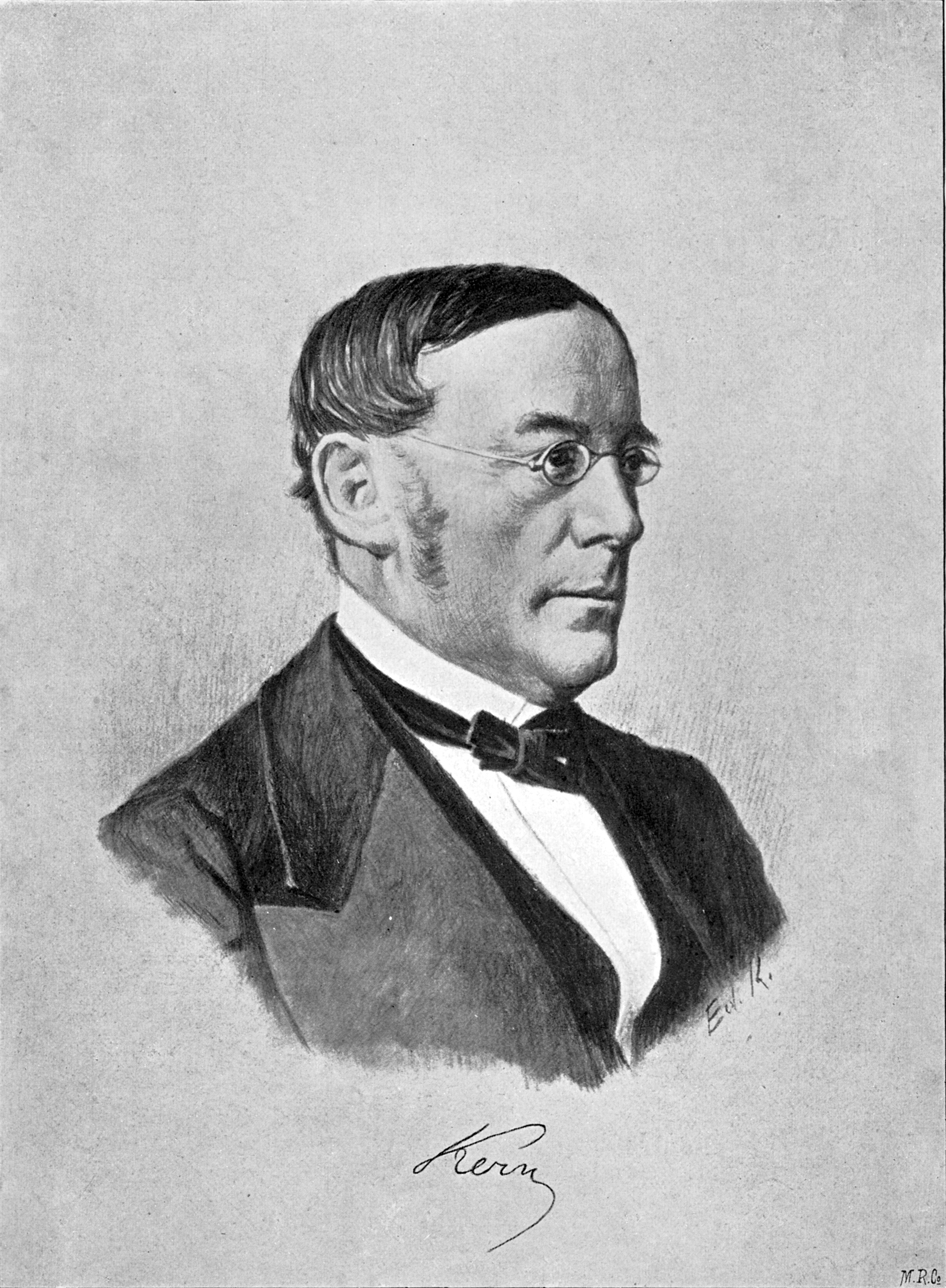
Johann Konrad Kern was the first President of the Federal Supreme Court (1848)

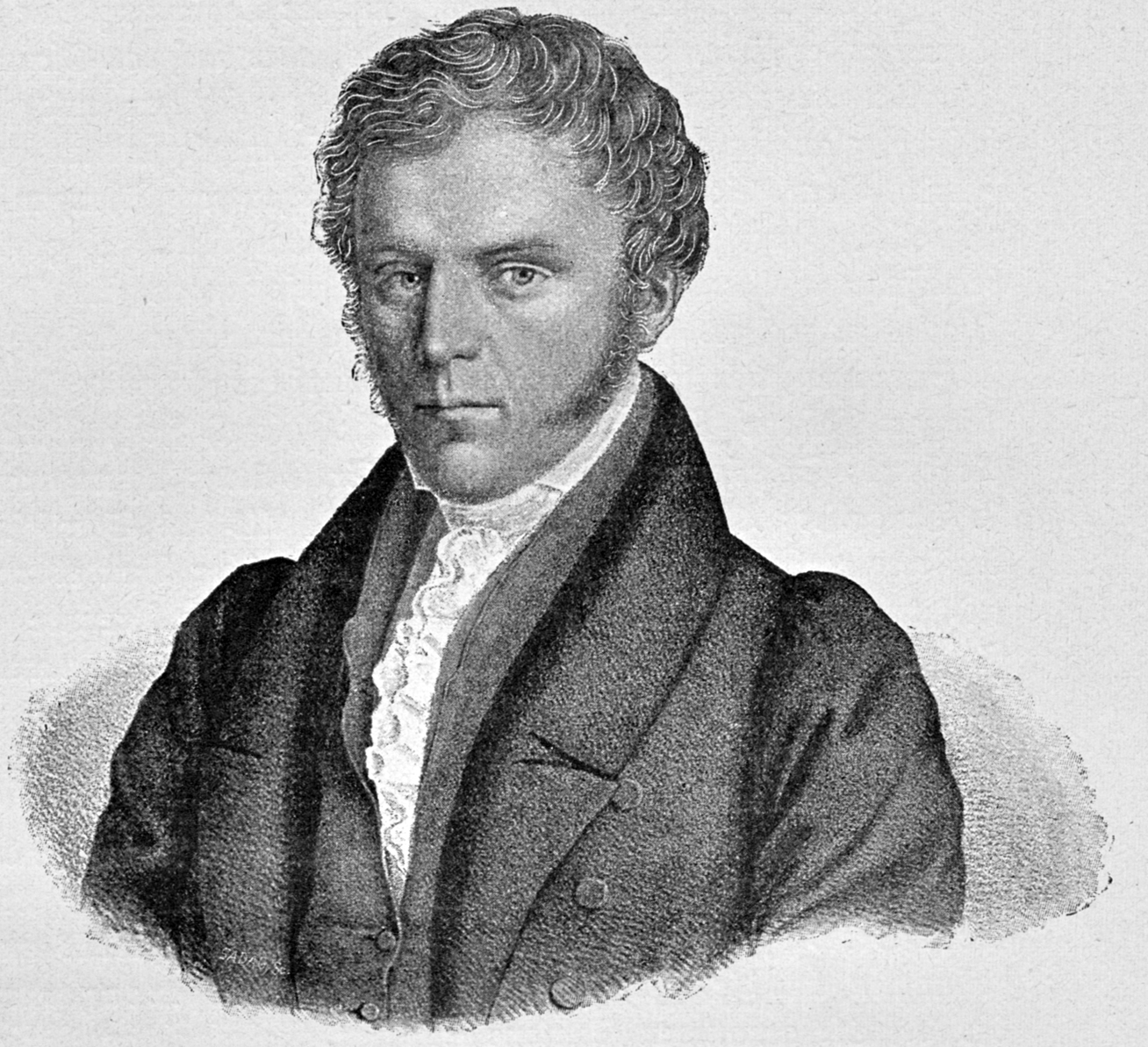
Casimir Pfyffer was five time president

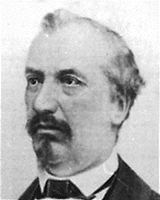
Victor Ruffy was the first native French speaker (1867)

Name	Canton	From	To
Johann Konrad Kern	Thurgau	1848	1850
Casimir Pfyffer	Lucerne	1851	1851
Johann Konrad Kern	Thurgau	1852	1852
Casimir Pfyffer	Lucerne	1853	1853
Johann Jakob Rüttimann	Zürich	1854	1854
Johann Jakob Trog	Solothurn	1854	1854
Eduard Blösch	Bern	1855	1855
Casimir Pfyffer	Lucerne	1856	1856
Jakob Dubs	Zürich	1857	1857
Johann Jakob Blumer	Glarus	1858	1858
Casimir Pfyffer	Lucerne	1859	1859
Gottlieb Jäger	St. Gallen	1860	1860
Casimir Pfyffer	Lucerne	1861	1861
Arnold Otto Aepli	St. Gallen	1862	1862
Eduard Blösch	Bern	1863	1863
Josef Wilhelm Viktor Vigier	Solothurn	1864	1864
Nicolaus Hermann	Obwalden	1865	1865
Eduard Häberlin	Thurgau	1866	1866
Victor Ruffy	Vaud	1867	1867
Johann Jakob Blumer	Glarus	1868	1868
Edouard Carlin	Jura	1869	1869
Jost Weber	Lucerne	1870	1870
Johann Jakob Blumer	Glarus	1871	1871
Eugène Borel	Neuchâtel	1872	1872
Josef Wilhelm Viktor Vigier	Solothurn	1873	1873
Johann Jakob Blumer	Glarus	1874	1874
Jules Roguin	Vaud	1876	1876
Josef Karl Pankraz Morel	St. Gallen	1879	1880
Johann Conrad Weber	Aargau	1881	1882
Jules Roguin	Vaud	1883	1884
Gaudenzio Olgiati	Grisons	1885	1886
Alois Kopp	Lucerne	1887	1888
Heinrich Stamm	Schaffhausen	1889	1890
Josef Bläsi	Solothurn	1891	1892
Heinrich Hafner	Zürich	1893	1894
Johann Broye	Fribourg	1895	1896
Charles-Henri Soldan	Vaud	1897	1898
Emil Rott	Bern	1899	1900
Johannes Winkler	Lucerne	1901	1902
Jakob Huldreich Bachmann	Thurgau	1903	1904
Agostino Soldati	Ticino	1904	1904
Frédéric Auguste Monnier	Neuchâtel	1905	1906
Carl Jäger	St. Gallen	1907	1908
Emile Perrier	Fribourg	1909	1910
Viktor Merz	Bern	1911	1912
Heinrich Honegger	Zürich	1915	1916
Albert Ursprung	Aargau	1918	1919
Ernest Picot	Geneva	1919	1920
Fritz Ostertag	Basel-Stadt	1921	1922
Franz Schmid	Uri	1923	1923
Albert Affolter	Solothurn	1924	1924
Alfred Stooss	Bern	1925	1925
Emil Kirchhofer	Schaffhausen	1927	1928
Virgile Rossel	Bern	1929	1930
Hans Müri	Aargau	1931	1932
Henri Thelin	Vaud	1933	1934
Arthur Couchepin	Valais	1935	1936
Josef Jakob Strebel	Aargau	1937	1938
Robert Fazy	Geneva	1939	1940
Léon Robert	Neuchâtel	1941	1942
Hans Steiner	Schwyz	1943	1944
Plinio Bolla	Ticino	1945	1946
Georg Leuch	Bern	1947	1948
Eugen Blocher	Basel-Stadt	1949	1950
Walter Nägeli	Zürich	1951	1952
Louis Python	Fribourg	1953	1954
Robert Petitmermet	Vaud	1955	1956
Wilhelm Stauffer	Bern	1957	1958
Carlo Pometta	Ticino	1959	1960
Wilhelm Schönenberger	St. Gallen	1961	1962
Franz Fässler	Appenzell Innerrhoden	1963	1964
Fritz Häberlin	Thurgau	1965	1966
André Panchaud	Vaud	1967	1968
Silvio Giovanoli	Grisons	1969	1970
Paul Schwartz	Basel-Stadt	1971	1972
Hans Tschopp	Zürich	1973	1974
Pierre Cavin	Vaud	1975	1976
André Grisel	Neuchâtel	1977	1978
Harald Huber	St. Gallen	1979	1980
Rolando Forni	Ticino	1981	1982
Otto Konstantin Kaufmann	St. Gallen	1983	1984
Arthur Haefliger	Solothurn	1985	1986
Erhard Schweri	Zürich	1987	1988
Rolf Raschein	Grisons	1989	1990
Robert Patry	Geneva	1991	1992
Jean-François Egli	Neuchâtel	1993	1994
Claude Rouiller	Valais	1995	1996
Peter Alexander Müller	Valais	1997	1998
Martin Schubarth	Basel-Stadt	1999	2000
Hans Peter Walter	Bern	2001	2002
Heinz Aemisegger	Schaffhausen	2003	2004
Giusep Nay	Grisons	2005	2006
Arthur Aeschlimann	Bern	2007	2008
Lorenz Meyer	Bern	2009	2012
Gilbert Kolly	Fribourg	2013	2016
Ulrich Meyer	Bern	2017	
