= List of members of the Federal Assembly from the Canton of Ticino =

Coat of Arms

This is a list of members of both houses of the Federal Assembly from the Canton of Ticino.

== Members of the Council of States ==
Councillor (Party)	Election	Councillor (Party)
Giuseppe Curti; Free Democratic Party; 1848–1850	Appointed	Bernardo Pfiffer; Liberal Party; 1848–1849
Giuseppe Curti; Free Democratic Party; 1848–1850	Appointed	Domenico Pedrazzi; Free Democratic Party; 1849–1850
Natale Vicari; Free Democratic Party; 1850–1851	Appointed	A. Domenico Galli; Free Democratic Party; 1851–1851
Domenico Pedrazzi; Free Democratic Party; 1851–1851	Appointed	Giovan Battista Ramelli; Free Democratic Party; 1851–1852
Giovanni Airoldi; Partito dei Popolini poi Fusionisti; 1852–1853	Appointed	Ambrogio Bertoni; Free Democratic Party; 1852–1853
Domenico Pedrazzi; Free Democratic Party; 1853–1854	Appointed	Giovan Battista Ramelli; Free Democratic Party; 1853–1854
Giacomo Luvini; Free Democratic Party; 1854–1855	Appointed	Giovanni Battista Pioda; Free Democratic Party; 1854–1855
Carlo Battaglini; Free Democratic Party; 1855–1856	Appointed	Cristoforo Motta; Free Democratic Party; 1855–1856
Sebastiano Beroldingen; Free Democratic Party; 1856–1857	Appointed	Benigno Zaccheo; Free Democratic Party; 1856–1857
Costantino Monighetti; Free Democratic Party; 1858–1860	Appointed	Natale Vicari; Free Democratic Party; 1858–1860
Sebastiano Beroldingen; Free Democratic Party; 1860–1862	Appointed	Ambrogio Bertoni; Free Democratic Party; 1860–1862
Antonio Bossi; Free Democratic Party; 1862–1863	Appointed	Ernesto Bruni; Popolini; 1862–1863
Carlo Olgiati; Free Democratic Party; 1863–1864	Appointed	Ernesto Bruni; Popolini; 1862–1863
Augusto Fogliardi; Free Democratic Party; 1864–1864	Appointed	Carl'Antonio Forni; Free Democratic Party; 1864–1864
Alessandro Franchini; Free Democratic Party; 1865–1866	Appointed	Cristoforo Motta; Free Democratic Party; 1865–1866
Agostino Demarchi; Free Democratic Party; 1866–1868	Appointed	
Agostino Demarchi; Free Democratic Party; 1866–1868	Appointed	Carlo Olgiati; Free Democratic Party; 1867–1867
Leone de Stoppani; Partito dei Popolini; 1868–1869	Appointed	Giuseppe Fratecolla; Free Democratic Party; 1868–1870
Giovanni Airoldi; Partito dei Popolini poi Fusionisti; 1869–1874	Appointed	Giuseppe Fratecolla; Free Democratic Party; 1868–1870
Giovanni Airoldi; Partito dei Popolini poi Fusionisti; 1869–1874	Appointed	Luigi Bolla; Free Democratic Party; 1870–1871
Giovanni Airoldi; Partito dei Popolini poi Fusionisti; 1869–1874	Appointed	Carlo Dotta; Free Democratic Party; 1871–1872
Giovanni Airoldi; Partito dei Popolini poi Fusionisti; 1869–1874	Appointed	Paolo Mordasini; Free Democratic Party; 1872–1874
Costantino Bernasconi; Free Democratic Party; 1874–1875	Appointed	A. Giovanni Jauch; Free Democratic Party; 1874–1875
Alberto Franzoni; Conservative; 1875–1879	Appointed	Ermengildo Rossi; Conservative; 1875–1877
Alberto Franzoni; Conservative; 1875–1879	Appointed	Giovanni Reali; Conservative; 1877–1889
Giovacchino Respini; Conservative; 1879–1885	Appointed	Giovanni Reali; Conservative; 1877–1889
Francesco Balli; Conservative; 1885–1892	Appointed	Giovanni Reali; Conservative; 1877–1889
Francesco Balli; Conservative; 1885–1892	Appointed	Agostino Soldati; Conservative; 1889–1893
Giovanni Lurati; Conservative; 1892–1893	Appointed	Agostino Soldati; Conservative; 1889–1893
Antonio Battaglini; Free Democratic Party; 1893–1907	Appointed	Rinaldo Simen; Free Democratic Party; 1893–1910
Adolfo Soldini; Free Democratic Party; 1908–1920	Appointed	Rinaldo Simen; Free Democratic Party; 1893–1910
Adolfo Soldini; Free Democratic Party; 1908–1920	Appointed	Stefano Gabuzzi; Free Democratic Party; 1910–1920
Brenno Bertoni; Free Democratic Party; 1920–1935	Appointed	Emilio Bossi; Free Democratic Party; 1920–1920
Brenno Bertoni; Free Democratic Party; 1920–1935	Appointed	Arnaldo Luigi Bolla; Free Democratic Party; 1921–1923
Brenno Bertoni; Free Democratic Party; 1920–1935	Appointed	Antonio Luigi Riva; Conservative; 1923–1942
Arnaldo Luigi Bolla; Free Democratic Party; 1935–1942	Appointed	Antonio Luigi Riva; Conservative; 1923–1942
Bixio Bossi; Free Democratic Party; 1942–1959
Bixio Bossi; Free Democratic Party; 1942–1959	1943	Antonio Antognini; Conservative; 1943–1963
Bixio Bossi; Free Democratic Party; 1942–1959	1947	Antonio Antognini; Conservative; 1943–1963
Bixio Bossi; Free Democratic Party; 1942–1959	1951	Antonio Antognini; Conservative; 1943–1963
Bixio Bossi; Free Democratic Party; 1942–1959	1955	Antonio Antognini; Conservative; 1943–1963
Ferruccio Bolla; Free Democratic Party; 1959–1975	1959	Antonio Antognini; Conservative; 1943–1963
Ferruccio Bolla; Free Democratic Party; 1959–1975	1963	Alberto Stefani; Christian Social Conservative Party; 1963–1983
Ferruccio Bolla; Free Democratic Party; 1959–1975	1967	Alberto Stefani; Christian Social Conservative Party; 1963–1983
Ferruccio Bolla; Free Democratic Party; 1959–1975	1971	Alberto Stefani; Christian Social Conservative Party; 1963–1983
Franco Masoni; Free Democratic Party; 1975–1979	1975	Alberto Stefani; Christian Social Conservative Party; 1963–1983
Luigi Generali; Liberal Party; 1979–1983	1979	Alberto Stefani; Christian Social Conservative Party; 1963–1983
Camillo Jelmini; Christian Democratic People's Party; 1983–1991	1983	Franco Masoni; Free Democratic Party; 1983–1991
Camillo Jelmini; Christian Democratic People's Party; 1983–1991	1987	Franco Masoni; Free Democratic Party; 1983–1991
Giorgio Morniroli; Ticino League; 1991–1995	1991	Sergio Salvioni; Free Democratic Party; 1991–1995
Renzo Respini; Christian Democratic People's Party; 1995–1999	1995	Dick Marty; Free Democratic Party; 1995–2009; FDP.The Liberals; 2009–2011
Filippo Lombardi; Christian Democratic People's Party; 1999–present	1999	Dick Marty; Free Democratic Party; 1995–2009; FDP.The Liberals; 2009–2011
Filippo Lombardi; Christian Democratic People's Party; 1999–present	2003	Dick Marty; Free Democratic Party; 1995–2009; FDP.The Liberals; 2009–2011
Filippo Lombardi; Christian Democratic People's Party; 1999–present	2007	Dick Marty; Free Democratic Party; 1995–2009; FDP.The Liberals; 2009–2011
Filippo Lombardi; Christian Democratic People's Party; 1999–present	2009	Dick Marty; Free Democratic Party; 1995–2009; FDP.The Liberals; 2009–2011
Filippo Lombardi; Christian Democratic People's Party; 1999–present	2011	Fabio Abate; FDP.The Liberals; 2011–2019
Filippo Lombardi; Christian Democratic People's Party; 1999–present	2015	Fabio Abate; FDP.The Liberals; 2011–2019
Marco Chiesa; Swiss People's Party; 2019–present	2019	Marina Carobbio Guscetti; Social Democratic Party; 2019–2023
Marco Chiesa; Swiss People's Party; 2019–present	2023	Fabio Regazzi; The Centre; 2023–present

== Members of the National Council ==
Election	Councillor (Party)	Councillor (Party)	Councillor (Party)	Councillor (Party)	Councillor (Party)	Councillor (Party)	Councillor (Party)	Councillor (Party)
1848	Carlo Battaglini (FDP/PRD)	Stefano Franscini (FDP/PRD)	A. Giovanni Jauch (FDP/PRD)	Giacomo Luvini (FDP/PRD)	Giovanni Battista Pioda (FDP/PRD)	Benigno Soldini (FDP/PRD)	6 seats 1848–1882	
1849	Carlo Battaglini (FDP/PRD)	Sevorino Guscetti (FDP/PRD)	A. Giovanni Jauch (FDP/PRD)	Giacomo Luvini (FDP/PRD)	Giovanni Battista Pioda (FDP/PRD)	Benigno Soldini (FDP/PRD)	6 seats 1848–1882	
1850	Agostino Demarchi (FDP/PRD)	Sevorino Guscetti (FDP/PRD)	A. Giovanni Jauch (FDP/PRD)	Giacomo Luvini (FDP/PRD)	Giovanni Battista Pioda (FDP/PRD)	Benigno Soldini (FDP/PRD)	6 seats 1848–1882	
1851	Agostino Demarchi (FDP/PRD)	Rocco Bonzanigo (Liberal)	A. Giovanni Jauch (FDP/PRD)	Giacomo Luvini (FDP/PRD)	Giovanni Battista Pioda (FDP/PRD)	Benigno Soldini (FDP/PRD)	6 seats 1848–1882	
1852	Agostino Demarchi (FDP/PRD)	Rocco Bonzanigo (Liberal)	Valentino Alessandro Balli (Liberal)	Giacomo Luvini (FDP/PRD)	Giovanni Battista Pioda (FDP/PRD)	Augusto Fogliardi (FDP/PRD)	6 seats 1848–1882	
1854	Cesare Bernasconi (FDP/PRD)	A. Giovanni Jauch (FDP/PRD)	Giuseppe Pattocchi (FDP/PRD)	Giacomo Luvini (FDP/PRD)	Giovanni Battista Pioda (FDP/PRD)	Giovan Battista Ramelli (FDP/PRD)	6 seats 1848–1882	
1857	Cesare Bernasconi (FDP/PRD)	A. Giovanni Jauch (FDP/PRD)	Giuseppe Pattocchi (FDP/PRD)	Giacomo Luvini (FDP/PRD)	Giovanni Battista Pioda (FDP/PRD)	Giovan Battista Ramelli (FDP/PRD)	6 seats 1848–1882	
1858	Cesare Bernasconi (FDP/PRD)	A. Giovanni Jauch (FDP/PRD)	Giuseppe Pattocchi (FDP/PRD)	Giacomo Luvini (FDP/PRD)	Giacomo Ciani (FDP/PRD)	Giovan Battista Ramelli (FDP/PRD)	6 seats 1848–1882	
1860	Michele Pedrazzini (PdP (TI)*)	A. Giovanni Jauch (FDP/PRD)	Giuseppe Pattocchi (FDP/PRD)	Giacomo Luvini (FDP/PRD)	Carlo Soldini (FDP/PRD)	Giovan Battista Ramelli (FDP/PRD)	6 seats 1848–1882	
1861	Michele Pedrazzini (PdP (TI)*)	A. Giovanni Jauch (FDP/PRD)	Daniele Capponi (FDP/PRD)	Giacomo Luvini (FDP/PRD)	Carlo Soldini (FDP/PRD)	Giovan Battista Ramelli (FDP/PRD)	6 seats 1848–1882	
1862	Michele Pedrazzini (PdP (TI)*)	A. Giovanni Jauch (FDP/PRD)	Daniele Capponi (FDP/PRD)	Carlo Battaglini (FDP/PRD)	Carlo Soldini (FDP/PRD)	Giovan Battista Ramelli (FDP/PRD)	6 seats 1848–1882	
1863	Michele Pedrazzini (PdP (TI)*)	A. Giovanni Jauch (FDP/PRD)	Costantino Bernasconi (FDP/PRD)	Carlo Battaglini (FDP/PRD)	Antonio Bossi (FDP/PRD)	Augusto Fogliardi (FDP/PRD)	6 seats 1848–1882	
1864	Michele Pedrazzini (PdP (TI)*)	A. Giovanni Jauch (FDP/PRD)	Costantino Bernasconi (FDP/PRD)	Carlo Battaglini (FDP/PRD)	Antonio Bossi (FDP/PRD)	Luigi Rusca (FDP/PRD)	6 seats 1848–1882	
1866	Michele Pedrazzini (PdP (TI)*)	A. Giovanni Jauch (FDP/PRD)	Costantino Bernasconi (FDP/PRD)	Carlo Battaglini (FDP/PRD)	Giovanni Polar (Conservative)	Luigi Rusca (FDP/PRD)	6 seats 1848–1882	
1868	Michele Pedrazzini (PdP (TI)*)	A. Giovanni Jauch (FDP/PRD)	Costantino Bernasconi (FDP/PRD)	Carlo Battaglini (FDP/PRD)	Giuseppe Soldini (FDP/PRD)	Luigi Rusca (FDP/PRD)	6 seats 1848–1882	
1869	Michele Pedrazzini (PdP (TI)*)	A. Giovanni Jauch (FDP/PRD)	Costantino Bernasconi (FDP/PRD)	Carlo Battaglini (FDP/PRD)	Giuseppe Soldini (FDP/PRD)	Luigi Rusca (FDP/PRD)	6 seats 1848–1882	
1872	Michele Pedrazzini (PdP (TI)*)	A. Giovanni Jauch (FDP/PRD)	Massimiliano Magatti (Conservative)	Carlo Battaglini (FDP/PRD)	Carlo Vonmentlen (Conservative)	Luigi Rusca (FDP/PRD)	6 seats 1848–1882	
1873	Agostino Gatti (Conservative)	Emilio Censi (FDP/PRD)	Massimiliano Magatti (Conservative)	Carlo Battaglini (FDP/PRD)	Carlo Vonmentlen (Conservative)	Martino Pedrazzini (Conservative)	6 seats 1848–1882	
1875	Agostino Gatti (Conservative)	Bernardino Lurati (Conservative)	Massimiliano Magatti (Conservative)	Carlo Pasta (Conservative)	Carlo Vonmentlen (Conservative)	Martino Pedrazzini (Conservative)	6 seats 1848–1882	
1878	Agostino Gatti (Conservative)	Bernardino Lurati (Conservative)	Massimiliano Magatti (Conservative)	Erennio Spinelli (Conservative)	Carlo Vonmentlen (Conservative)	Martino Pedrazzini (Conservative)	6 seats 1848–1882	
1880	Agostino Gatti (Conservative)	Ignazio Polar (Conservative)	Massimiliano Magatti (Conservative)	Erennio Spinelli (Conservative)	Carlo Vonmentlen (Conservative)	Martino Pedrazzini (Conservative)	6 seats 1848–1882	
1881	Agostino Gatti (Conservative)	Ignazio Polar (Conservative)	Giovanni Dazzoni (Conservative)	vacant	Carlo Vonmentlen (Conservative)	Martino Pedrazzini (Conservative)	6 seats 1848–1882	
1882	Agostino Gatti (Conservative)	Ignazio Polar (Conservative)	Giovanni Dazzoni (Conservative)	Carlo Battaglini (FDP/PRD)	Carlo Vonmentlen (Conservative)	Martino Pedrazzini (Conservative)	Costantino Bernasconi (FDP/PRD)	7 seats 1882–1890
1884	Agostino Gatti (Conservative)	Ignazio Polar (Conservative)	Giovanni Dazzoni (Conservative)	Carlo Battaglini (FDP/PRD)	Carlo Vonmentlen (Conservative)	Martino Pedrazzini (Conservative)	Costantino Bernasconi (FDP/PRD)	7 seats 1882–1890
1887	Agostino Gatti (Conservative)	Ignazio Polar (Conservative)	Giovanni Dazzoni (Conservative)	Leone de Stoppani (FDP/PRD)	Filippo Bonzanigo (Conservative)	Martino Pedrazzini (Conservative)	Costantino Bernasconi (FDP/PRD)	7 seats 1882–1890
1890	Agostino Gatti (Conservative)	Ignazio Polar (Conservative)	Giuseppe Volonterio (Conservative)	Leone de Stoppani (FDP/PRD)	Filippo Bonzanigo (Conservative)	6 seats 1890–1902	Costantino Bernasconi (FDP/PRD)	6 seats 1890–1902
1893	Plinio Bolla (FDP/PRD)	Achille Borella (FDP/PRD)	Germano Bruni (FDP/PRD)	Leone de Stoppani (FDP/PRD)	Demetrio Camuzzi (FDP/PRD)	6 seats 1890–1902	Alfredo Pioda (FDP/PRD)	6 seats 1890–1902
1895	Plinio Bolla (FDP/PRD)	Achille Borella (FDP/PRD)	Germano Bruni (FDP/PRD)	Romeo Manzoni (FDP/PRD)	Demetrio Camuzzi (FDP/PRD)	6 seats 1890–1902	Alfredo Pioda (FDP/PRD)	6 seats 1890–1902
1896	Cesare Bolla (FDP/PRD)	Achille Borella (FDP/PRD)	Filippo Rusconi (FDP/PRD)	Romeo Manzoni (FDP/PRD)	Demetrio Camuzzi (FDP/PRD)	6 seats 1890–1902	Alfredo Pioda (FDP/PRD)	6 seats 1890–1902
1899	Giovanni Lurati (Conservative)	Achille Borella (FDP/PRD)	Filippo Rusconi (FDP/PRD)	Romeo Manzoni (FDP/PRD)	Giuseppe Motta (Conservative)	6 seats 1890–1902	Alfredo Pioda (FDP/PRD)	6 seats 1890–1902
1902	Giovanni Lurati (Conservative)	Achille Borella (FDP/PRD)	Emilio Censi (FDP/PRD)	Antonio Soldini (FDP/PRD)	Giuseppe Motta (Conservative)	Giuseppe Stoffel (FDP/PRD)	Alfredo Pioda (FDP/PRD)	7 seats 1902–1912
1905	Giovanni Lurati (Conservative)	Achille Borella (FDP/PRD)	Emilio Censi (FDP/PRD)	Romeo Manzoni (FDP/PRD)	Giuseppe Motta (Conservative)	Giuseppe Stoffel (FDP/PRD)	Alfredo Pioda (FDP/PRD)	7 seats 1902–1912
1908	Mario Ferri (SP/PS)	Achille Borella (FDP/PRD)	Francesco Vassalli (FDP/PRD)	Romeo Manzoni (FDP/PRD)	Giuseppe Motta (Conservative)	Giuseppe Stoffel (FDP/PRD)	Alfredo Pioda (FDP/PRD)	7 seats 1902–1912
1909	Mario Ferri (SP/PS)	Achille Borella (FDP/PRD)	Francesco Vassalli (FDP/PRD)	Romeo Manzoni (FDP/PRD)	Giuseppe Motta (Conservative)	Giuseppe Stoffel (FDP/PRD)	Evaristo Garbani (FDP/PRD)	7 seats 1902–1912
1911	Francesco Balli (Conservative)	Achille Borella (FDP/PRD)	Francesco Vassalli (FDP/PRD)	Romeo Manzoni (FDP/PRD)	Giovanni Lurati (Conservative)	Giuseppe Stoffel (FDP/PRD)	Evaristo Garbani (FDP/PRD)	7 seats 1902–1912
1912	Francesco Balli (Conservative)	Achille Borella (FDP/PRD)	Francesco Vassalli (FDP/PRD)	Giuseppe Cattori (Conservative)	Giovanni Lurati (Conservative)	Giuseppe Stoffel (FDP/PRD)	Evaristo Garbani (FDP/PRD)	7 seats 1902–1912
1912	Francesco Balli (Conservative)	Achille Borella (FDP/PRD)	Francesco Vassalli (FDP/PRD)	Giuseppe Cattori (Conservative)	Giovanni Lurati (Conservative)	Giuseppe Stoffel (FDP/PRD)	Evaristo Garbani (FDP/PRD)	Antonio Fusoni (FDP/PRD)
1914	Francesco Balli (Conservative)	Achille Borella (FDP/PRD)	Francesco Vassalli (FDP/PRD)	Giuseppe Cattori (Conservative)	Angelo Tarchini (Conservative)	Brenno Bertoni (FDP/PRD)	Evaristo Garbani (FDP/PRD)	Emilio Bossi (FDP/PRD)
1915	Francesco Balli (Conservative)	Achille Borella (FDP/PRD)	Francesco Vassalli (FDP/PRD)	Alfonso Chicherio (Conservative)	Angelo Tarchini (Conservative)	Brenno Bertoni (FDP/PRD)	Evaristo Garbani (FDP/PRD)	Emilio Bossi (FDP/PRD)
1917	Giuseppe Cattori (Conservative)	Achille Borella (FDP/PRD)	Francesco Vassalli (FDP/PRD)	Alfonso Chicherio (Conservative)	Antonio Luigi Riva (Conservative)	Brenno Bertoni (FDP/PRD)	Evaristo Garbani (FDP/PRD)	Emilio Bossi (FDP/PRD)
1919	Giuseppe Cattori (Conservative)	Achille Borella (FDP/PRD)	Tomaso Pagnamenta (Conservative)	Alfonso Chicherio (Conservative)	Antonio Luigi Riva (Conservative)	Brenno Bertoni (FDP/PRD)	Evaristo Garbani (FDP/PRD)	Emilio Bossi (FDP/PRD)
1919	Giuseppe Cattori (Conservative)	Achille Borella (FDP/PRD)	Francesco Antognini (Conservative)	Luigi A. Balestra (Conservative)	Guglielmo Canevascini (SP/PS)	Brenno Bertoni (FDP/PRD)	Evaristo Garbani (FDP/PRD)	Emilio Bossi (FDP/PRD)
1920	Giuseppe Cattori (Conservative)	Achille Borella (FDP/PRD)	Francesco Antognini (Conservative)	Luigi A. Balestra (Conservative)	Guglielmo Canevascini (SP/PS)	Arnaldo Luigi Bolla (FDP/PRD)	Evaristo Garbani (FDP/PRD)	Gaetano Donini (PAB)
1921	Giuseppe Cattori (Conservative)	Achille Borella (FDP/PRD)	Francesco Antognini (Conservative)	Luigi A. Balestra (Conservative)	Guglielmo Canevascini (SP/PS)	Alberto Vigizzi (FDP/PRD)	Evaristo Garbani (FDP/PRD)	Gaetano Donini (PAB)
1922	Giuseppe Cattori (Conservative)	Otto Maraini (FDP/PRD)	Francesco Antognini (Conservative)	Luigi A. Balestra (Conservative)	Francesco-Nino Borella (SP/PS)	Alberto Vigizzi (FDP/PRD)	Evaristo Garbani (FDP/PRD)	Gaetano Donini (PAB)
1922	Ruggero Dollfus (Conservative)	Carlo Maggini (FDP/PRD)	Angelo Tarchini (Conservative)	Luigi A. Balestra (Conservative)	Edoardo Zeli (SP/PS)	Alberto Vigizzi (FDP/PRD)	Francesco Rusca (FDP/PRD)	Camillo Olgiati (FDP/PRD)
1923	Ruggero Dollfus (Conservative)	Carlo Maggini (FDP/PRD)	Secondo-Vittorio Antognini (Conservative)	Luigi A. Balestra (Conservative)	Edoardo Zeli (SP/PS)	Alberto Vigizzi (FDP/PRD)	Francesco Rusca (FDP/PRD)	Camillo Olgiati (FDP/PRD)
1924	Ruggero Dollfus (Conservative)	Carlo Maggini (FDP/PRD)	Enrico Celio (Conservative)	Luigi A. Balestra (Conservative)	Edoardo Zeli (SP/PS)	Alberto Vigizzi (FDP/PRD)	Francesco Rusca (FDP/PRD)	Camillo Olgiati (FDP/PRD)
1925	Ruggero Dollfus (Conservative)	Carlo Maggini (FDP/PRD)	Paolo Pedrazzini (Conservative)	Luigi A. Balestra (Conservative)	Edoardo Zeli (SP/PS)	Alberto Vigizzi (FDP/PRD)	Francesco Rusca (FDP/PRD)	Camillo Olgiati (FDP/PRD)
1925	Ruggero Dollfus (Conservative)	Carlo Maggini (FDP/PRD)	Angelo Tarchini (Conservative)	Luigi A. Balestra (Conservative)	Edoardo Zeli (SP/PS)	Alberto Vigizzi (FDP/PRD)	Francesco Rusca (FDP/PRD)	Camillo Olgiati (FDP/PRD)
1926	Ruggero Dollfus (Conservative)	Antonio Galli (FDP/PRD)	Angelo Tarchini (Conservative)	Luigi A. Balestra (Conservative)	Edoardo Zeli (SP/PS)	Alberto Vigizzi (FDP/PRD)	Francesco Rusca (FDP/PRD)	Camillo Olgiati (FDP/PRD)
1927	Ruggero Dollfus (Conservative)	Carlo Censi (FDP/PRD)	Enrico Celio (Conservative)	Luigi A. Balestra (Conservative)	Edoardo Zeli (SP/PS)	Giovan-Battista Rusca (FDP/PRD)	Francesco Rusca (FDP/PRD)	Camillo Olgiati (FDP/PRD)
1928	Ruggero Dollfus (Conservative)	Carlo Censi (FDP/PRD)	Giovanni Polar (Conservative)	Angelo Tarchini (Conservative)	Francesco-Nino Borella (SP/PS)	Giovan-Battista Rusca (FDP/PRD)	Francesco Rusca (FDP/PRD)	Camillo Olgiati (FDP/PRD)
1930	Ruggero Dollfus (Conservative)	Carlo Censi (FDP/PRD)	Giovanni Polar (Conservative)	Enrico Celio (Conservative)	Francesco-Nino Borella (SP/PS)	Giovan-Battista Rusca (FDP/PRD)	Francesco Rusca (FDP/PRD)	Camillo Olgiati (FDP/PRD)
1931	Ruggero Dollfus (Conservative)	Bixio Bossi (FDP/PRD)	Riccardo Rossi (Conservative)	Enrico Celio (Conservative)	Francesco-Nino Borella (SP/PS)	Carlo Maggini (FDP/PRD)	Francesco Rusca (FDP/PRD)	7 seats 1931–1971
1932	Ruggero Dollfus (Conservative)	Bixio Bossi (FDP/PRD)	Riccardo Rossi (Conservative)	Angelo Tarchini (Conservative)	Francesco-Nino Borella (SP/PS)	Carlo Maggini (FDP/PRD)	Francesco Rusca (FDP/PRD)	7 seats 1931–1971
1933	Ruggero Dollfus (Conservative)	Bixio Bossi (FDP/PRD)	Riccardo Rossi (Conservative)	Giovanni Polar (Conservative)	Francesco-Nino Borella (SP/PS)	Carlo Maggini (FDP/PRD)	Francesco Rusca (FDP/PRD)	7 seats 1931–1971
1935	Ruggero Dollfus (Conservative)	Bixio Bossi (FDP/PRD)	Riccardo Rossi (Conservative)	Antonio Antognini (Conservative)	Edoardo Zeli (SP/PS)	Giovan-Battista Rusca (FDP/PRD)	Francesco Rusca (FDP/PRD)	7 seats 1931–1971
1939	Ruggero Dollfus (Conservative)	Bixio Bossi (FDP/PRD)	Riccardo Rossi (Conservative)	Antonio Antognini (Conservative)	Edoardo Zeli (SP/PS)	Giovan-Battista Rusca (FDP/PRD)	Francesco Rusca (FDP/PRD)	7 seats 1931–1971
1940	Ruggero Dollfus (Conservative)	Bixio Bossi (FDP/PRD)	Angelo Tarchini (Conservative)	Antonio Antognini (Conservative)	Edoardo Zeli (SP/PS)	Giovan-Battista Rusca (FDP/PRD)	Francesco Rusca (FDP/PRD)	7 seats 1931–1971
1941	Ruggero Dollfus (Conservative)	Bixio Bossi (FDP/PRD)	Adolfo Janner (Conservative)	Antonio Antognini (Conservative)	Edoardo Zeli (SP/PS)	Giovan-Battista Rusca (FDP/PRD)	Francesco Rusca (FDP/PRD)	7 seats 1931–1971
1942	Ruggero Dollfus (Conservative)	Aleardo Pini (FDP/PRD)	Adolfo Janner (Conservative)	Antonio Antognini (Conservative)	Edoardo Zeli (SP/PS)	Giovan-Battista Rusca (FDP/PRD)	Francesco Rusca (FDP/PRD)	7 seats 1931–1971
1943	Franco Maspoli (Conservative)	Aleardo Pini (FDP/PRD)	Adolfo Janner (Conservative)	Waldo Riva (Conservative)	Edoardo Zeli (SP/PS)	Mario Agustoni (FDP/PRD)	Francesco-Nino Borella (SP/PS)	7 seats 1931–1971
1947	Franco Maspoli (Conservative)	Aleardo Pini (FDP/PRD)	Adolfo Janner (Conservative)	Rodolfo Bordoni (Conservative)	Emilio Agostinetti (SP/PS)	Francesco Rusca (FDP/PRD)	Giovan-Battista Rusca (FDP/PRD)	7 seats 1931–1971
1951	Franco Maspoli (Conservative)	Aleardo Pini (FDP/PRD)	Waldo Riva (Conservative)	Rodolfo Bordoni (Conservative)	Emilio Agostinetti (SP/PS)	Francesco Rusca (FDP/PRD)	Giovan-Battista Rusca (FDP/PRD)	7 seats 1931–1971
1951	Franco Maspoli (Conservative)	Aleardo Pini (FDP/PRD)	Francesco Masina (Conservative)	Rodolfo Bordoni (Conservative)	Emilio Agostinetti (SP/PS)	Giulio Guglielmetti (FDP/PRD)	Giovan-Battista Rusca (FDP/PRD)	7 seats 1931–1971
1955	Franco Maspoli (Conservative)	Aleardo Pini (FDP/PRD)	Francesco Masina (Conservative)	Alberto Verda (Conservative)	Emilio Agostinetti (SP/PS)	Giulio Guglielmetti (FDP/PRD)	Libero Olgiati (FDP/PRD)	7 seats 1931–1971
1958	Franco Maspoli (Conservative)	Pierino Tatti (FDP/PRD)	Francesco Masina (Conservative)	Alberto Verda (Conservative)	Emilio Agostinetti (SP/PS)	Giulio Guglielmetti (FDP/PRD)	Libero Olgiati (FDP/PRD)	7 seats 1931–1971
1959	Franco Maspoli (Conservative)	Pierino Tatti (FDP/PRD)	Enrico Franzoni (CCS)	Arturo Lafranchi (CCS)	Emilio Agostinetti (SP/PS)	Brenno Galli (FDP/PRD)	Libero Olgiati (FDP/PRD)	7 seats 1931–1971
1962	Franco Maspoli (Conservative)	Pierino Tatti (FDP/PRD)	Enrico Franzoni (CCS)	Silvio Jolli (CCS)	Emilio Agostinetti (SP/PS)	Brenno Galli (FDP/PRD)	Achille Borella (FDP/PRD)	7 seats 1931–1971
1963	Franco Maspoli (Conservative)	Guido Bustelli (FDP/PRD)	Enrico Franzoni (CCS)	Silvio Jolli (CCS)	Emilio Agostinetti (SP/PS)	Brenno Galli (FDP/PRD)	Achille Borella (FDP/PRD)	7 seats 1931–1971
1963	Franco Maspoli (Conservative)	Mario Agustoni (FDP/PRD)	Enrico Franzoni (CCS)	Ugo Gianella (CCS)	Emilio Agostinetti (SP/PS)	Brenno Galli (FDP/PRD)	Nello Celio (FDP/PRD)	7 seats 1931–1971
1965	Amedeo Boffa (CCS)	Achille Borella (FDP/PRD)	Enrico Franzoni (CCS)	Ugo Gianella (CCS)	Emilio Agostinetti (SP/PS)	Brenno Galli (FDP/PRD)	Nello Celio (FDP/PRD)	7 seats 1931–1971
1966	Arrigo Caroni (CCS)	Achille Borella (FDP/PRD)	Enrico Franzoni (CCS)	Ugo Gianella (CCS)	Emilio Agostinetti (SP/PS)	Brenno Galli (FDP/PRD)	Nello Celio (FDP/PRD)	7 seats 1931–1971
1967	Arrigo Caroni (CCS)	Franco Masoni (FDP/PRD)	Enrico Franzoni (CCS)	Ugo Gianella (CCS)	Libero Olgiati (FDP/PRD)	Brenno Galli (FDP/PRD)	Didier Wyler (SP/PS)	7 seats 1931–1971
1971	Arrigo Caroni (CCS)	Franco Masoni (FDP/PRD)	Enrico Franzoni (CCS)	Ugo Gianella (CCS)	Achille Borella (FDP/PRD)	Brenno Galli (FDP/PRD)	Didier Wyler (SP/PS)	7 seats 1931–1971
1971	Luigi Generali (Liberal)	Franco Masoni (FDP/PRD)	Enrico Franzoni (CCS)	Ugo Gianella (CCS)	Pier Felice Barchi (FDP/PRD)	Carlo Speziali (FDP/PRD)	Didier Wyler (SP/PS)	Camillo Jelmini (CVP/PDC)
1972	Luigi Generali (Liberal)	Franco Masoni (FDP/PRD)	Enrico Franzoni (CCS)	Gian Mario Pagani (CVP/PDC)	Pier Felice Barchi (FDP/PRD)	Carlo Speziali (FDP/PRD)	Didier Wyler (SP/PS)	Camillo Jelmini (CVP/PDC)
1975	Luigi Generali (Liberal)	Werner Carobbio (PdA/PST)	Giovan Battista Pedrazzini (CVP/PDC)	Gian Mario Pagani (CVP/PDC)	Pier Felice Barchi (FDP/PRD)	Carlo Speziali (FDP/PRD)	Didier Wyler (SP/PS)	Camillo Jelmini (CVP/PDC)
1979	Alma Bacciarini (FDP/PRD)	Werner Carobbio (PdA/PST)	Giovan Battista Pedrazzini (CVP/PDC)	Gianfranco Cotti (CVP/PDC)	Pier Felice Barchi (FDP/PRD)	Massimo Pini (FDP/PRD)	Dario Robbiani (SP/PS)	Camillo Jelmini (CVP/PDC)
1983	Luciano Giudici (FDP/PRD)	Werner Carobbio (PdA/PST)	Mario Grassi (CVP/PDC)	Gianfranco Cotti (CVP/PDC)	Massimo Pini (FDP/PRD)	Sergio Salvioni (FDP/PRD)	Dario Robbiani (SP/PS)	Flavio Cotti (CVP/PDC)
1987	Adriano Cavadini (FDP/PRD)	Werner Carobbio (PdA/PST)	Mario Grassi (CVP/PDC)	Gianfranco Cotti (CVP/PDC)	Massimo Pini (FDP/PRD)	Sergio Salvioni (FDP/PRD)	Fulvio Caccia (CVP/PDC)	Giovanni Baggi (CVP/PDC)
1991	Adriano Cavadini (FDP/PRD)	Werner Carobbio (PdA/PST)	Marco Borradori (Lega)	Gianfranco Cotti (CVP/PDC)	Massimo Pini (FDP/PRD)	Geo Camponovo (FDP/PRD)	Fulvio Caccia (CVP/PDC)	Flavio Maspoli (Lega)
1993	Adriano Cavadini (FDP/PRD)	Werner Carobbio (PdA/PST)	Marco Borradori (Lega)	Mimi Lepori Bonetti (CVP/PDC)	Massimo Pini (FDP/PRD)	Geo Camponovo (FDP/PRD)	Fulvio Caccia (CVP/PDC)	Flavio Maspoli (Lega)
1995	Adriano Cavadini (FDP/PRD)	Werner Carobbio (PdA/PST)	Giuliano Bignasca (Lega)	Mimi Lepori Bonetti (CVP/PDC)	Massimo Pini (FDP/PRD)	Geo Camponovo (FDP/PRD)	Fulvio Caccia (CVP/PDC)	Flavio Maspoli (Lega)
1995	Adriano Cavadini (FDP/PRD)	Werner Carobbio (PdA/PST)	Franco Cavalli (SP/PS)	Remigio Ratti (CVP/PDC)	Massimo Pini (FDP/PRD)	Fulvio Pelli (FDP/PRD)	Fulvio Caccia (CVP/PDC)	Flavio Maspoli (Lega)
1998	Adriano Cavadini (FDP/PRD)	Werner Carobbio (PdA/PST)	Franco Cavalli (SP/PS)	Remigio Ratti (CVP/PDC)	Massimo Pini (FDP/PRD)	Fulvio Pelli (FDP/PRD)	Franco Donati (CVP/PDC)	Flavio Maspoli (Lega)
1999	Gabriele Gendotti (FDP/PRD)	Giuliano Bignasca (Lega)	Franco Cavalli (SP/PS)	Meinrado Robbiani (CVP/PDC)	Fabio Pedrina (SP/PS)	Fulvio Pelli (FDP/PRD)	Chiara Simoneschi-Cortesi (CVP/PDC)	Flavio Maspoli (Lega)
2000	Fabio Abate (FDP/PRD / FDP.The Liberals)	Giuliano Bignasca (Lega)	Franco Cavalli (SP/PS)	Meinrado Robbiani (CVP/PDC)	Fabio Pedrina (SP/PS)	Fulvio Pelli (FDP/PRD)	Chiara Simoneschi-Cortesi (CVP/PDC)	Flavio Maspoli (Lega)
2003	Fabio Abate (FDP/PRD / FDP.The Liberals)	Attilio Bignasca (Lega)	Franco Cavalli (SP/PS)	Meinrado Robbiani (CVP/PDC)	Fabio Pedrina (SP/PS)	Fulvio Pelli (FDP/PRD)	Chiara Simoneschi-Cortesi (CVP/PDC)	Laura Sadis (FDP/PRD)
2007	Fabio Abate (FDP/PRD / FDP.The Liberals)	Attilio Bignasca (Lega)	Marina Carobbio Guscetti (SP/PS)	Meinrado Robbiani (CVP/PDC)	Fabio Pedrina (SP/PS)	Fulvio Pelli (FDP/PRD)	Chiara Simoneschi-Cortesi (CVP/PDC)	Ignazio Cassis (FDP/PRD / FDP.The Liberals)
2010	Fabio Abate (FDP/PRD / FDP.The Liberals)	Norman Gobbi (Lega)	Marina Carobbio Guscetti (SP/PS)	Meinrado Robbiani (CVP/PDC)	Fabio Pedrina (SP/PS)	Fulvio Pelli (FDP/PRD)	Chiara Simoneschi-Cortesi (CVP/PDC)	Ignazio Cassis (FDP/PRD / FDP.The Liberals)
2011	Roberta Pantani (Lega)	Lorenzo Quadri (Lega)	Marina Carobbio Guscetti (SP/PS)	Fabio Regazzi (CVP/PDC / The Centre)	Pierre Rusconi (SVP/UDC)	Fulvio Pelli (FDP/PRD)	Marco Romano (CVP/PDC)	Ignazio Cassis (FDP/PRD / FDP.The Liberals)
2014	Roberta Pantani (Lega)	Lorenzo Quadri (Lega)	Marina Carobbio Guscetti (SP/PS)	Fabio Regazzi (CVP/PDC / The Centre)	Pierre Rusconi (SVP/UDC)	Giovanni Merlini (FDP/PLR)	Marco Romano (CVP/PDC)	Ignazio Cassis (FDP/PRD / FDP.The Liberals)
2015	Roberta Pantani (Lega)	Lorenzo Quadri (Lega)	Marina Carobbio Guscetti (SP/PS)	Fabio Regazzi (CVP/PDC / The Centre)	Pierre Rusconi (SVP/UDC)	Giovanni Merlini (FDP/PLR)	Marco Chiesa (SVP/UDC)	Ignazio Cassis (FDP/PRD / FDP.The Liberals)
2017	Roberta Pantani (Lega)	Lorenzo Quadri (Lega)	Marina Carobbio Guscetti (SP/PS)	Fabio Regazzi (CVP/PDC / The Centre)	Rocco Cattaneo (FDP/PLR)	Giovanni Merlini (FDP/PLR)	Marco Chiesa (SVP/UDC)	Ignazio Cassis (FDP/PRD / FDP.The Liberals)
2019	Greta Gysin (GP/PV)	Lorenzo Quadri (Lega)	Bruno Storni (SP/PS)	Fabio Regazzi (CVP/PDC / The Centre)	Rocco Cattaneo (FDP/PLR)	Marco Romano (CVP/PDC)	Bruno Marchesi (SVP/UDC)	Alex Farinelli (FDP.The Liberals)
2023	Greta Gysin (GP/PV)	Lorenzo Quadri (Lega)	Bruno Storni (SP/PS)	Fabio Regazzi (CVP/PDC / The Centre)	Simone Gianini (FDP/PLR)	Paolo Pamini (SVP/UDC)	Piero Marchesi (SVP/UDC)	Alex Farinelli (FDP.The Liberals)
