= Joseph Girard (Swiss politician) =

Swiss politician

Joseph Girard (French pronunciation: [ʒozɛf ʒiʁaʁ]; 9 October 1815 – 25 June 1890) was a Swiss lawyer and politician. He was a member of the National Council (1848–1851) and represented the Canton of Geneva on the Staatsrat (1851–1853) and the Council of States (1853–1854 and 1856–1860).

== Life ==
The son of a businessman, he was born in Carouge and studied law from 1835 onwards at the University of Geneva, graduating and starting to practice five years later. He became noted for his speeches and his radical-liberal views and after the 1846 Liberal Revolution he became an active politician. He successfully stood for the first National Council at the 1848 federal election. In 1850 Girard joined the Grand Council of Geneva, which in turn elected him to the Staatsrat in 1851, upon which he resigned from the National Council. He was responsible for policing and justice and frequently came into conflict with James Fazy.

After two years Girard resigned to become a judge in the Court of Cassation. He represented Geneva on the Council of States from 1853 to 1854 and from 1856 to 1860. He also worked as an investigating judge from 1856 onwards, but in 1873 had to resign from all his posts due to illness. He later moved to Nyon, where he died. He left all his wealth and estate to his birthplace of Carouge, which now has a street named after him
