= Giusep Nay =

Giusep Nay (born 9 August 1942 in Trun, Grisons) was the president of the Federal Supreme Court of Switzerland for 2005 and 2006; he resigned in 2006.

Nay was elected to the Supreme Court in 1988 after being nominated by the Christian Democratic People's Party of Switzerland. Nay, former MP Lili Nabholz and law professor Giorgio Malinverni were nominated by the Swiss government to succeed Luzius Wildhaber in 2007 as the Swiss judge at the European Court of Human Rights; Malinverni was elected.
