= Gilbert Kolly =

Gilbert Kolly (born 25 October 1951) is a Swiss judge and President of the Federal Supreme Court of Switzerland since 2012.

== Works ==
- Gilbert Kolly (2004). Le pourvoi en nullité à la Cour de cassation pénale du Tribunal fédéral. Un aperçu de la pratique (in French). Bern: Stämpfli. ISBN 978-3-7272-9440-2.
- Gilbert Kolly (1978). Der Grundlagenirrtum nach Art. 24 OR: Rechtsprechung des Bundesgerichts (in German). Zürich: Juris Druck + Verlag. ISBN 978-3260044038.
