= Wilhelm Vigier =

Swiss politician (1823–1886)

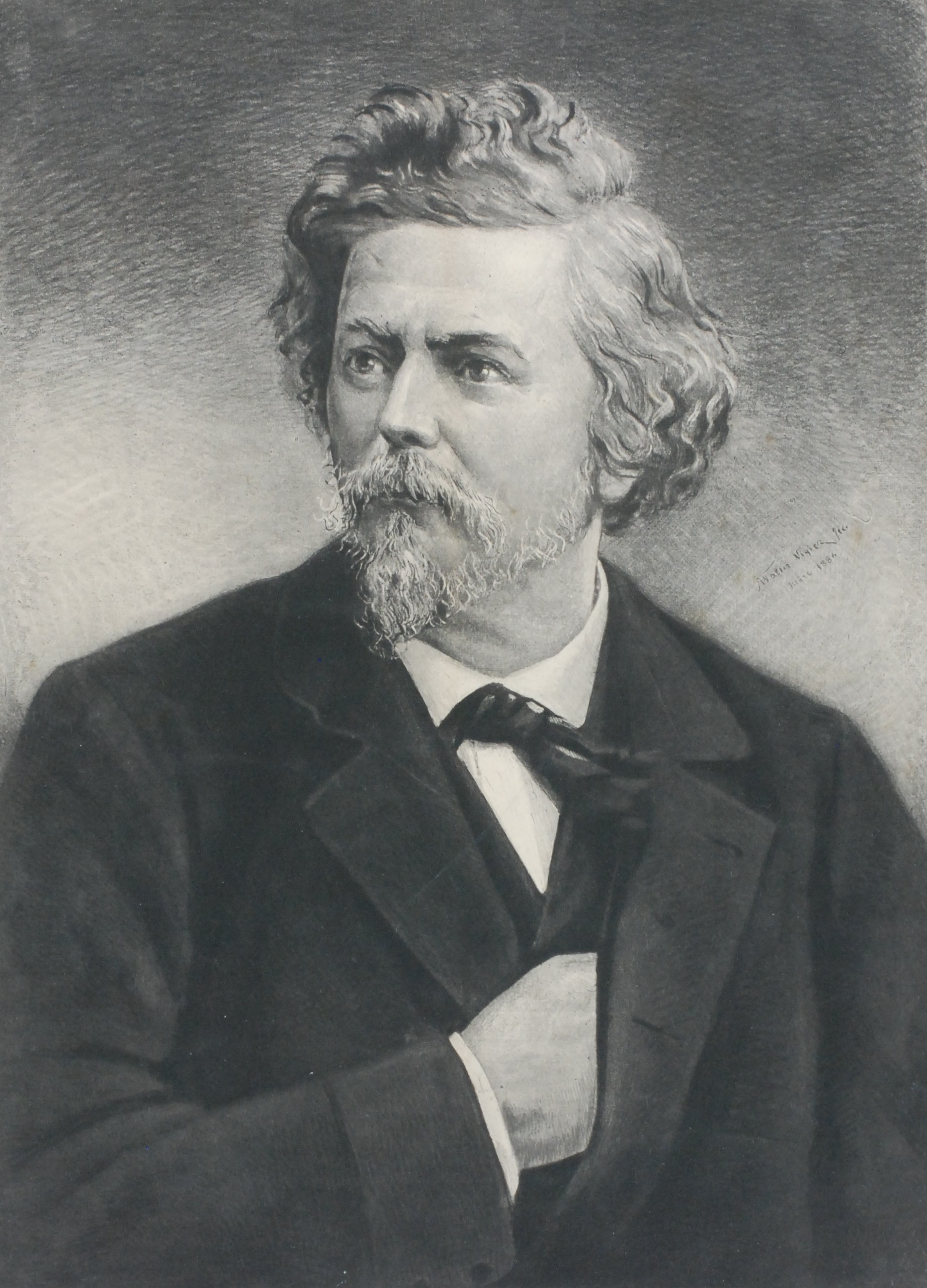
Vigier in 1886

Josef Wilhelm Viktor Vigier (27 August 1823 in Solothurn – 18 March 1886) was a Swiss politician and President of the Swiss Council of States (1862/1863 and 1882/1883).

Vigier was also a judge of the Federal Supreme Court of Switzerland (1858–1874). He presided over the court in 1864 and 1873.

He was an uncle of the national councilor and mayor of Solothurn Wilhelm Vigier (1839–1908).

Preceded by Nicolaus Hermann	President of the Council of States; 1862/1863	Succeeded by Eduard Häberlin
Preceded by Auguste Cornaz	President of the Council of States; 1882/1883	Succeeded by Walter Hauser
