= Louis Wenger =

Swiss architect and politician

Councillor of States
- In office July 2, 1855 – August 11, 1861

National Councillor
- In office December 1, 1851 – May 1, 1854

Councillor of States
- In office November 6, 1848 – March 1, 1849

Deputy to the Grand Council of Vaud

Personal details
- Born: Jean-Pierre-Louis Wenger; 31 May 1809 Lausanne
- Died: September 11, 1861 (aged 52) La Vaux, commune of Aubonne
- Party: Free Democratic Party of Switzerland
- Occupation: Architect

Jean-Pierre-Louis Wenger (31 May 1809 in Lausanne – 11 August 1861 in La Vaux, commune of Aubonne) was a Swiss architect and politician from the canton of Vaud.

== Biography ==
At the age of 15, Wenger started training in the workshop of architect Henri Perregaux of Lausanne. He subsequently stayed in Paris in 1827–30, where he attended courses at the École nationale supérieure des Beaux-Arts under the supervision of Achille Leclère. Upon his return to Switzerland, he started a political career and was a Radical Democratic deputy in the Grand Council of Vaud which he chaired six times between 1846 and 1861. He was a member of the city council of Lausanne from 1842 to 1843 and from 1848 to 1854. Moreover, Wenger sat in the Council of States from 1848 to 1849, then in the National Council from 1851 to 1854 and again in the Council of States from 1855 until his death in 1861. He became a colonel of the Swiss Army.

As an architect, Wenger restored several important monuments such as the Chapel of St. Anthony, La Sarraz, the Reformed Church of Our Lady, Orny, and the rose of the Cathedral of Lausanne. However, Wenger was mainly a building architect. He designed churches in Le Brassus and Chavannes-le-Veyron. He may have built the church of Bussigny, but archive sources rather attribute this work to surveyor Samuel Cupelin and architect David Braillard.

Wenger also designed buildings for the Army and justice such as the first barracks of Bière and the women's prison in Lausanne. His works on healthcare buildings include the Asile des aveugles (Asylum for the blind) and the uncompleted project of a psychiatric hospital. Moreover, Wenger designed schools in Assens, Renens, Pompaples and Saint-Saphorin. His public buildings include the Arlaud Museum in Lausanne, the clock towers of Aubonne and Lutry, the bell tower of the temple of Prangins, the city hall and communal inn of Cully, the former customs station of Lausanne and the communal inn of Gimel.

Wenger was known for his Neoclassical architecture with eclectic elements.

== Bibliography ==
- Paul Bissegger: "Wenger, Louis" in German, French and Italian in the online Historical Dictionary of Switzerland, October 7, 2013.
- Bissegger, Paul (2007). D'ivoire et de marbre. Alexandre et Henri Perregaux ou l'Age d'Or de l'architecture vaudoise (1770-1850). Bibliothèque historique vaudoise 131 (in French). Bibliothèque historique vaudoise. pp. 588–590. ISBN 978-2-88454-131-2.
- Rucki, Isabelle; Huber, Dorothee, eds. (1998). Architektenlexikon der Schweiz 19./20. Jahrhundert (in German). Birkhäuser Verlag. p. 566. ISBN 3-7643-5261-2.
