= Vera Rottenberg Liatowitsch =

Swiss judge

Vera Rottenberg Liatowitsch, née Vera Rottenberg (born 15 August 1944) is a Swiss retired judge. She served on the Swiss Federal Supreme Court from 1994 to 2012 and was the second woman elected to the country's highest court.

== Life ==
Vera Rottenberg was born on 15 August 1944 in Budapest to a Jewish family.

Her Swiss mother Berta Passweg had lost her Swiss citizenship upon marrying the Hungarian Wilhelm Rottenberg. With the aid of the Swiss representative Harald Feller, she managed to legally leave Budapest in October 1944 via Vienna with her two daughters Eva and Vera, and to return to St. Gallen, Switzerland, where she managed to restore her citizenship. Vera Rottenberg's father survived the war and joined his family in Switzerland in 1946. Her sister Eva Koralnik-Rottenberg became a literary agent.

=== Education ===
Vera Rottenberg attended school in St. Gallen, and studied law at the University of Zürich, graduating in 1973 with a doctorate. In 1975, she was admitted to the bar. In 1980, she obtained a Master of Laws at New York University.

=== Career ===
From 1973 to 1978 Rottenberg served as a clerk at the district court and the court of appeals of Zürich. In 1978 she was appointed substitute judge at the district court, and in 1981 she was elected judge proper at that court. In 1990 she was elected to the court of appeals, where she was the second female judge and for some time the only one.

On 15 June 1994 the Swiss Federal Assembly elected her to the Federal Supreme Court, from which she retired in December 2012. She replaced Margrith Bigler-Eggenberger, the first female Supreme Court judge elected in 1974.

== Other activities ==
Rottenberg has been a member of the Social Democratic Party of Switzerland since 1978.

She is a member of the board of governors of the International Association of Jewish Lawyers and Jurists, and was a member of the board of the consultation center for support of Holocaust survivors and their families (Tamach) until it closed in 2014.

== Publications ==
- (in German) „Zum Richterbild in der Schweiz“ in: Richterbild heute - Anspruch und Wirklichkeit, Schriftenreihe des Bundesministeriums für Justiz, Wien 1994
- (in German) Der bedingte Strafvollzug
- (in German) Der neue schweizerische Zivilprozess aus höchstrichterlicher Sicht - Schlaglichter / Vera Rottenberg Liatowitsch. – In: Schweizerische Zeitschrift für Zivilprozessrecht. – Basel (p. 59)
- (in German) Rottenberg Vera (1944-). Dokumentensammlung
