= Friedrich Siegfried =

Swiss politician

Samuel Friedrich Siegfried (7 October 1809, in Zofingen – 31 October 1882) was a Swiss politician and President of the Swiss National Council (1856).

Preceded by Eduard Blösch	President of the National Council; 1856	Succeeded by Jules Martin
