= Jean-François Egli =

Swiss judge (1928–2023)

President of the Swiss Federal Supreme Court
- In office 1992–1993

Judge of the Swiss Federal Supreme Court
- In office 1979–1996

Judge of the Cantonal Court of Neuchâtel
- In office 1965–1979

President of the District Court of La Chaux-de-Fonds
- In office 1958–1965

Personal details
- Born: 18 November 1928 Bôle, Neuchâtel, Switzerland
- Died: 6 November 2023 (aged 94)
- Party: Radical-Democratic Party
- Spouse: Christiane Delflasse (m. 1955)
- Parent: Henri Egli
- Education: University of Neuchâtel
- Profession: Jurist

Jean-François Egli (18 November 1928 – 6 November 2023) was a Swiss judge who served on the Swiss Federal Supreme Court from 1979 to 1996, including as its president from 1992 to 1993. He was a member of the Radical-Democratic Party (FDP).

== Early life and education ==
Egli was born on 18 November 1928 in Bôle, in the Canton of Neuchâtel. He was the son of Henri Egli, a doctor in chemistry, and held citizenship of Fischenthal and Bôle. He was Protestant.

Egli pursued his studies at the University of Neuchâtel, where he obtained a licentiate in law in 1951 and a licentiate in commercial sciences in 1952. He received his lawyer's certificate in 1954.

== Judicial career ==
Egli began his judicial career in the cantonal courts of Neuchâtel. He served as president of the district court of La Chaux-de-Fonds from 1958 to 1965, and then as a judge on the cantonal court of Neuchâtel from 1965 to 1979.

In 1979, Egli was elected to the Swiss Federal Supreme Court, presented by the Radical-Democratic Party. He served in the First Division of Public Law and presided over the court from 1992 to 1993. He retired from the Federal Supreme Court in 1996.

Egli also served as a member of the administrative tribunal of the International Labour Organization (ILO).

== Recognition ==
The University of Neuchâtel awarded Egli an honorary doctorate.

== Personal life ==
In 1955, Egli married Christiane Delflasse, daughter of Achille Delflasse, a violinist.

Egli died on 6 November 2023.
