= Nicolaus Hermann =

Swiss politician (1818–1888)

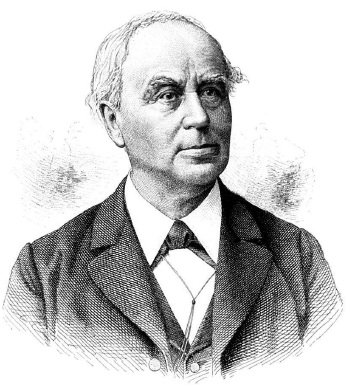
Portrait of Nicolaus Hermann

Nicolaus Hermann (21 October 1818, Sachseln – 4 August 1888) was a Swiss politician and President of the Swiss Council of States (1861/1862).

Preceded by Johann Jakob Blumer	President of the Council of States; 1861/1862	Succeeded by Wilhelm Vigier
