= Jules Martin =

Swiss politician

Jules Martin (27 February 1824, in Vevey – 21 May 1875) was a Swiss politician and president of the Swiss National Council (1856).

| Preceded by Friedrich Siegfried | President of the National Council; 1856 | Succeeded by Alfred Escher |
