= Victor Ruffy =

Swiss politician (1823–1869)

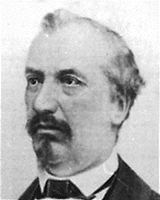
Victor Ruffy

Victor Ruffy (18 January 1823 in Lutry – 29 December 1869) was a Swiss politician elected to the Federal Council of Switzerland on 6 December 1867

He died in office on 29 December 1869, and was affiliated with the Free Democratic Party of Switzerland.

During his time in office he held the following departments:

- Department of Finance (1868)
- Military Department (1869)

His son Eugène Ruffy (1854–1919) was member of the Federal Council from 1893 to 1899.

Preceded by Joachim Heer	President of the National Council; 1863/1864	Succeeded by Gottlieb Jäger
Preceded by Constant Fornerod	Member of the Swiss Federal Council; 1867–1869	Succeeded by Paul Cérésole
