= Friedrich Peyer im Hof =

Swiss politician (1817–1900)

Johann Friedrich Peyer im Hof (18 June 1817 in Schaffhausen – 18 May 1900) was a Swiss politician member of the Swiss National Council during 1857–1875 (President 1859/1860). Alongside Alfred Escher, he is one of the main pioneers of rail transport in Switzerland.

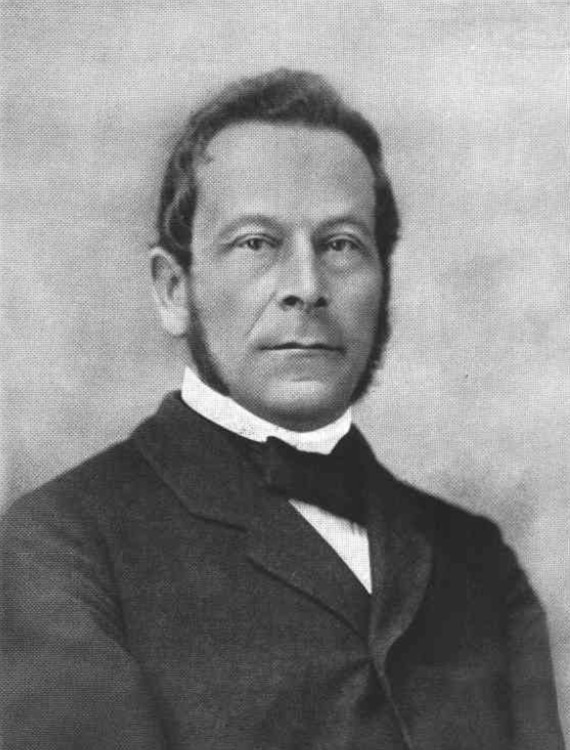
Friedrich Peyer Portrait

Peyer inherited his father's textile company in 1838. He was an early proponent of steam power in Switzerland, co-founder of Schaffhauser Eisenbahnvereins (1842) and of the Dampfboot-AG steamboat company (1851). He was co-founder of Waggonfabrik Neuhausen (from 1862 Schweizerische Industrie Gesellschaft) in 1853, and co-director of the Nordostbahn railway company during 1857–1877. He co-founded Schaffhausen Bank in 1863, and Handelsbank Schaffhausen in 1873. Besides his office as National Councillor, he served in the Schaffhausen city council during 1843–1845, 1851–1869, and 1871–1875.

Peyer was significantly affected by the financial crisis that hit Nordostbahn in the early 1870s. At the same time, his speculative investments in Hungary met with failure, so that he was forced to retire from all offices in 1877.

Preceded by Johann Jakob Stehlin	President of the National Council; 1859/1860	Succeeded by Johann Baptist Weder
