= Johann Konrad Kern =

Swiss statesman

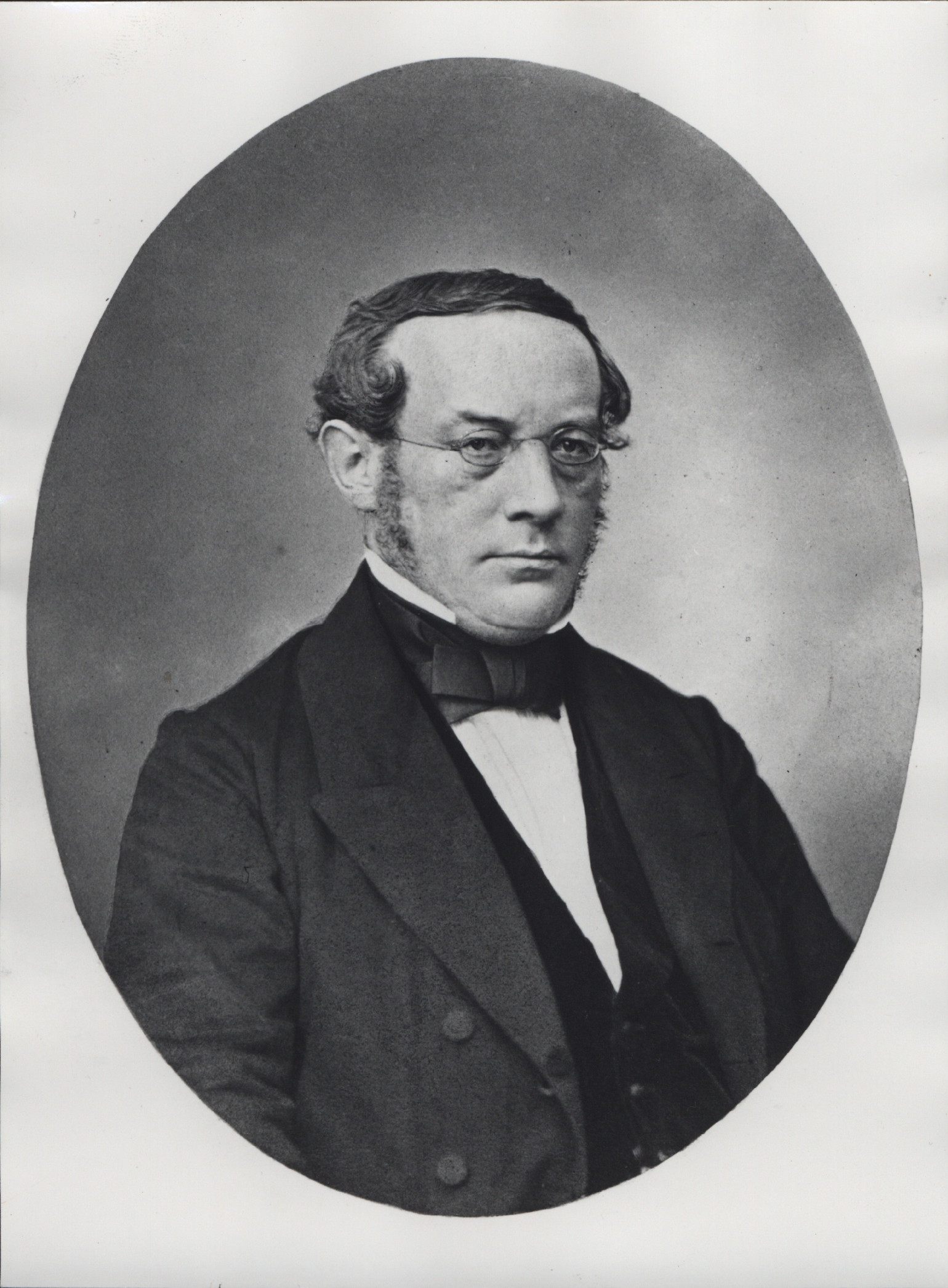
Johann Konrad Kern c. 1855

Johann Konrad Kern (11 June 1808 – 14 April 1888) was a Swiss statesman. He was the first president of the Federal Supreme Court (1848–1850) and president of the National Council in 1850–1851. Kernstrasse in Zürich is named for him.

== Early life ==
Kern was born into a wealthy family in 1808 in Berlingen in the Swiss canton of Thurgau. He attended school at Diessenhofen and Zürich before enrolling at the University of Basel in 1828, where he studied theology briefly before transferring to Heidelberg University to study law. He graduated with honours in 1830 and began practicing law in Berlingen in 1831.

== Political career ==
Kern married Aline Freyenmuth in 1834, with whom he then relocated to Frauenfeld, Thurgau's capital. Freyenmuth was the daughter of a cantonal government councillor, which led Kern to become involved in Thurgau's political sphere. Kern would serve as a member of the Grand Council of Thurgau from 1832 until 1853, including nine terms as president, during which time he helped to revise the canton's constitution, authored its criminal code, and sat on the education committee.

Kern represented Thurgau at the Tagsatzung, the federal council of delegates from each canton, in 1833–38, 1840–42, and 1845–48. In 1848 he was elected to the National Council and held the presidency in 1850–1851, leaving the assembly in 1854; during this time he also served as a federal judge in the Federal Supreme Court, where he was president in 1848–1850. He was a major contributor to the writing of the new Swiss Constitution in 1848, the country's first federal constitution, and in 1854 he helped to establish the federal technical university Eidgenössische Polytechnische Schule (now ETH Zurich). From 1853 to 1857, he was also the director of the Swiss Northeastern Railway company.

Kern declined an 1849 appointment to a Swiss ambassadorship in Vienna, but later represented Switzerland internationally. In 1856 he was sent to Paris to partake in the mediation of the Neuchâtel Crisis with Napoleon III, and the next year he took up a formal post as Minister of Switzerland in Paris. During this time, he failed to mediate in the 1870–71 Franco-Prussian War, but provided assistance to Swiss nationals living in war-torn France. He resigned in 1882.

== Later years ==
After his retirement, Kern moved to Paris between 1883 and 1886 to write a memoir of his 50-year political career titled Politische Erinnerungen 1833 bis 1883 (Political Reminiscences 1833 to 1883). He then returned to Zürich, where he died in 1888 after having a stroke.

Preceded by Alfred Escher	President of the National Council; 1850/1851	Succeeded by Jakob Stämpfli
