= Gottlieb Jäger =

Swiss politician

Gottlieb Jäger (28 December 1805 in Aarau – 25 April 1891) was a Swiss politician, President of the Federal Supreme Court (1860) and President of the Swiss National Council (1864/1865).

== Biography ==
Gottlieb Jäger was born in Aarau on 28 December 1805, the son of the district court clerk Johann Samuel Jäger. Jäger studied law in Basel, Jena and Heidelberg from 1825. In 1829, he was appointed notary public. Two years later he was admitted as an advocate. From 1832 to 1833 he acted as government secretary. He then undertook a three-year trip to America and returned to Switzerland in 1836, where he continued to work as an advocate in Brugg. In 1848, he served as a member of the Federal Constitutional Commission. From 1849 to 1856 he served as a substitute justice of the federal court, then as a part-time federal judge between 1856 and 1874, and as president of the federal court in 1860. In addition, in 1845 he led the negotiations in Lucerne for the ransom of the Freischar. Jäger is considered one of the leading jurists in Switzerland of his time.

Gottlieb Jäger, citizen of Brugg who married Sophie (née Siebenmann) in 1837, died in Brugg on 25 April 1891, at the age of 85.

== Political career ==
Jäger served as mayor of Brugg from 1838 to 1858. From 1832 to 1834 and from 1837 to 1862, he was a member of the Grand Council of Aargau. He was also a member of the Constitutional Court from 1849 to 1852. In addition, he was a member of the National Council from 1848 to 1851 and from 1854 to 1866, including as president from 1864 to 1865. Jäger, who initially belonged to the radical school of thought, later became moderately liberal.

| Preceded by Victor Ruffy | President of the National Council; 1864/1865 | Succeeded by Andreas Rudolf von Planta |
