= Eduard Blösch =

Swiss politician

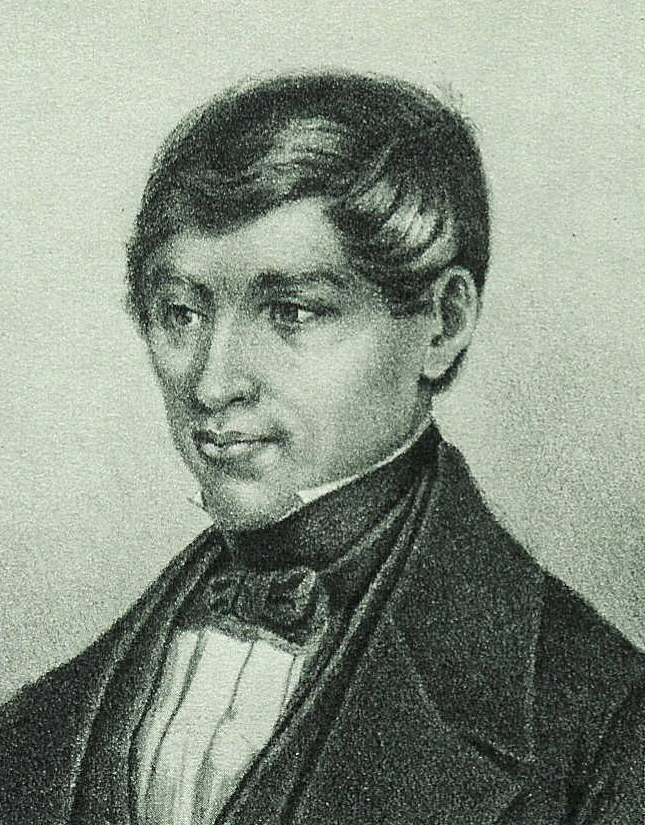
- Eduard Blösch (year unknown)
- Born: February 1, 1807
- Died: February 7, 1866 (aged 59)

Eduard Eugen Blösch (1 February 1807, in Biel/Bienne – 7 February 1866) was a Swiss politician, President of the Federal Supreme Court (1855 and 1863) and President of the Swiss National Council (1855/1856).

Preceded by Casimir Pfyffer	President of the National Council; 1855/1856	Succeeded by Friedrich Siegfried
