= Karl Karrer =

Swiss politician

Karl Karrer (22 March 1815 – 18 April 1886) was a Swiss politician and President of the Swiss National Council (1861/1862).

Preceded by Eduard Dapples	President of the National Council; 1861/1862	Succeeded by Alfred Escher
