= Eduard Häberlin =

Swiss politician

K. Eduard Häberlin (8 March 1820, Bissegg – 14 February 1884) was a Swiss politician and President of the Swiss Council of States (1863).

His brother Friedrich Heinrich Häberlin (1834–1897) eventually became President of the Swiss National Council (1889/1890). Heinrich Häberlin (1868–1947) was his nephew.

Preceded by Wilhelm Vigier	President of the Council of States; 1863	Succeeded by Karl Schenk
