= Johann Matthias Hungerbühler =

Swiss politician

Johann Matthias Hungerbühler (2 September 1805, in Wittenbach – 14 July 1884) was a Swiss politician and President of the Swiss National Council (1852/1853).

Preceded by Johann Jakob Trog	President of the National Council; 1852/1853	Succeeded by Giovanni Battista Pioda
