= Andreas Rudolf von Planta =

Swiss politician

Andreas Rudolf von Planta (24 April 1819 in Samedan – 19 April 1889) was a Swiss politician and President of the Swiss National Council (1865/1866).

Preceded by Gottlieb Jäger	President of the National Council; 1865/1866	Succeeded by Niklaus Niggeler
