= Johann Jakob Trog =

Swiss politician (1807–1867)

Johann Jakob Trog (21 April 1807 – 7 January 1867) was a Swiss politician and President of the Swiss National Council (1851/1852). He sat in the National Council as a representative of the Canton of Solothurn. He was affiliated with the Liberal Centre, which later developed into the Liberal Party of Switzerland.

== Works ==
- Trog, Johann Jakob (1853). Johann Baptist Reinert: Rede des Präsidenten Trog bei Eröffnung der Kantonsrats-Versammlung vom 23. Mai 1853 (in German).

| Preceded by Jakob Stämpfli | President of the National Council; 1851/1852 | Succeeded by Johann Matthias Hungerbühler |
