= Casimir Pfyffer =

Swiss politician and jurist

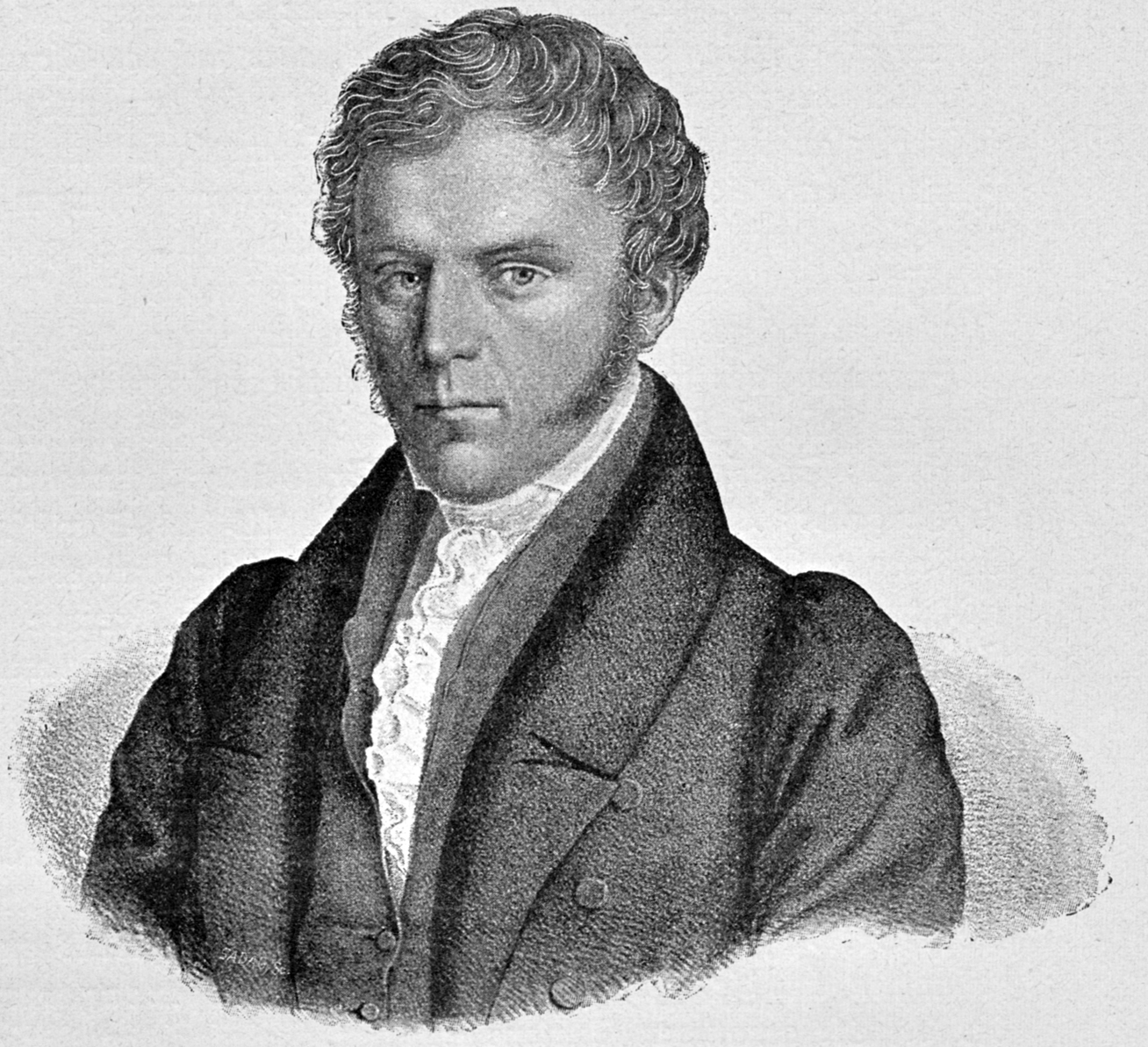
Pfyffer (ca. 1850)

Casimir Pfyffer von Altishofen (10 October 1794 in Rome – 11 November 1875) was a Swiss politician and jurist. He was mayor of Lucerne (1832–1835), President of the Swiss National Council (1854/1855) and five times President of the Federal Supreme Court.

Kasimir-Pfyffer-Strasse in Lucerne is named for him.

== Works ==
- Pfyffer, Kasimir (1850). Geschichte der Stadt und des Kantons Luzern: Vom Ursprunge bis zur Staatsumwälzung im Jahr 1798 (in German). Zürich: Orell, Füssli & Co.
- Pfyffer, Kasimir (1852). Geschichte der Stadt und des Kantons Luzern: Geschichte des Kantons Luzern während der letzten 50 Jahre: Staatsumwälzung im Jahr 1798 bis zur neuen Bundesverfassung im Jahr 1848 (in German). Zürich: Orell, Füssli.
- Der Kanton Luzern historisch-geographisch-statistisch geschildert; ein Hand- und Hausbuch für Jedermann. 2 volumes, St. Gallen: Huber 1858/59.

Preceded by Jakob Dubs	President of the National Council; 1854/1855	Succeeded by Eduard Eugen Blösch
