= List of members of the Federal Assembly from the Canton of Schwyz =

Coat of Arms

This is a list of members of both houses of the Federal Assembly from the Canton of Schwyz.

== Members of the Council of States ==
Councillor (Party)	Election	Councillor (Party)
Kaspar L. Krieg; Conservative; 1848–1849	Appointed	Karl von Schorno; Conservative; 1848–1852
Franz Anton Oetiker; Conservative; 1849–1850	Appointed	Karl von Schorno; Conservative; 1848–1852
Kaspar L. Krieg; Conservative; 1850–1852	Appointed	Karl von Schorno; Conservative; 1848–1852
Jos. Meinrad Benedikt Düggelin; Conservative; 1853–1858	Appointed	Nazar von Reding; Party unknown 1853–1854
Jos. Meinrad Benedikt Düggelin; Conservative; 1853–1858	Appointed	F. Xaver J. K. Auf der Mauer; Conservative; 1854–1861
Johann Anton Steinegger; Conservative; 1858–1867	Appointed	F. Xaver J. K. Auf der Mauer; Conservative; 1854–1861
Johann Anton Steinegger; Conservative; 1858–1867	Appointed	Joseph M. von Hettlingen; Conservative; 1862–1873
Johann Michael Stählin; Conservative; 1867–1872	Appointed	Joseph M. von Hettlingen; Conservative; 1862–1873
Marianus Theiler; Conservative; 1872–1885	Appointed	Joseph M. von Hettlingen; Conservative; 1862–1873
Marianus Theiler; Conservative; 1872–1885	Appointed	Karl Reichlin; Conservative; 1873–1874
Marianus Theiler; Conservative; 1872–1885	Appointed	Joseph M. von Hettlingen; Conservative; 1874–1887
Karl Kümin; Conservative; 1885–1905	Appointed	Joseph M. von Hettlingen; Conservative; 1874–1887
Karl Kümin; Conservative; 1885–1905	Appointed	Karl Reichlin; Conservative; 1887–1905
Nikolaus Benziger; Conservative; 1905–1908	Appointed	Rudolf von Reding; Conservative; 1905–1911
Martin Ochsner; Conservative; 1908–1939	Appointed	Rudolf von Reding; Conservative; 1905–1911
Martin Ochsner; Conservative; 1908–1939	Appointed	Josef-Maria Schuler; Free Democratic Party; 1911–1915
Martin Ochsner; Conservative; 1908–1939	Appointed	Joseph Räber; Conservative; 1915–1928
Martin Ochsner; Conservative; 1908–1939	1919	Joseph Räber; Conservative; 1915–1928
Martin Ochsner; Conservative; 1908–1939	1922	Joseph Räber; Conservative; 1915–1928
Martin Ochsner; Conservative; 1908–1939	1925	Joseph Räber; Conservative; 1915–1928
Martin Ochsner; Conservative; 1908–1939	1928	Adolf Suter; Conservative; 1928–1947
Martin Ochsner; Conservative; 1908–1939	1931	Adolf Suter; Conservative; 1928–1947
Martin Ochsner; Conservative; 1908–1939	1935	Adolf Suter; Conservative; 1928–1947
Fritz Stähli; Conservative; 1939–1959	1939	Adolf Suter; Conservative; 1928–1947
Fritz Stähli; Conservative; 1939–1959	1943	Adolf Suter; Conservative; 1928–1947
Fritz Stähli; Conservative; 1939–1959	1947	Anton Gwerder; Conservative; 1947–1949
Fritz Stähli; Conservative; 1939–1959	1950	Dominik Auf der Maur; Conservative; 1950–1967
Fritz Stähli; Conservative; 1939–1959	1951	Dominik Auf der Maur; Conservative; 1950–1967
Fritz Stähli; Conservative; 1939–1959	1955	Dominik Auf der Maur; Conservative; 1950–1967
Heinrich Oechslin; Christian Social Conservative Party; 1959–1975	1959	Dominik Auf der Maur; Conservative; 1950–1967
Heinrich Oechslin; Christian Social Conservative Party; 1959–1975	1963	Dominik Auf der Maur; Conservative; 1950–1967
Heinrich Oechslin; Christian Social Conservative Party; 1959–1975	1967	Josef Ulrich; Christian Social Conservative Party; 1967–1983
Heinrich Oechslin; Christian Social Conservative Party; 1959–1975	1971	Josef Ulrich; Christian Social Conservative Party; 1967–1983
Alois Dobler; Christian Democratic People's Party; 1975–1991	1975	Josef Ulrich; Christian Social Conservative Party; 1967–1983
Alois Dobler; Christian Democratic People's Party; 1975–1991	1979	Josef Ulrich; Christian Social Conservative Party; 1967–1983
Alois Dobler; Christian Democratic People's Party; 1975–1991	1983	Xaver Reichmuth; Christian Democratic People's Party; 1983–1991
Alois Dobler; Christian Democratic People's Party; 1975–1991	1987	Xaver Reichmuth; Christian Democratic People's Party; 1983–1991
Hans Bisig; Free Democratic Party; 1991–1999	1991	Bruno Frick; Christian Democratic People's Party; 1991–2011
Hans Bisig; Free Democratic Party; 1991–1999	1995	Bruno Frick; Christian Democratic People's Party; 1991–2011
Toni Dettling; Free Democratic Party; 1999–2003	1999	Bruno Frick; Christian Democratic People's Party; 1991–2011
Alex Kuprecht; Swiss People's Party; 2003–2023	2003	Bruno Frick; Christian Democratic People's Party; 1991–2011
Alex Kuprecht; Swiss People's Party; 2003–2023	2007	Bruno Frick; Christian Democratic People's Party; 1991–2011
Alex Kuprecht; Swiss People's Party; 2003–2023	2011	Peter Föhn; Swiss People's Party; 2011–2019
Alex Kuprecht; Swiss People's Party; 2003–2023	2015	Peter Föhn; Swiss People's Party; 2011–2019
Alex Kuprecht; Swiss People's Party; 2003–2023	2019	Othmar Reichmuth; Christian Democratic People's Party; 2019-2023
Pirmin Schwander; Swiss People's Party; 2023–present	2023	Petra Gössi; FDP.The Liberals; 2023-present

== Members of the National Council ==
Election	Councillor (Party)	Councillor (Party)	Councillor (Party)	Councillor (Party)
1848	Fr. Karl Schuler (Conservative)	Johann Anton Steinegger (Conservative)	2 seats 1848–1881	
1851	Fr. Karl Schuler (Conservative)	Johann Anton Steinegger (Conservative)	2 seats 1848–1881	
1852	Karl Styger (Conservative)	Johann Anton Steinegger (Conservative)	2 seats 1848–1881	
1854	Karl Styger (Conservative)	Meinrad Jb. Hegner (Liberal)	2 seats 1848–1881	
1857	Karl Styger (Conservative)	Jos. Anton G. Büeler (Conservative)	2 seats 1848–1881	
1860	Karl Styger (Conservative)	Jos. Anton G. Büeler (Conservative)	2 seats 1848–1881	
1863	Karl Styger (Conservative)	Josef Karl Benziger (Conservative)	2 seats 1848–1881	
1866	Karl Styger (Conservative)	Josef Anton Eberle (Liberal)	2 seats 1848–1881	
1869	Karl Styger (Conservative)	Josef Anton Eberle (Liberal)	2 seats 1848–1881	
1872	Fridolin Holdener (Conservative)	Johann Michael Stählin (Conservative)	2 seats 1848–1881	
1874	Fridolin Holdener (Conservative)	Ambros Eberle (Conservative)	2 seats 1848–1881	
1875	Fridolin Holdener (Conservative)	Ambros Eberle (Conservative)	2 seats 1848–1881	
1878	Fridolin Holdener (Conservative)	Ambros Eberle (Conservative)	2 seats 1848–1881	
1881	Fridolin Holdener (Conservative)	Ambros Eberle (Conservative)	Vital sen. Schwander (Conservative)	3 seats 1881–2003
1883	Fridolin Holdener (Conservative)	Nikolaus Benziger (Conservative)	Vital sen. Schwander (Conservative)	3 seats 1881–2003
1884	Fridolin Holdener (Conservative)	Nikolaus Benziger (Conservative)	Vital sen. Schwander (Conservative)	3 seats 1881–2003
1887	Fridolin Holdener (Conservative)	Nikolaus Benziger (Conservative)	Vital sen. Schwander (Conservative)	3 seats 1881–2003
1890	Fridolin Holdener (Conservative)	Nikolaus Benziger (Conservative)	Vital sen. Schwander (Conservative)	3 seats 1881–2003
1893	Fridolin Holdener (Conservative)	Nikolaus Benziger (Conservative)	Vital sen. Schwander (Conservative)	3 seats 1881–2003
1896	Jos. Ferd. Anton Büeler (Conservative)	Nikolaus Benziger (Conservative)	Vital sen. Schwander (Conservative)	3 seats 1881–2003
1899	Jos. Ferd. Anton Büeler (Conservative)	Nikolaus Benziger (Conservative)	Vital sen. Schwander (Conservative)	3 seats 1881–2003
1902	Jos. Ferd. Anton Büeler (Conservative)	Nikolaus Benziger (Conservative)	Vital sen. Schwander (Conservative)	3 seats 1881–2003
1905	Jos. Ferd. Anton Büeler (Conservative)	L. Kaspar Knobel (FDP/PRD)	Vital sen. Schwander (Conservative)	3 seats 1881–2003
1908	Jos. Ferd. Anton Büeler (Conservative)	L. Kaspar Knobel (FDP/PRD)	Anton von Hettlingen (Conservative)	3 seats 1881–2003
1910	Jos. Ferd. Anton Büeler (Conservative)	Martin Steinegger (FDP/PRD)	Anton von Hettlingen (Conservative)	3 seats 1881–2003
1911	Jos. Ferd. Anton Büeler (Conservative)	Martin Steinegger (FDP/PRD)	Anton von Hettlingen (Conservative)	3 seats 1881–2003
1914	Jos. Ferd. Anton Büeler (Conservative)	Martin Steinegger (FDP/PRD)	Anton von Hettlingen (Conservative)	3 seats 1881–2003
1917	Jos. Ferd. Anton Büeler (Conservative)	Martin Steinegger (FDP/PRD)	Anton von Hettlingen (Conservative)	3 seats 1881–2003
1919	Vital jun. Schwander (Conservative)	Josef Bürgi-Gretener (PAB)	Hans Steiner (Conservative)	3 seats 1881–2003
1922	Vital jun. Schwander (Conservative)	Josef Bürgi-Gretener (PAB)	Hans Steiner (Conservative)	3 seats 1881–2003
1925	Karl von Weber (Conservative)	Josef Bürgi-Gretener (PAB)	Johann Wattenhofer (SP/PS)	3 seats 1881–2003
1928	Karl von Weber (Conservative)	Alois Ab Yberg (FDP/PRD)	Fritz Stähli (Conservative)	3 seats 1881–2003
1931	Karl von Weber (Conservative)	Alois Ab Yberg (FDP/PRD)	Fritz Stähli (Conservative)	3 seats 1881–2003
1935	Karl von Weber (Conservative)	Erhard Ruoss (FDP/PRD)	Fritz Stähli (Conservative)	3 seats 1881–2003
1939	Karl von Weber (Conservative)	Erhard Ruoss (FDP/PRD)	Clemenz Ulrich (Conservative)	3 seats 1881–2003
1943	Kaspar Knobel (Conservative)	Erhard Ruoss (FDP/PRD)	Josef Schuler (BV (SZ)*)	3 seats 1881–2003
1947	Kaspar Knobel (Conservative)	Erhard Ruoss (FDP/PRD)	Josef Heinzer (SP/PS)	3 seats 1881–2003
1951	Kaspar Knobel (Conservative)	Hans Fuchs (Conservative)	Josef Heinzer (SP/PS)	3 seats 1881–2003
1953	Josef Ulrich (Conservative)	Hans Fuchs (Conservative)	Josef Heinzer (SP/PS)	3 seats 1881–2003
1955	Armin Bruhin (FDP/PRD)	Hans Fuchs (Conservative)	Josef Heinzer (SP/PS)	3 seats 1881–2003
1959	Karl Bachmann (CCS)	Hans Fuchs (Conservative)	Josef Diethelm (SP/PS)	3 seats 1881–2003
1963	Karl Bachmann (CCS)	Hans Fuchs (Conservative)	Josef Diethelm (SP/PS)	3 seats 1881–2003
1967	Karl Bachmann (CCS)	Joachim Weber (FDP/PRD)	Josef Diethelm (SP/PS)	3 seats 1881–2003
1971	Elisabeth Blunschy-Steiner (CVP/PDC)	Joachim Weber (FDP/PRD)	Josef Diethelm (SP/PS)	3 seats 1881–2003
1975	Elisabeth Blunschy-Steiner (CVP/PDC)	Josef Risi (CVP/PDC)	Josef Diethelm (SP/PS)	3 seats 1881–2003
1979	Elisabeth Blunschy-Steiner (CVP/PDC)	Josef Risi (CVP/PDC)	Karl Weber (FDP/PRD)	3 seats 1881–2003
1983	Elisabeth Blunschy-Steiner (CVP/PDC)	Josef Risi (CVP/PDC)	Karl Weber (FDP/PRD)	3 seats 1881–2003
1987	Jakob Bürgi (CVP/PDC)	Arthur Züger (SP/PS)	Karl Weber (FDP/PRD)	3 seats 1881–2003
1991	Jakob Bürgi (CVP/PDC)	Arthur Züger (SP/PS)	Toni Dettling (FDP/PRD)	3 seats 1881–2003
1995	Toni Eberhard (CVP/PDC)	Peter Föhn (SVP/UDC)	Toni Dettling (FDP/PRD)	3 seats 1881–2003
1999	Toni Eberhard (CVP/PDC)	Peter Föhn (SVP/UDC)	Maya Lalive d'Épinay (FDP/PRD)	3 seats 1881–2003
2003	Reto Wehrli (CVP/PDC)	Peter Föhn (SVP/UDC)	Josy Gyr-Steiner (SP/PS)	Pirmin Schwander (SVP/UDC)
2007	Reto Wehrli (CVP/PDC)	Peter Föhn (SVP/UDC)	Andy Tschümperlin (SP/PS)	Pirmin Schwander (SVP/UDC)
2011	Alois Gmür (CVP/PDC)	Petra Gössi (FDP/PLR)	Andy Tschümperlin (SP/PS)	Pirmin Schwander (SVP/UDC)
2015	Alois Gmür (CVP/PDC)	Petra Gössi (FDP/PLR)	Marcel Dettling (SVP/UDC)	Pirmin Schwander (SVP/UDC)
2019	Alois Gmür (CVP/PDC)	Petra Gössi (FDP/PLR)	Marcel Dettling (SVP/UDC)	Pirmin Schwander (SVP/UDC)
2023	Dominik Blunshy (The Centre)	Petra Gössi (FDP/PLR)	Marcel Dettling (SVP/UDC)	Roman Bürgi (SVP/UDC)
