= List of members of the Federal Assembly from the Canton of Obwalden =

Coat of Arms

This is a list of members of both houses of the Federal Assembly from the Canton of Obwalden. As one of the cantons defined until 1999 as "half-cantons", Obwalden elects only one member to the Council of States

== Members of the Council of States ==
Election	Councillor (Party)
Appointed	Johann Imfeld; Conservative; 1848–1849
Appointed	Nicolaus Hermann; Conservative; 1849–1872
Appointed	Theodor Wirz; Conservative; 1872–1901
Appointed	Adalbert Wirz; Conservative; 1901–1925
Appointed	Walter Amstalden; Conservative; 1926–1943
1928	Walter Amstalden; Conservative; 1926–1943
1931	Walter Amstalden; Conservative; 1926–1943
1935	Walter Amstalden; Conservative; 1926–1943
1939	Walter Amstalden; Conservative; 1926–1943
1943	Ludwig von Moos; Conservative; 1943–1959
1947	Ludwig von Moos; Conservative; 1943–1959
1951	Ludwig von Moos; Conservative; 1943–1959
1955	Ludwig von Moos; Conservative; 1943–1959
1959	Ludwig von Moos; Conservative; 1943–1959
1960	Gotthard Odermatt; Christian Social Conservative Party; 1960–1970
1963	Gotthard Odermatt; Christian Social Conservative Party; 1960–1970
1967	Gotthard Odermatt; Christian Social Conservative Party; 1960–1970
1970	Jost Dillier; Christian Social Conservative Party; 1970–1982
1971	Jost Dillier; Christian Social Conservative Party; 1970–1982
1975	Jost Dillier; Christian Social Conservative Party; 1970–1982
1979	Jost Dillier; Christian Social Conservative Party; 1970–1982
1982	Wilfried Hophan; Christian Democratic People's Party; 1982–1986
1983	Wilfried Hophan; Christian Democratic People's Party; 1982–1986
1986	Niklaus Küchler; Christian Democratic People's Party; 1986–1998
1987	Niklaus Küchler; Christian Democratic People's Party; 1986–1998
1991	Niklaus Küchler; Christian Democratic People's Party; 1986–1998
1995	Niklaus Küchler; Christian Democratic People's Party; 1986–1998
1998	Hans Hess; Independent; 1998–2015
1999	Hans Hess; Independent; 1998–2015
2003	Hans Hess; Independent; 1998–2015
2007	Hans Hess; Independent; 1998–2015
2011	Hans Hess; Independent; 1998–2015
2015	Erich Ettlin; Christian Democratic People's Party; 2015–2023; The Centre; 2023–present
2019	Erich Ettlin; Christian Democratic People's Party; 2015–2023; The Centre; 2023–present
2023	Erich Ettlin; Christian Democratic People's Party; 2015–2023; The Centre; 2023–present

== Members of the National Council ==
Election	Councillor (Party)
1848	Franz Wirz (Conservative)
1851	Franz Wirz (Conservative)
1854	Franz Wirz (Conservative)
1857	Franz Wirz (Conservative)
1860	Franz Wirz (Conservative)
1863	Franz Wirz (Conservative)
1866	Simon Etlin (Conservative)
1869	Simon Etlin (Conservative)
1871	Theodor Wirz (Conservative)
1872	Alois Reinert (Conservative)
1875	Alois Reinert (Conservative)
1878	Nicolaus Hermann (Conservative)
1881	Nicolaus Hermann (Conservative)
1884	Nicolaus Hermann (Conservative)
1887	Nicolaus Hermann (Conservative)
1888	Nikolaus Durrer (Liberal)
1890	Peter Anton Ming (Conservative)
1893	Peter Anton Ming (Conservative)
1896	Peter Anton Ming (Conservative)
1899	Peter Anton Ming (Conservative)
1902	Peter Anton Ming (Conservative)
1905	Peter Anton Ming (Conservative)
1908	Peter Anton Ming (Conservative)
1911	Peter Anton Ming (Conservative)
1914	Peter Anton Ming (Conservative)
1917	Peter Anton Ming (Conservative)
1919	Peter Anton Ming (Conservative)
1922	Peter Anton Ming (Conservative)
1924	Maria Odermatt (Conservative)
1925	Maria Odermatt (Conservative)
1928	Maria Odermatt (Conservative)
1931	Maria Odermatt (Conservative)
1935	Maria Odermatt (Conservative)
1939	Maria Odermatt (Conservative)
1943	Gotthard Odermatt (Conservative)
1947	Gotthard Odermatt (Conservative)
1951	Hans Ming (Conservative)
1955	Hans Ming (Conservative)
1959	Hans Ming (Conservative)
1963	Hans Gasser (CCS)
1967	Hans Gasser (CCS)
1971	Walter Röthlin (CVP/PDC)
1975	Walter Röthlin (CVP/PDC)
1979	Walter Röthlin (CVP/PDC)
1983	Walter Röthlin (CVP/PDC)
1987	Ulrich Blatter (CVP/PDC)
1991	Ulrich Blatter (CVP/PDC)
1995	Adalbert Durrer (CVP/PDC)
1999	Adalbert Durrer (CVP/PDC)
2001	Adrian Imfeld (CVP/PDC)
2003	Adrian Imfeld (CVP/PDC)
2007	Christoph von Rotz (SVP/UDC)
2011	Karl Vogler (CSP OW)
2015	Karl Vogler (CSP OW)
2019	Monika Rüegger-Hurschler (SVP/UDC)
2023	Monika Rüegger-Hurschler (SVP/UDC)
