= Young Farmers (Switzerland) =

The Young Farmers (French: Jeunes Paysans, German: Jungbauern) was a political party in Switzerland.

== History ==
The party was established in 1935 by Hans Müller after his expulsion from the Party of Farmers, Traders and Independents (BGB), whose youth wing he had led since 1927. Müller had longstanding differences with the party's leadership over its economic policy, with the leadership calling for deflation and Müller calling for state intervention.

The new party won four seats in the October 1935 elections, and sat with the Social-Political Group in the National Council until 1941. It won three seats in the 1939 elections, and whilst it retained all three in the 1943 elections, the party was dissolved in 1946 when its members either rejoined the BGB or retired from politics.
