= 1951 Swiss federal election =

Federal elections were held in Switzerland on 28 October 1951. Although the Social Democratic Party received the most votes, the Free Democratic Party remained the largest party in the National Council, winning 51 of the 196 seats.

== Results ==
=== National Council ===
Party	Votes	%	Seats	+/–
Social Democratic Party	249,857	25.99	49	+1
Free Democratic Party	230,687	23.99	51	–1
Conservative People's Party	216,616	22.53	48	+4
Party of Farmers, Traders and Independents	120,819	12.57	23	+2
Alliance of Independents	49,100	5.11	10	+2
Swiss Party of Labour	25,659	2.67	5	–2
Liberal Democratic Party	24,813	2.58	5	–2
Social-Political Group	21,606	2.25	4	–1
Evangelical People's Party	9,559	0.99	1	0
Liberal Socialist Party	8,194	0.85	0	–1
Other parties	4,588	0.48	0	0
Total	961,498	100.00	196	+2
Valid votes	961,498	97.42		
Invalid/blank votes	25,439	2.58		
Total votes	986,937	100.00		
Registered voters/turnout	1,386,146	71.20		
Source: Mackie & Rose, Nohlen & Stöver

==== By constituency ====
Constituency	Seats	Electorate	Turnout	Party	Votes	Seats won
Aargau	13	89,544	76,963	Social Democratic Party	317,094	4
Aargau	13	89,544	76,963	Conservative People's Party	214,280	4
Aargau	13	89,544	76,963	Free Democratic Party	180,353	3
Aargau	13	89,544	76,963	Party of Farmers, Traders and Independents	149,273	2
Aargau	13	89,544	76,963	Ring of Independents	59,209	0
Aargau	13	89,544	76,963	Evangelical People's Party	33,971	0
Appenzell Ausserrhoden	2	14,218	9,784	Free Democratic Party	8,901	1
Appenzell Ausserrhoden	2	14,218	9,784	Social Democratic Party	5,480	1
Appenzell Ausserrhoden	2	14,218	9,784	Free Democratic People's List	2,777	0
Appenzell Innerrhoden	1	3,681	1,470	Conservative People's Party	1,167	1
Basel-Landschaft	4	32,813	21,935	Social Democratic Party	26,276	1
Basel-Landschaft	4	32,813	21,935	Free Democratic Party	15,128	1
Basel-Landschaft	4	32,813	21,935	Party of Farmers, Traders and Independents	13,090	1
Basel-Landschaft	4	32,813	21,935	Conservative People's Party	10,172	1
Basel-Landschaft	4	32,813	21,935	Social-Political Group	9,490	0
Basel-Landschaft	4	32,813	21,935	Aktion Kanton Basel	8,672	0
Basel-Landschaft	4	32,813	21,935	Swiss Party of Labour	3,730	0
Basel-Stadt	8	62,657	41,761	Social Democratic Party	96,217	2
Basel-Stadt	8	62,657	41,761	Free Democratic Party	63,473	2
Basel-Stadt	8	62,657	41,761	Liberal Party	42,806	1
Basel-Stadt	8	62,657	41,761	Conservative People's Party	40,908	1
Basel-Stadt	8	62,657	41,761	Swiss Party of Labour	39,558	1
Basel-Stadt	8	62,657	41,761	Ring of Independents	35,804	1
Basel-Stadt	8	62,657	41,761	Party of Farmers, Traders and Independents	12,458	0
Bern	33	248,241	177,779	Social Democratic Party	2,086,933	12
Bern	33	248,241	177,779	Party of Farmers, Traders and Independents	1,978,637	11
Bern	33	248,241	177,779	Free Democratic Party	992,985	6
Bern	33	248,241	177,779	Conservative People's Party	344,568	2
Bern	33	248,241	177,779	Ring of Independents	234,662	2
Bern	33	248,241	177,779	Liberal Socialist Party	96,638	0
Fribourg	7	45,959	33,379	Conservative People's Party	123,845	4
Fribourg	7	45,959	33,379	Free Democratic Party	50,804	1
Fribourg	7	45,959	33,379	Social Democratic Party	25,834	1
Fribourg	7	45,959	33,379	Party of Farmers, Traders and Independents	29,717	1
Geneva	8	59,936	30,902	Free Democratic Party	76,509	3
Geneva	8	59,936	30,902	Swiss Party of Labour	56,864	2
Geneva	8	59,936	30,902	Liberal Party	44,238	1
Geneva	8	59,936	30,902	Conservative People's Party	37,503	1
Geneva	8	59,936	30,902	Social Democratic Party	29,914	1
Glarus	2	Elected unopposed		Social Democratic Party		1
Glarus	2	Elected unopposed		Free Democratic Party		1
Grisons	6	37,371	27,381	Conservative People's Party	66,320	3
Grisons	6	37,371	27,381	Social-Political Group	45,949	2
Grisons	6	37,371	27,381	Free Democratic Party	26,600	1
Grisons	6	37,371	27,381	Social Democratic Party	21,020	0
Lucerne	9	66,383	56,703	Conservative People's Party	251,728	5
Lucerne	9	66,383	56,703	Free Democratic Party	197,601	3
Lucerne	9	66,383	56,703	Social Democratic Party	54,744	1
Neuchâtel	5	40,626	21,290	Social Democratic Party	42,460	2
Neuchâtel	5	40,626	21,290	Free Democratic Party	29,831	2
Neuchâtel	5	40,626	21,290	Liberal Party	24,577	1
Neuchâtel	5	40,626	21,290	Swiss Party of Labour	7,700	0
Nidwalden	1	5,629	2,774	Conservative People's Party	2,443	1
Obwalden	1	6,209	3,837	Conservative People's Party	2,267	1
Obwalden	1	6,209	3,837	Others	1,450	0
Schaffhausen	2	Elected unopposed		Free Democratic Party		1
Schaffhausen	2	Elected unopposed		Social Democratic Party		1
Schwyz	3	20,727	14,974	Conservative People's Party	21,761	2
Schwyz	3	20,727	14,974	Social Democratic Party	11,840	1
Schwyz	3	20,727	14,974	Free Democratic Party	10,325	0
Solothurn	7	51,886	44,176	Free Democratic Party	129,255	3
Solothurn	7	51,886	44,176	Social Democratic Party	94,128	2
Solothurn	7	51,886	44,176	Conservative People's Party	78,558	2
St. Gallen	13	85,709	67,673	Conservative People's Party	373,128	6
St. Gallen	13	85,709	67,673	Free Democratic Party	251,809	4
St. Gallen	13	85,709	67,673	Social Democratic Party	151,500	2
St. Gallen	13	85,709	67,673	Ring of Independents	62,810	1
Ticino	7	48,860	32,959	Free Democratic Party	94,012	3
Ticino	7	48,860	32,959	Conservative People's Party	93,872	3
Ticino	7	48,860	32,959	Social Democratic Party	39,234	1
Thurgau	6	43,397	33,618	Social Democratic Party	56,574	2
Thurgau	6	43,397	33,618	Party of Farmers, Traders and Independents	52,195	2
Thurgau	6	43,397	33,618	Conservative People's Party	47,643	1
Thurgau	6	43,397	33,618	Free Democratic Party	38,552	1
Uri	1	8,244	5,358	Free Democratic Party	4,528	1
Vaud	16	113,520	57,940	Free Democratic Party	342,180	7
Vaud	16	113,520	57,940	Social Democratic Party	194,887	4
Vaud	16	113,520	57,940	Liberal Party	144,537	2
Vaud	16	113,520	57,940	Swiss Party of Labour	94,717	1
Vaud	16	113,520	57,940	Party of Farmers, Traders and Independents	85,583	1
Vaud	16	113,520	57,940	Conservative People's Party	44,102	1
Valais	7	46,424	34,464	Conservative People's Party	147,944	5
Valais	7	46,424	34,464	Free Democratic Party	48,671	1
Valais	7	46,424	34,464	Social Democratic Party	36,017	1
Valais	7	46,424	34,464	Union of Peasants and Workers	4,941	0
Zug	2	12,019	8,630	Conservative People's Party	7,319	1
Zug	2	12,019	8,630	Free Democratic Party	5,009	1
Zug	2	12,019	8,630	Social Democratic Party	4,322	0
Zürich	32	241,946	181,174	Social Democratic Party	1,664,685	9
Zürich	32	241,946	181,174	Ring of Independents	932,376	6
Zürich	32	241,946	181,174	Party of Farmers, Traders and Independents	840,325	5
Zürich	32	241,946	181,174	Free Democratic Party	763,778	5
Zürich	32	241,946	181,174	Conservative People's Party	585,249	3
Zürich	32	241,946	181,174	Social-Political Group	370,488	2
Zürich	32	241,946	181,174	Swiss Party of Labour	166,957	1
Zürich	32	241,946	181,174	Evangelical People's Party	222,328	1
Zürich	32	241,946	181,174	Liberal Socialist Party	136,151	0
Source: Bundesblatt, 29 November 1951

=== Council of the States ===
In several cantons the members of the Council of the States were chosen by the cantonal parliaments.

Party	Seats	+/–
Swiss Conservative People's Party	18	0
Free Democratic Party	12	+1
Social Democratic Party	4	–1
Party of Farmers, Traders and Independents	3	–1
Liberal Democratic Party	3	+1
Social-Political Group	2	0
Other parties	2	0
Total	44	0
Source: Nohlen & Stöver
