= Communist Party of Switzerland =

Communist Party of Switzerland Kommunistische Partei der Schweiz Parti communiste suisse Partito Comunista Svizzero
- Abbreviation: KPS/PCS
- President: Franz Welti (first)
- General Secretary: Marino Bodenmann (first)
- Founded: 6 March 1921
- Banned: 26 November 1940
- Split from: PS/SP
- Succeeded by: Swiss Party of Labour
- Newspaper: Kämpfer
- Membership (c. 1921): 6,000
- Ideology: Communism
- Political position: Far-left
- International affiliation: Comintern

The Communist Party of Switzerland (German: Kommunistische Partei der Schweiz; KPS) or Swiss Communist Party (French: Parti communiste suisse; Italian: Partito Comunista Svizzero; PCS) was a communist party in Switzerland between 1921 and 1944. It was the Swiss section of the Communist International (Comintern).

== History ==
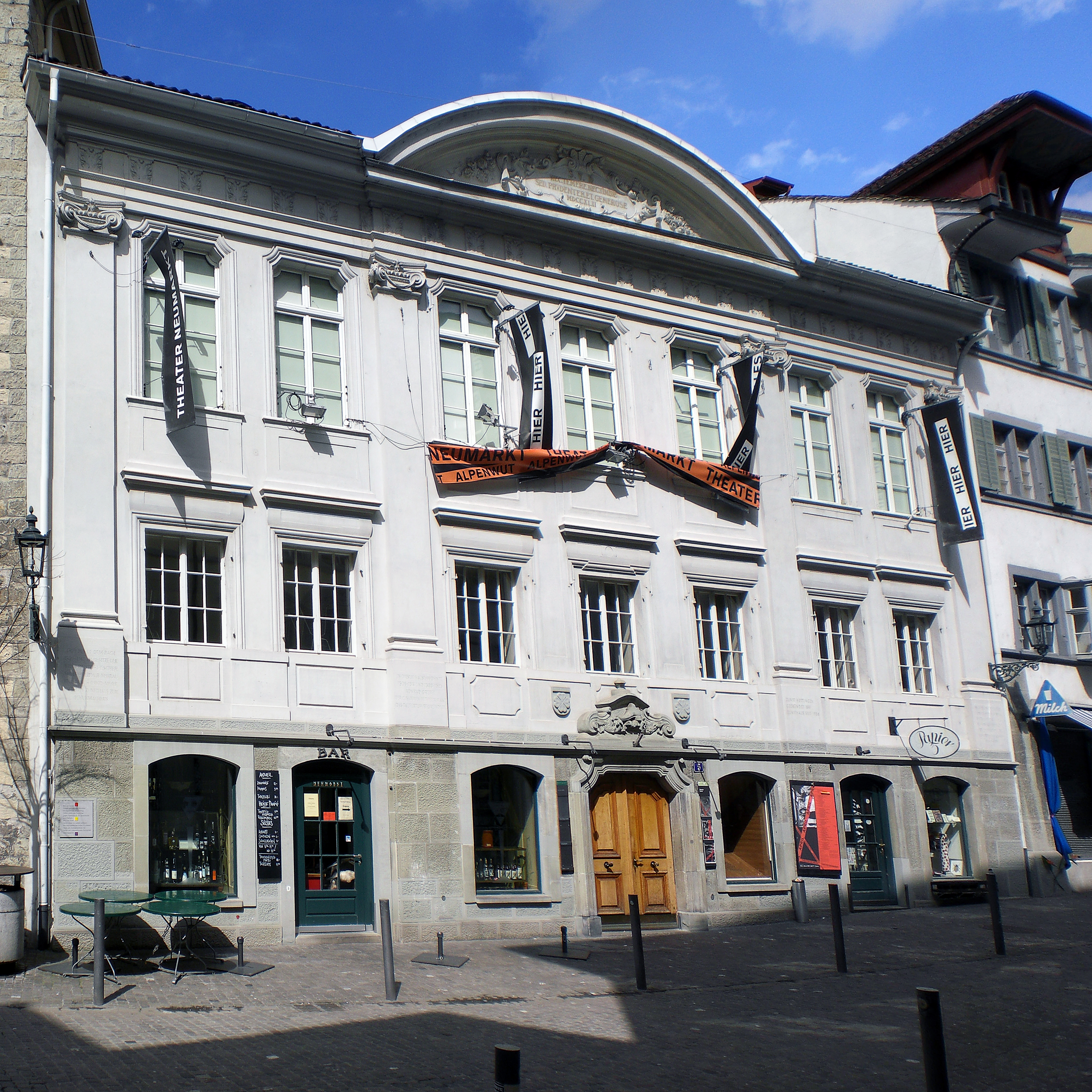
The Theater Neumarkt in Zürich, where the party was founded in 1921

The Communist Party of Switzerland was founded in March 1921, in Zürich, by dissidents from the left wing of the Social Democratic Party of Switzerland and a communist group formed in the aftermath of World War I. Fritz Platten was a central leader in the new party.

The party drew most of its support from urban areas in German-speaking Switzerland, most notably the cities of Basel, Schaffhausen and Zürich. It counted six thousand members upon its foundation, of which 15% were women. Through subsidiary organizations, the party gathered support from various groups, such as the unemployed, women and intellectuals.

From the late 1920s to early 1930s, the Communist Party's political program underwent Stalinization. A major turning point occurred in 1930, when the expulsion of Walther Bringolf led to the split of nearly the entire Schaffhausen section into the Communist Party Opposition, which merged into the Social Democrats five years later. The number of party members and voters decreased progressively, though the adoption of popular front tactics in 1935 led to a slight increase in membership. Nevertheless, anti-communist laws adopted by a number of cantons, as well as party policies such as abandoning anti-fascism (following the Molotov–Ribbentrop Pact) and supporting the Soviet invasion of Finland led to a decline in popularity.

In November 1940, the Communist Party was banned by the Swiss government for its support of the Molotov–Ribbentrop Pact, the non-aggression pact between the Soviet Union and Nazi Germany. The ban had been preceded by the outlawing of communist propaganda and activities in Switzerland in August. On 12 June 1941, all four communist members of the National Council were removed from office. The party continued to operate illegally with about 350 members until 1944, when it merged with the Swiss Socialist Federation to form the Swiss Party of Labour.

=== Role in the Comintern ===
Despite its small size, the Swiss Communist Party played an important role within the Comintern. After the Communist Party of Germany (KPD) was banned by the Nazi government, in 1933, its leadership in Southern Germany went into exile in Switzerland and was sheltered by the Swiss communists. The party also gave financial aid to some KPD officials and shelter to some of the German-based Comintern press agencies.

During the Spanish Civil War, the party contributed to the International Brigades by assisting the mobilization of volunteers from Austria and other countries.

== Election results ==
At the national level, the Swiss Communist Party had its best electoral performances in the 1920s. In 1928, with 19.7% of the popular vote, it won 25 seats in the Grand Council of Basel-Stadt, the cantonal legislature of Basel-Stadt. At the federal level, the party received its highest vote share in the 1939 election, the last it contested, winning four seats in the National Council, the lower chamber of the Federal Assembly; it was never elected into the Council States (upper chamber).

=== National Council ===
Election year	% of overall vote	# of seats won	+/-
1922	1.8	2 / 198	new
1925	2.0	3 / 198	▲1
1928	1.8	2 / 198	▼1
1931	1.5	2 / 187	Steady
1935	1.4	2 / 187	Steady
1939	2.6	4 / 187	▲2
Source: Federal Statistical Office
