= 1943 Swiss federal election =

Federal elections were held in Switzerland on 31 October 1943. The Social Democratic Party emerged as the largest party in the National Council, winning 56 of the 194 seats.

== Results ==
=== National Council ===
Party	Votes	%	Seats	+/–
Social Democratic Party	251,576	28.60	56	+11
Free Democratic Party	197,746	22.48	47	–2
Conservative People's Party	182,916	20.79	43	0
Party of Farmers, Traders and Independents	101,998	11.59	22	0
Alliance of Independents	48,557	5.52	7	–2
Social-Political Group	29,627	3.37	5	0
Liberal Democratic Party	28,434	3.23	8	+2
Young Farmers	18,310	2.08	3	0
Liberal Socialist Party	9,031	1.03	0	–1
Evangelical People's Party	3,627	0.41	1	+1
Other parties	7,918	0.90	2	+2
Total	879,740	100.00	194	+7
Valid votes	879,740	96.86		
Invalid/blank votes	28,506	3.14		
Total votes	908,246	100.00		
Registered voters/turnout	1,296,706	70.04		
Source: Mackie & Rose, Nohlen & Stöver

==== By constituency ====
Constituency	Seats	Electorate	Turnout	Party	Votes	Seats won
Aargau	12	81,680	70,634	Social Democratic Party	292,459	5
Aargau	12	81,680	70,634	Conservative People's Party	165,210	3
Aargau	12	81,680	70,634	Free Democratic Party	148,715	2
Aargau	12	81,680	70,634	Party of Farmers, Traders and Independents	137,535	2
Aargau	12	81,680	70,634	Ring of Independents	35,693	0
Aargau	12	81,680	70,634	Young Farmers	25,795	0
Appenzell Ausserrhoden	2	Elected unopposed		Free Democratic Party		1
Appenzell Ausserrhoden	2	Elected unopposed		Social Democratic Party		1
Appenzell Innerrhoden	1	3,488	1,755	Conservative People's Party	1,520	1
Basel-Landschaft	4	29,333	18,447	Social Democratic Party	25,370	2
Basel-Landschaft	4	29,333	18,447	Free Democratic Party	12,260	1
Basel-Landschaft	4	29,333	18,447	Social-Political Group	12,829	1
Basel-Landschaft	4	29,333	18,447	Ring of Independents	12,302	0
Basel-Landschaft	4	29,333	18,447	Conservative People's Party	9,476	0
Basel-Stadt	8	53,333	35,358	Social Democratic Party	97,050	3
Basel-Stadt	8	53,333	35,358	Liberal Democratic Party	58,980	2
Basel-Stadt	8	53,333	35,358	Free Democratic Party	44,932	1
Basel-Stadt	8	53,333	35,358	Ring of Independents	33,100	1
Basel-Stadt	8	53,333	35,358	Conservative People's Party	29,926	1
Basel-Stadt	8	53,333	35,358	Liberal Socialist Party	7,216	0
Bern	33	233,129	160,259	Social Democratic Party	1,890,855	13
Bern	33	233,129	160,259	Party of Farmers, Traders and Independents	1,615,361	11
Bern	33	233,129	160,259	Free Democratic Party	784,181	5
Bern	33	233,129	160,259	Young Farmers	333,117	2
Bern	33	233,129	160,259	Conservative People's Party	306,410	2
Bern	33	233,129	160,259	Liberal Socialist Party	113,922	0
Bern	33	233,129	160,259	Ring of Independents	113,698	0
Fribourg	7	45,000	31,013	Conservative People's Party	134,184	5
Fribourg	7	45,000	31,013	Free Democratic Party	46,730	1
Fribourg	7	45,000	31,013	Social Democratic Party	24,983	1
Fribourg	7	45,000	31,013	Party of Farmers, Traders and Independents	8,211	0
Geneva	8	53,303	19,168	Free Democratic Party	54,550	3
Geneva	8	53,303	19,168	Liberal Democratic Party	36,466	2
Geneva	8	53,303	19,168	Conservative People's Party	30,955	2
Geneva	8	53,303	19,168	Social Democratic Party	22,462	1
Glarus	2	10,693	8,176	Social Democratic Party	6,093	1
Glarus	2	10,693	8,176	Free Democratic Party	3,957	1
Glarus	2	10,693	8,176	Social-Political Group	3,630	0
Glarus	2	10,693	8,176	Conservative People's Party	2,172	0
Grisons	6	37,111	27,396	Social-Political Group	63,109	3
Grisons	6	37,111	27,396	Conservative People's Party	55,543	2
Grisons	6	37,111	27,396	Free Democratic Party	22,623	1
Grisons	6	37,111	27,396	Social Democratic Party	17,075	0
Lucerne	9	63,050	51,067	Conservative People's Party	218,276	5
Lucerne	9	63,050	51,067	Free Democratic Party	159,315	3
Lucerne	9	63,050	51,067	Social Democratic Party	46,706	1
Lucerne	9	63,050	51,067	Ring of Independents	17,338	0
Lucerne	9	63,050	51,067	Party of Farmers, Traders and Independents	11,702	0
Neuchâtel	5	38,868	22,170	Social Democratic Party	49,905	2
Neuchâtel	5	38,868	22,170	Free Democratic Party	32,102	2
Neuchâtel	5	38,868	22,170	Liberal Democratic Party	25,753	1
Nidwalden	1	5,446	3,823	Conservative People's Party	2,256	1
Nidwalden	1	5,446	3,823	Others	1,506	0
Obwalden	1	6,129	4,202	Conservative People's Party	2,421	1
Obwalden	1	6,129	4,202	Others	1,642	0
Schaffhausen	2	16,526	14,881	Social Democratic Party	14,254	1
Schaffhausen	2	16,526	14,881	Free Democratic Party	9,071	1
Schaffhausen	2	16,526	14,881	Party of Farmers, Traders and Independents	4,939	0
Schwyz	3	19,444	13,688	Farmers Association	12,247	1
Schwyz	3	19,444	13,688	Conservative People's Party	10,671	1
Schwyz	3	19,444	13,688	Free Democratic Party	9,542	1
Schwyz	3	19,444	13,688	Social Democratic Party	7,582	0
Solothurn	7	48,418	39,704	Free Democratic Party	99,559	3
Solothurn	7	48,418	39,704	Social Democratic Party	85,348	2
Solothurn	7	48,418	39,704	Conservative People's Party	66,977	2
Solothurn	7	48,418	39,704	Ring of Independents	10,248	0
Solothurn	7	48,418	39,704	Party of Farmers, Traders and Independents	8,188	0
St. Gallen	13	79,723	63,865	Conservative People's Party	307,482	5
St. Gallen	13	79,723	63,865	Free Democratic Party	213,315	4
St. Gallen	13	79,723	63,865	Social Democratic Party	149,969	2
St. Gallen	13	79,723	63,865	Ring of Independents	57,139	1
St. Gallen	13	79,723	63,865	Young Farmers	30,378	1
St. Gallen	13	79,723	63,865	Association of Free Democrats	29,465	0
Ticino	7	45,624	33,592	Conservative People's Party	81,410	3
Ticino	7	45,624	33,592	Free Democratic Party	70,725	2
Ticino	7	45,624	33,592	Social Democratic Party	51,703	2
Ticino	7	45,624	33,592	Social-Political Group	23,117	0
Thurgau	6	41,470	31,581	Social Democratic Party	58,652	2
Thurgau	6	41,470	31,581	Party of Farmers, Traders and Independents	46,166	2
Thurgau	6	41,470	31,581	Conservative People's Party	38,010	1
Thurgau	6	41,470	31,581	Free Democratic Party	34,479	1
Thurgau	6	41,470	31,581	Young Farmers	6,879	0
Uri	1	8,144	3,686	Free Democratic Party	2,924	1
Vaud	16	106,274	57,927	Free Democratic Party	371,719	8
Vaud	16	106,274	57,927	Social Democratic Party	198,282	3
Vaud	16	106,274	57,927	Liberal Democratic Party	181,686	3
Vaud	16	106,274	57,927	Party of Farmers, Traders and Independents	100,593	2
Vaud	16	106,274	57,927	Ring of Independents	39,170	0
Vaud	16	106,274	57,927	Labor List	6,198	0
Valais	7	43,094	32,872	Conservative People's Party	131,385	5
Valais	7	43,094	32,872	Free Democratic Party	47,942	1
Valais	7	43,094	32,872	Social Democratic Party	37,366	1
Valais	7	43,094	32,872	Valais People's List	9,146	0
Zug	2	10,926	7,278	Conservative People's Party	5,975	1
Zug	2	10,926	7,278	Social Democratic Party	4,541	1
Zug	2	10,926	7,278	Free Democratic Party	3,274	0
Zürich	31	216,549	155,565	Social Democratic Party	1,655,010	12
Zürich	31	216,549	155,565	Party of Farmers, Traders and Independents	665,668	5
Zürich	31	216,549	155,565	Ring of Independents	550,575	4
Zürich	31	216,549	155,565	Free Democratic Party	542,072	4
Zürich	31	216,549	155,565	Conservative People's Party	366,942	2
Zürich	31	216,549	155,565	Social-Political Group	363,548	2
Zürich	31	216,549	155,565	Independent-Free List	214,569	1
Zürich	31	216,549	155,565	Liberal Socialist Party	113,547	0
Zürich	31	216,549	155,565	Evangelical People's Party	112,441	1
Zürich	31	216,549	155,565	List of Free Economic Action	31,488	0
Zürich	31	216,549	155,565	Young Farmers	80,263	0
Source: Bundesblatt, 23 November 1943

=== Council of the States ===
In several cantons the members of the Council of the States were chosen by the cantonal parliaments.

Party	Seats	+/–
Swiss Conservative People's Party	19	+1
Free Democratic Party	12	–2
Social Democratic Party	5	+2
Party of Farmers, Traders and Independents	4	0
Liberal Democratic Party	2	0
Social-Political Group	2	+2
Other parties	0	–3
Total	44	0
Source: Nohlen & Stöver
