= 1925 Swiss federal election =

Federal elections were held in Switzerland on 25 October 1925. The Free Democratic Party remained the largest party in the National Council, winning 60 of the 198 seats.

== Results ==
=== National Council ===
Party	Votes	%	Seats	+/–
Free Democratic Party	206,485	27.77	60	0
Social Democratic Party	192,208	25.85	49	+6
Conservative People's Party	155,467	20.91	42	–2
Party of Farmers, Traders and Independents	113,512	15.26	30	–4
Liberal Democratic Party	22,217	2.99	7	–3
Democratic Group	16,362	2.20	5	+2
Communist Party	14,837	2.00	3	+1
Evangelical People's Party	6,888	0.93	1	0
Liberal Socialist Party	1,602	0.22	0	0
Grütli Union	427	0.06	0	0
Union for Economic Defence	13,674	1.84	1	New
Other parties	13,674	1.84	0	–
Total	743,679	100.00	198	0
Valid votes	743,679	97.26		
Invalid/blank votes	20,915	2.74		
Total votes	764,594	100.00		
Registered voters/turnout	995,551	76.80		
Source: Nohlen & Stöver

==== By constituencies ====
Constituency	Seats	Party	Seats won
Aargau	12	Social Democratic Party	4
Aargau	12	Party of Farmers, Traders and Independents	3
Aargau	12	Conservative People's Party	3
Aargau	12	Free Democratic Party	2
Appenzell Ausserrhoden	3	Free Democratic Party	2
Appenzell Ausserrhoden	3	Social Democratic Party	1
Appenzell Innerrhoden	1	Conservative People's Party	1
Basel-Landschaft	4	Free Democratic Party	2
Basel-Landschaft	4	Party of Farmers, Traders and Independents	1
Basel-Landschaft	4	Social Democratic Party	1
Basel-Stadt	7	Social Democratic Party	2
Basel-Stadt	7	Communist Party	1
Basel-Stadt	7	Conservative People's Party	1
Basel-Stadt	7	Free Democratic Party	1
Basel-Stadt	7	Liberal Democratic Party	1
Basel-Stadt	7	Party of Farmers, Traders and Independents	1
Bern	34	Party of Farmers, Traders and Independents	14
Bern	34	Social Democratic Party	12
Bern	34	Free Democratic Party	6
Bern	34	Conservative People's Party	2
Fribourg	7	Conservative People's Party	5
Fribourg	7	Free Democratic Party	2
Geneva	8	Social Democratic Party	3
Geneva	8	Liberal Democratic Party	2
Geneva	8	Free Democratic Party	2
Geneva	8	Conservative People's Party	1
Geneva	8	Union for Economic Defence	1
Glarus	2	Democratic Group	1
Glarus	2	Free Democratic Party	1
Grisons	6	Conservative People's Party	3
Grisons	6	Free Democratic Party	2
Grisons	6	Democratic Group	1
Lucerne	9	Conservative People's Party	5
Lucerne	9	Free Democratic Party	3
Lucerne	9	Social Democratic Party	1
Neuchâtel	7	Social Democratic Party	3
Neuchâtel	7	Free Democratic Party	2
Neuchâtel	7	Liberal Democratic Party	1
Neuchâtel	7	National Progressive Party	1
Nidwalden	1	Conservative People's Party	1
Obwalden	1	Conservative People's Party	1
Schaffhausen	3	Communist Party	1
Schaffhausen	3	Free Democratic Party	1
Schaffhausen	3	Party of Farmers, Traders and Independents	1
Schwyz	3	Conservative People's Party	1
Schwyz	3	Free Democratic Party	1
Schwyz	3	Social Democratic Party	1
Solothurn	7	Free Democratic Party	3
Solothurn	7	Conservative People's Party	2
Solothurn	7	Social Democratic Party	2
St. Gallen	15	Conservative People's Party	6
St. Gallen	15	Free Democratic Party	5
St. Gallen	15	Social Democratic Party	3
St. Gallen	15	Democratic Group	1
Ticino	8	Free Democratic Party	4
Ticino	8	Conservative People's Party	3
Ticino	8	Social Democratic Party	1
Thurgau	7	Party of Farmers, Traders and Independents	3
Thurgau	7	Conservative People's Party	1
Thurgau	7	Democratic Group	1
Thurgau	7	Free Democratic Party	1
Thurgau	7	Social Democratic Party	1
Uri	1	Free Democratic Party	1
Vaud	16	Free Democratic Party	8
Vaud	16	Liberal Democratic Party	3
Vaud	16	Social Democratic Party	4
Vaud	16	Party of Farmers, Traders and Independents	1
Valais	6	Conservative People's Party	4
Valais	6	Free Democratic Party	2
Zug	2	Conservative People's Party	1
Zug	2	Free Democratic Party	1
Zürich	27	Social Democratic Party	10
Zürich	27	Free Democratic Party	8
Zürich	27	Party of Farmers, Traders and Independents	6
Zürich	27	Communist Party	1
Zürich	27	Conservative People's Party	1
Zürich	27	Evangelical People's Party	1
Source: Bundesamt für Statistik

=== Council of States ===
In several cantons the members of the Council of States were chosen by the cantonal parliaments.

Party	Seats	+/–
Free Democratic Party	21	–2
Swiss Conservative People's Party	18	+1
Social Democratic Party	2	+1
Democratic Group	1	0
Liberal Democratic Party	1	0
Party of Farmers, Traders and Independents	1	0
Other parties	0	0
Total	44	0
Source: Nohlen & Stöver

==== By canton ====
Constituency	Seats	Party	Elected members
Aargau	2	Free Democratic Party	Gottfried Keller
Aargau	2	Free Democratic Party	Peter Emil Isler
Appenzell Ausserrhoden	1	Free Democratic Party	Johannes Baumann
Appenzell Innerrhoden	1	Conservative People's Party	Carl Rusch
Basel-Landschaft	1	Free Democratic Party	Gustav Johann Schneider
Basel-Stadt	1	Social Democratic Party	Eugen Wullschleger
Bern	2	Free Democratic Party	Paul Charmillot
Bern	2	Party of Farmers, Traders and Independents	Carl Moser
Fribourg	2	Conservative People's Party	Emile Savoy
Fribourg	2	Conservative People's Party	Bernard Weck
Geneva	2	Social Democratic Party	Charles Burklin
Geneva	2	Free Democratic Party	Alexandre Moriaud
Glarus	2	Democratic Group	Edwin Hauser
Glarus	2	Free Democratic Party	Philippe Mercier
Grisons	2	Conservative People's Party	Friedrich Brügger
Grisons	2	Free Democratic Party	Andreas Laely
Lucerne	2	Conservative People's Party	Jakob Sigrist
Lucerne	2	Conservative People's Party	Josef Winiger
Neuchâtel	2	Free Democratic Party	Ernest Béguin
Neuchâtel	2	Liberal Party	Pierre de Meuron
Nidwalden	1	Conservative People's Party	Anton Zumbühl
Obwalden	1	Conservative People's Party	Adalbert Wirz
Schaffhausen	2	Free Democratic Party	Albert Ammann
Schaffhausen	2	Free Democratic Party	Heinrich Bolli
Schwyz	2	Conservative People's Party	Martin Ochsner
Schwyz	2	Conservative People's Party	Josef Räber
Solothurn	2	Free Democratic Party	Hugo Dietschi
Solothurn	2	Free Democratic Party	Robert Schöpfer
St. Gallen	2	Free Democratic Party	Johannes Geel
St. Gallen	2	Conservative People's Party	Anton August Messmer
Ticino	2	Free Democratic Party	Brenno Bertoni
Ticino	2	Conservative People's Party	Antonio Luigi Riva
Thurgau	2	Free Democratic Party	Albert Böhi
Thurgau	2	Free Democratic Party	Rudolf Huber
Uri	2	Conservative People's Party	Franz Muheim
Uri	2	Conservative People's Party	Josef Wipfli
Vaud	2	Free Democratic Party	Émile Dind
Vaud	2	Free Democratic Party	Henri Simon
Valais	2	Conservative People's Party	Joseph Ribordy
Valais	2	Conservative People's Party	Raymund Loretan
Zug	2	Conservative People's Party	Josef Andermatt
Zug	2	Conservative People's Party	Josef Hildebrand
Zürich	2	Free Democratic Party	Gustav Keller
Zürich	2	Free Democratic Party	Oskar Wettstein
