= 1939 Swiss federal election =

Federal elections were held in Switzerland on 29 October 1939. The Free Democratic Party emerged as the largest party in the National Council, winning 49 of the 187 seats. Due to the outbreak of World War II, there were no elections in nine of the 25 cantons; Appenzell Ausserrhoden, Lucerne, Neuchâtel, Schwyz, Solothurn, Ticino, Valais, Vaud and Zug. In what became known as "silent elections", a total of 55 candidates were elected unopposed.

== Results ==
=== National Council ===
Party	Votes	%	Seats	+/–
Social Democratic Party	160,377	25.93	45	–5
Free Democratic Party	128,163	20.72	49	+1
Conservative People's Party	105,018	16.98	43	+1
Party of Farmers, Traders and Independents	91,182	14.74	22	+1
Alliance of Independents	43,735	7.07	9	+2
Young Farmers	27,708	4.48	3	–1
Social-Political Group	16,891	2.73	5	+2
Communist Party	15,962	2.58	4	+2
Liberal Socialist Party	10,865	1.76	1	+1
Liberal Democratic Party	10,241	1.66	6	0
Evangelical People's Party	5,726	0.93	0	–1
Other parties	2,665	0.43	0	0
Total	618,533	100.00	187	0
Valid votes	618,533	96.67		
Invalid/blank votes	21,332	3.33		
Total votes	639,865	100.00		
Registered voters/turnout	861,266	74.29		
Source: Mackie & Rose, Nohlen & Stöver

==== By constituency ====
Constituency	Seats	Electorate	Turnout	Party	Votes	Seats won
Aargau	12	75,509	67,271	Social Democratic Party	258,919	5
Aargau	12	75,509	67,271	Conservative People's Party	168,606	3
Aargau	12	75,509	67,271	Party of Farmers, Traders and Independents	113,270	2
Aargau	12	75,509	67,271	Free Democratic Party	125,232	2
Aargau	12	75,509	67,271	Young Farmers	41,663	0
Aargau	12	75,509	67,271	Ring of Independents	34,097	0
Aargau	12	75,509	67,271	Evangelical People's Party	27,075	0
Appenzell Ausserrhoden	2	Elected unopposed		Social Democratic Party		1
Appenzell Ausserrhoden	2	Elected unopposed		Free Democratic Party		1
Appenzell Innerrhoden	1	3,501	2,153	Conservative People's Party	1,640	1
Basel-Landschaft	4	28,207	17,788	Social Democratic Party	18,841	1
Basel-Landschaft	4	28,207	17,788	Free Democratic Party	16,448	1
Basel-Landschaft	4	28,207	17,788	Liberal Socialist Party	11,522	1
Basel-Landschaft	4	28,207	17,788	Basel Farmers' Party, Free Democrats and Independents	8,864	1
Basel-Landschaft	4	28,207	17,788	Conservative People's Party	8,767	1
Basel-Landschaft	4	28,207	17,788	Young Farmers	2,788	0
Basel-Landschaft	4	28,207	17,788	Communist Party	1,617	0
Basel-Landschaft	4	28,207	17,788	Action Committee for Breaking the Interest Bondage	259	0
Basel-Stadt	7	51,833	35,833	Social Democratic Party	81,452	2
Basel-Stadt	7	51,833	35,833	Ring of Independents	34,711	2
Basel-Stadt	7	51,833	35,833	Liberal Democratic Party	34,202	1
Basel-Stadt	7	51,833	35,833	Free Democratic Party	32,087	1
Basel-Stadt	7	51,833	35,833	Conservative People's Party	25,373	1
Basel-Stadt	7	51,833	35,833	Communist Party	22,784	0
Basel-Stadt	7	51,833	35,833	Party of Farmers, Traders and Independents	14,869	0
Bern	31	209,052	148,467	Party of Farmers, Traders and Independents	1,421,518	10
Bern	31	209,052	148,467	Social Democratic Party	1,351,567	10
Bern	31	209,052	148,467	Free Democratic Party	674,258	5
Bern	31	209,052	148,467	Young Farmers	458,062	3
Bern	31	209,052	148,467	Conservative People's Party	267,642	2
Bern	31	209,052	148,467	Ring of Independents	169,046	1
Bern	31	209,052	148,467	Liberal Socialist Party	123,477	0
Bern	31	209,052	148,467	Communist Party	24,891	0
Fribourg	7	40,945	28,485	Conservative People's Party	118,997	5
Fribourg	7	40,945	28,485	Free Democratic Party	51,815	2
Fribourg	7	40,945	28,485	Party of Farmers, Traders and Independents	24,003	0
Geneva	8	50,172	31,849	Social Democratic Party	90,591	3
Geneva	8	50,172	31,849	Free Democratic Party	81,438	3
Geneva	8	50,172	31,849	Liberal Democratic Party	42,836	1
Geneva	8	50,172	31,849	Conservative People's Party	34,276	1
Glarus	2	10,148	7,828	Social-Political Group	6,495	1
Glarus	2	10,148	7,828	Social Democratic Party	4,496	1
Glarus	2	10,148	7,828	Free Democratic Party	4,242	0
Grisons	6	37,409	28,325	Social-Political Group	64,095	3
Grisons	6	37,409	28,325	Conservative People's Party	56,059	2
Grisons	6	37,409	28,325	Free Democratic Party	28,669	1
Grisons	6	37,409	28,325	Social Democratic Party	15,939	0
Lucerne	9	Elected unopposed		Conservative People's Party		5
Lucerne	9	Elected unopposed		Free Democratic Party		3
Lucerne	9	Elected unopposed		Social Democratic Party		1
Neuchâtel	6	Elected unopposed		Social Democratic Party		3
Neuchâtel	6	Elected unopposed		Free Democratic Party		2
Neuchâtel	6	Elected unopposed		Liberal Democratic Party		1
Nidwalden	1	4,463	3,180	Conservative People's Party	1,430	1
Obwalden	1	5,461	2,275	Conservative People's Party	1,535	1
Schaffhausen	2	15,692	13,896	Social Democratic Party	11,620	1
Schaffhausen	2	15,692	13,896	Free Democratic Party	9,271	1
Schaffhausen	2	15,692	13,896	Party of Farmers, Traders and Independents	5,502	0
Schwyz	3	Elected unopposed		Conservative People's Party		2
Schwyz	3	Elected unopposed		Free Democratic Party		1
Solothurn	7	Elected unopposed		Free Democratic Party		3
Solothurn	7	Elected unopposed		Social Democratic Party		2
Solothurn	7	Elected unopposed		Conservative People's Party		2
St. Gallen	13	77,171	64,614	Conservative People's Party	317,244	6
St. Gallen	13	77,171	64,614	Free Democratic Party	213,143	4
St. Gallen	13	77,171	64,614	Social Democratic Party	128,964	2
St. Gallen	13	77,171	64,614	Ring of Independents	59,579	1
St. Gallen	13	77,171	64,614	Association of Free Democrats	38,509	0
St. Gallen	13	77,171	64,614	Young Farmers	35,309	0
Ticino	7	Elected unopposed		Conservative People's Party		3
Ticino	7	Elected unopposed		Free Democratic Party		2
Ticino	7	Elected unopposed		Social-Political Group		1
Ticino	7	Elected unopposed		Social Democratic Party		1
Thurgau	6	39,298	31,485	Social Democratic Party	49,323	2
Thurgau	6	39,298	31,485	Party of Farmers, Traders and Independents	42,542	2
Thurgau	6	39,298	31,485	Conservative People's Party	36,987	1
Thurgau	6	39,298	31,485	Free Democratic Party	36,796	1
Thurgau	6	39,298	31,485	Young Farmers	13,991	0
Uri	1	6,979	4,091	Free Democratic Party	3,448	1
Vaud	15	Elected unopposed		Free Democratic Party		6
Vaud	15	Elected unopposed		Social Democratic Party		4
Vaud	15	Elected unopposed		Liberal Democratic Party		3
Vaud	15	Elected unopposed		Party of Farmers, Traders and Independents		2
Valais	6	Elected unopposed		Conservative People's Party		4
Valais	6	Elected unopposed		Free Democratic Party		1
Valais	6	Elected unopposed		Social Democratic Party		1
Zug	2	Elected unopposed		Conservative People's Party		1
Zug	2	Elected unopposed		Free Democratic Party		1
Zürich	28	205,426	152,325	Social Democratic Party	1,306,638	10
Zürich	28	205,426	152,325	Ring of Independents	724,715	5
Zürich	28	205,426	152,325	Party of Farmers, Traders and Independents	574,284	5
Zürich	28	205,426	152,325	Free Democratic Party	517,470	4
Zürich	28	205,426	152,325	Social-Political Group	338,508	2
Zürich	28	205,426	152,325	Conservative People's Party	287,214	2
Zürich	28	205,426	152,325	Liberal Socialist Party	111,943	0
Zürich	28	205,426	152,325	Young Farmers	104,068	0
Zürich	28	205,426	152,325	Communist Party	98,114	0
Zürich	28	205,426	152,325	Evangelical People's Party	97,178	0
Source: Bundesblatt, 29 November 1939

=== Council of the States ===
In several cantons the members of the Council of the States were chosen by the cantonal parliaments.

Party	Seats	+/–
Swiss Conservative People's Party	18	–1
Free Democratic Party	14	–1
Party of Farmers, Traders and Independents	4	+1
Social Democratic Party	3	0
Liberal Democratic Party	2	0
Social-Political Group	0	0
Other parties	3	+1
Total	44	0
Source: Nohlen & Stöver
