= 1935 Swiss federal election =

Federal elections were held in Switzerland on 27 October 1935. The Social Democratic Party emerged as the largest party in the National Council, winning 50 of the 187 seats.

== Results ==
=== National Council ===
Party	Votes	%	Seats	+/–
Social Democratic Party	255,843	28.01	50	+1
Free Democratic Party	216,664	23.72	48	–4
Conservative People's Party	185,052	20.26	42	–2
Party of Farmers, Traders and Independents	100,300	10.98	21	–9
Alliance of Independents	37,861	4.14	7	New
Liberal Democratic Party	30,476	3.34	6	0
Young Farmers	28,161	3.08	4	New
National Front	13,740	1.50	1	New
Communist Party	12,569	1.38	2	0
Liberal Socialist Party	11,078	1.21	0	New
Social-Political Group	10,665	1.17	3	+1
Evangelical People's Party	6,780	0.74	1	0
National Union	4,334	0.47	1	New
General People's List	4,334	0.47	1	New
Other parties	4,334	0.47	0	–
Total	913,523	100.00	187	0
Valid votes	913,523	97.62		
Invalid/blank votes	22,233	2.38		
Total votes	935,756	100.00		
Registered voters/turnout	1,194,910	78.31		
Source: Mackie & Rose, Nohlen & Stöver

==== By constituency ====
Constituency	Seats	Electorate	Turnout	Party	Votes	Seats won
Aargau	12	72,982	65,837	Social Democratic Party	271,446	4
Aargau	12	72,982	65,837	Conservative People's Party	166,454	3
Aargau	12	72,982	65,837	Party of Farmers, Traders and Independents	121,180	2
Aargau	12	72,982	65,837	Free Democratic Party	132,635	2
Aargau	12	72,982	65,837	Young Farmers	36,481	1
Aargau	12	72,982	65,837	Evangelical People's Party	28,117	0
Appenzell Ausserrhoden	2	13,702	10,849	Social Democratic Party	10,634	1
Appenzell Ausserrhoden	2	13,702	10,849	Free Democratic Party	4,975	1
Appenzell Ausserrhoden	2	13,702	10,849	Party of Farmers, Traders and Independents	4,184	0
Appenzell Innerrhoden	1	3,404	2,391	Conservative People's Party	1,244	1
Basel-Landschaft	4	27,020	17,822	Social Democratic Party	22,344	2
Basel-Landschaft	4	27,020	17,822	Free Democratic Party	18,749	2
Basel-Landschaft	4	27,020	17,822	Party of Farmers, Traders and Independents	6,949	0
Basel-Landschaft	4	27,020	17,822	Liberal Socialist Party	7,919	0
Basel-Landschaft	4	27,020	17,822	Conservative People's Party	7,618	0
Basel-Landschaft	4	27,020	17,822	Young Farmers	3,336	0
Basel-Landschaft	4	27,020	17,822	Communist Party	3,003	0
Basel-Landschaft	4	27,020	17,822	Action Committee for Interest Reduction	388	0
Basel-Stadt	7	49,161	35,357	Social Democratic Party	90,404	3
Basel-Stadt	7	49,161	35,357	Liberal Democratic Party	38,630	1
Basel-Stadt	7	49,161	35,357	Free Democratic Party	33,747	1
Basel-Stadt	7	49,161	35,357	Communist Party	28,530	1
Basel-Stadt	7	49,161	35,357	Conservative People's Party	26,362	1
Basel-Stadt	7	49,161	35,357	Party of Farmers, Traders and Independents	19,874	0
Basel-Stadt	7	49,161	35,357	Liberal Socialist Party	7,367	0
Bern	31	211,533	158,138	Social Democratic Party	1,642,382	11
Bern	31	211,533	158,138	Party of Farmers, Traders and Independents	1,451,157	11
Bern	31	211,533	158,138	Free Democratic Party	659,820	4
Bern	31	211,533	158,138	Young Farmers	490,181	3
Bern	31	211,533	158,138	Conservative People's Party	257,971	1
Bern	31	211,533	158,138	Ring of Independents	141,883	1
Bern	31	211,533	158,138	Liberal Socialist Party	121,249	0
Bern	31	211,533	158,138	National Front	75,276	0
Fribourg	7	40,416	31,752	Conservative People's Party	146,587	5
Fribourg	7	40,416	31,752	Free Democratic Party	54,497	0
Fribourg	7	40,416	31,752	Social Democratic Party	18,893	2
Geneva	8	48,044	32,026	Social Democratic Party	106,117	3
Geneva	8	48,044	32,026	Free Democratic Party	49,227	2
Geneva	8	48,044	32,026	Liberal Democratic Party	41,777	1
Geneva	8	48,044	32,026	Conservative People's Party	29,693	1
Geneva	8	48,044	32,026	National Union	21,655	1
Geneva	8	48,044	32,026	Communist Party	5,242	0
Geneva	8	48,044	32,026	New National Political Order	478	0
Glarus	2	10,147	8,223	Free Democratic Party	4,404	1
Glarus	2	10,147	8,223	Social Democratic Party	4,372	0
Glarus	2	10,147	8,223	Social-Political Group	4,006	1
Glarus	2	10,147	8,223	Conservative People's Party	3,375	0
Grisons	6	34,326	27,093	Conservative People's Party	55,718	3
Grisons	6	34,326	27,093	Social-Political Group	44,696	2
Grisons	6	34,326	27,093	Free Democratic Party	35,919	1
Grisons	6	34,326	27,093	Social Democratic Party	21,844	0
Lucerne	9	57,540	48,544	Conservative People's Party	220,461	5
Lucerne	9	57,540	48,544	Free Democratic Party	148,850	3
Lucerne	9	57,540	48,544	Social Democratic Party	59,349	1
Neuchâtel	6	36,216	25,453	Social Democratic Party	69,047	3
Neuchâtel	6	36,216	25,453	Free Democratic Party	36,773	2
Neuchâtel	6	36,216	25,453	Liberal Democratic Party	35,374	1
Neuchâtel	6	36,216	25,453	National Progressive Party	7,277	0
Nidwalden	1	4,284	2,960	Conservative People's Party	1,585	1
Obwalden	1	5,327	2,678	Conservative People's Party	1,543	1
Schaffhausen	2	14,351	13,055	Social Democratic Party	10,514	1
Schaffhausen	2	14,351	13,055	Free Democratic Party	6,178	1
Schaffhausen	2	14,351	13,055	Party of Farmers, Traders and Independents	5,395	0
Schaffhausen	2	14,351	13,055	National Front	3,087	
Schwyz	3	17,912	13,404	Conservative People's Party	20,678	2
Schwyz	3	17,912	13,404	Free Democratic Party	11,082	1
Schwyz	3	17,912	13,404	Social Democratic Party	7,892	0
Solothurn	7	43,523	36,213	Free Democratic Party	109,975	3
Solothurn	7	43,523	36,213	Social Democratic Party	74,351	2
Solothurn	7	43,523	36,213	Conservative People's Party	63,018	2
St. Gallen	13	74,437	65,565	Conservative People's Party	314,870	5
St. Gallen	13	74,437	65,565	Free Democratic Party	217,856	4
St. Gallen	13	74,437	65,565	Social Democratic Party	149,748	2
St. Gallen	13	74,437	65,565	Ring of Independents	66,571	1
St. Gallen	13	74,437	65,565	General People's List	28,953	1
St. Gallen	13	74,437	65,565	Young Farmers	27,747	0
Ticino	7	42,503	31,606	Free Democratic Party	104,980	3
Ticino	7	42,503	31,606	Conservative People's Party	79,659	3
Ticino	7	42,503	31,606	Social Democratic Party	33,795	1
Thurgau	6	38,283	31,290	Party of Farmers, Traders and Independents	43,168	2
Thurgau	6	38,283	31,290	Social Democratic Party	50,243	2
Thurgau	6	38,283	31,290	Conservative People's Party	34,301	1
Thurgau	6	38,283	31,290	Free Democratic Party	33,007	1
Thurgau	6	38,283	31,290	Young Farmers	14,793	0
Thurgau	6	38,283	31,290	Young Thurgau List	4,867	0
Uri	1	6,460	3,978	Free Democratic Party	3,007	1
Vaud	15	100,819	76,759	Free Democratic Party	416,231	6
Vaud	15	100,819	76,759	Social Democratic Party	322,373	4
Vaud	15	100,819	76,759	Liberal Democratic Party	207,626	3
Vaud	15	100,819	76,759	Party of Farmers, Traders and Independents	129,885	2
Vaud	15	100,819	76,759	Communist Party	23,780	0
Vaud	15	100,819	76,759	Independent Progressive Party	22,033	0
Valais	6	38,879	31,181	Conservative People's Party	115,862	4
Valais	6	38,879	31,181	Free Democratic Party	40,344	1
Valais	6	38,879	31,181	Social Democratic Party	26,512	1
Valais	6	38,879	31,181	Helvetic Action List	3,447	0
Zug	2	9,815	7,066	Conservative People's Party	6,495	1
Zug	2	9,815	7,066	Free Democratic Party	3,800	1
Zug	2	9,815	7,066	Social Democratic Party	3,236	0
Zürich	28	195,724	156,506	Social Democratic Party	1,282,080	9
Zürich	28	195,724	156,506	Ring of Independents	788,261	5
Zürich	28	195,724	156,506	Party of Farmers, Traders and Independents	567,477	4
Zürich	28	195,724	156,506	Free Democratic Party	434,764	3
Zürich	28	195,724	156,506	Social-Political Group	300,315	2
Zürich	28	195,724	156,506	Conservative People's Party	272,157	2
Zürich	28	195,724	156,506	National Front	158,978	1
Zürich	28	195,724	156,506	Communist Party	154,105	1
Zürich	28	195,724	156,506	Evangelical People's Party	124,235	1
Zürich	28	195,724	156,506	Liberal Socialist Party	115,787	0
Zürich	28	195,724	156,506	Young Farmers	108,623	0
Source: Bundesblatt, 4 December 1935

=== Council of the States ===
In several cantons the members of the Council of the States were chosen by the cantonal parliaments.

Party	Seats	+/–
Swiss Conservative People's Party	19	+1
Free Democratic Party	15	–4
Party of Farmers, Traders and Independents	3	0
Social Democratic Party	3	+1
Liberal Democratic Party	2	+1
Social-Political Group	0	0
Other parties	2	+1
Total	44	0
Source: Nohlen & Stöver

==== By canton ====
Constituency	Seats	Party	Elected members
Aargau	2	Conservative People's Party	Hans Fricker
Aargau	2	Free Democratic Party	Gottfried Keller
Appenzell Ausserrhoden	1	Free Democratic Party	Walter Ackermann
Appenzell Innerrhoden	1	Conservative People's Party	Carl Rusch
Basel-Landschaft	1	Social Democratic Party	Walter Schaub
Basel-Stadt	1	Social Democratic Party	Gustav Wenk
Bern	2	Free Democratic Party	Henri Mouttet
Bern	2	Party of Farmers, Traders and Independents	Jakob Rudolf Weber
Fribourg	2	Conservative People's Party	Joseph Piller
Fribourg	2	Conservative People's Party	Bernard Weck
Geneva	2	Free Democratic Party	Albert Malche
Geneva	2	Liberal Party	Auguste-Edouard-Frédéric Martin
Glarus	2	Social-Political Group	Edwin Hauser
Glarus	2	Free Democratic Party	Philippe Mercier
Grisons	2	Social-Political Group	Albert Lardelli
Grisons	2	Conservative People's Party	Georg Willi
Lucerne	2	Conservative People's Party	Gotthard Egli
Lucerne	2	Conservative People's Party	Albert Zust
Neuchâtel	2	Free Democratic Party	Ernest Béguin
Neuchâtel	2	Liberal Party	Marcel de Coulon
Nidwalden	1	Conservative People's Party	Anton Zumbühl
Obwalden	1	Conservative People's Party	Walter Amstalden
Schaffhausen	2	Free Democratic Party	Hans Käser
Schaffhausen	2	Party of Farmers, Traders and Independents	Johannes Winzeler
Schwyz	2	Conservative People's Party	Martin Ochsner
Schwyz	2	Conservative People's Party	Adolf Suter
Solothurn	2	Free Democratic Party	Hugo Dietschi
Solothurn	2	Free Democratic Party	Robert Schöpfer
St. Gallen	2	Free Democratic Party	Ernst Löpfe
St. Gallen	2	Conservative People's Party	Josef Schöbi
Ticino	2	Free Democratic Party	Arnaldo Luigi Bolla
Ticino	2	Conservative People's Party	Antonio Luigi Riva
Thurgau	2	Free Democratic Party	Paul Altwegg
Thurgau	2	Party of Farmers, Traders and Independents	Eduard Pfister
Uri	2	Conservative People's Party	Leo Meyer
Uri	2	Conservative People's Party	Ludwig Walker
Vaud	2	Free Democratic Party	Norbert Bosset
Vaud	2	Free Democratic Party	Louis Chamorel
Valais	2	Conservative People's Party	Pierre Barman
Valais	2	Conservative People's Party	Ramond Evéquoz
Zug	2	Conservative People's Party	Alphons Iten
Zug	2	Conservative People's Party	Alois Müller
Zürich	2	Social Democratic Party	Emil Klöti
Zürich	2	Free Democratic Party	Oskar Wettstein
