= Othmar Reichmuth =

Swiss politician

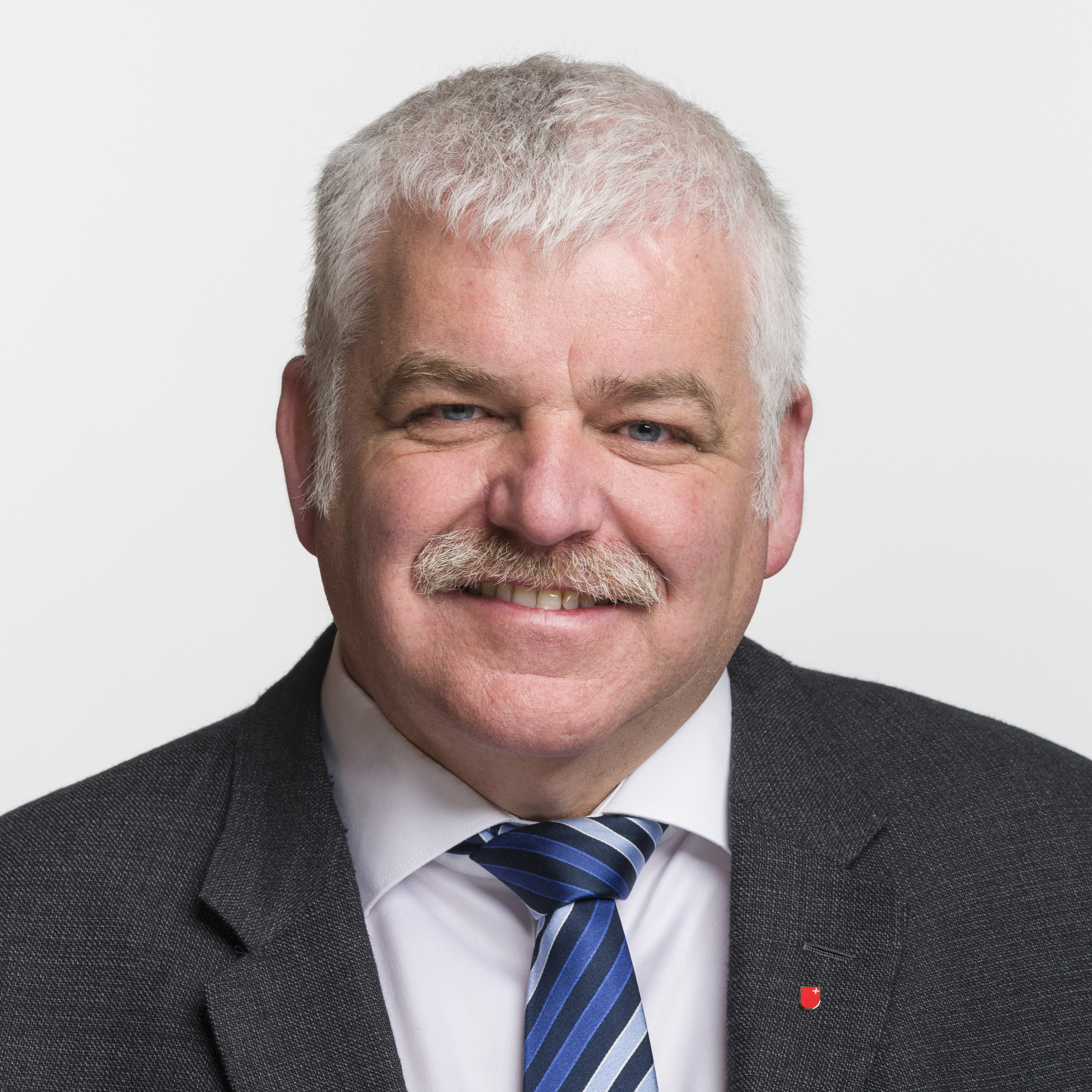
- 2019

Member of the Council of States of Switzerland
- Incumbent
- Assumed office 4 December 2019
- Constituency: Schwyz

Personal details
- Born: 24 January 1964 (age 62) Schwyz
- Party: The Centre
- Website: reichmuth-othmar.die-mitte.ch

Othmar Reichmuth is a Swiss politician who is a member of the Council of States.

== Biography ==
Reichmuth is a former wrestler and worked in business administration. He was elected in 2019.
