= 1928 Swiss federal election =

Federal elections were held in Switzerland on 28 October 1928. Although the Social Democratic Party received the most votes (by a margin of just six votes), the Free Democratic Party remained the largest party in the National Council, winning 58 of the 198 seats.

== Results ==
=== National Council ===
Party	Votes	%	Seats	+/–
Social Democratic Party	220,141	27.36	50	+1
Free Democratic Party	220,135	27.36	58	–2
Conservative People's Party	172,516	21.44	46	+4
Party of Farmers, Traders and Independents	126,961	15.78	31	+1
Liberal Democratic Party	23,752	2.95	6	–1
Communist Party	14,818	1.84	2	–1
Democratic Group	14,073	1.75	3	–2
Evangelical People's Party	5,618	0.70	1	0
Union for Economic Defence	6,593	0.82	1	0
Other parties	6,593	0.82	0	–
Total	804,607	100.00	198	0
Valid votes	804,607	97.84		
Invalid/blank votes	17,782	2.16		
Total votes	822,389	100.00		
Registered voters/turnout	1,043,823	78.79		
Source: Nohlen & Stöver

==== By constituency ====
Constituency	Seats	Electorate	Turnout	Party	Votes	Seats won
Aargau	12	65,815	58,902	Social Democratic Party	248,017	4
Aargau	12	65,815	58,902	Conservative People's Party	151,921	3
Aargau	12	65,815	58,902	Party of Farmers, Traders and Independents	146,601	3
Aargau	12	65,815	58,902	Free Democratic Party	137,541	2
Appenzell Ausserrhoden	3	Candidates nominated by the Regierungsrat		Free Democratic Party		2
Appenzell Ausserrhoden	3	Candidates nominated by the Regierungsrat		Social Democratic Party		1
Appenzell Innerrhoden	1	3,258	1,777	Conservative People's Party	1,190	1
Basel-Landschaft	4	24,081	14,442	Social Democratic Party	17,719	1
Basel-Landschaft	4	24,081	14,442	Free Democratic Party	15,846	1
Basel-Landschaft	4	24,081	14,442	Party of Farmers, Traders and Independents	9,225	1
Basel-Landschaft	4	24,081	14,442	Conservative People's Party	7,174	1
Basel-Landschaft	4	24,081	14,442	Communist Party	3,485	0
Basel-Landschaft	4	24,081	14,442	Debtors, Lessee and Tenants List	437	0
Basel-Stadt	7	39,427	28,664	Social Democratic Party	56,683	2
Basel-Stadt	7	39,427	28,664	Communist Party	39,609	1
Basel-Stadt	7	39,427	28,664	Free Democratic Party	23,272	1
Basel-Stadt	7	39,427	28,664	Liberal Democratic Party	24,384	1
Basel-Stadt	7	39,427	28,664	Conservative People's Party	21,464	1
Basel-Stadt	7	39,427	28,664	Party of Farmers, Traders and Independents	24,264	1
Basel-Stadt	7	39,427	28,664	Evangelical People's Party	7,327	0
Bern	34	189,331	142,431	Party of Farmers, Traders and Independents	2,039,776	15
Bern	34	189,331	142,431	Social Democratic Party	1,588,612	11
Bern	34	189,331	142,431	Free Democratic Party	849,581	6
Bern	34	189,331	142,431	Conservative People's Party	301,972	2
Bern	34	189,331	142,431	Communist Party	9,502	0
Fribourg	7	36,514	31,206	Conservative People's Party	140,925	5
Fribourg	7	36,514	31,206	Free Democratic Party	47,570	2
Fribourg	7	36,514	31,206	Social Democratic Party	16,479	0
Fribourg	7	36,514	31,206	Party of Farmers, Traders and Independents	11,887	0
Geneva	9	41,919	26,466	Social Democratic Party	86,402	3
Geneva	9	41,919	26,466	Free Democratic Party	51,423	2
Geneva	9	41,919	26,466	Liberal Democratic Party	40,340	2
Geneva	9	41,919	26,466	Conservative People's Party	29,382	1
Geneva	9	41,919	26,466	Union of Economic Defence and National Action	26,067	1
Geneva	9	41,919	26,466	Communist Party	1,752	0
Glarus	2	Candidates nominated by the Regierungsrat		Free Democratic Party		1
Glarus	2	Candidates nominated by the Regierungsrat		Social-Political Group		1
Grisons	6	30,751	24,341	Conservative People's Party	53,662	2
Grisons	6	30,751	24,341	Free Democratic Party	38,943	2
Grisons	6	30,751	24,341	Social-Political Group	32,197	1
Grisons	6	30,751	24,341	Social Democratic Party	18,546	1
Lucerne	9	50,483	43,273	Conservative People's Party	194,150	5
Lucerne	9	50,483	43,273	Free Democratic Party	140,285	3
Lucerne	9	50,483	43,273	Social Democratic Party	49,821	1
Neuchâtel	7	35,408	25,187	Social Democratic Party	72,206	3
Neuchâtel	7	35,408	25,187	Free Democratic Party	42,396	2
Neuchâtel	7	35,408	25,187	Liberal Democratic Party	30,330	1
Neuchâtel	7	35,408	25,187	National Progressive Party	23,730	1
Neuchâtel	7	35,408	25,187	Social-Political Group	5,830	0
Nidwalden	1	3,728	852	Conservative People's Party	800	1
Obwalden	1	4,812	1,123	Conservative People's Party	992	1
Schaffhausen	3	12,972	11,998	Party of Farmers, Traders and Independents	10,025	1
Schaffhausen	3	12,972	11,998	Communist Party	8,732	1
Schaffhausen	3	12,972	11,998	Free Democratic Party	8,475	1
Schaffhausen	3	12,972	11,998	Social Democratic Party	4,278	0
Schaffhausen	3	12,972	11,998	Conservative People's Party	2,516	0
Schwyz	3	16,563	13,521	Conservative People's Party	19,048	2
Schwyz	3	16,563	13,521	Free Democratic Party	12,840	1
Schwyz	3	16,563	13,521	Social Democratic Party	8,147	0
Solothurn	7	38,529	33,397	Free Democratic Party	106,528	3
Solothurn	7	38,529	33,397	Social Democratic Party	65,188	2
Solothurn	7	38,529	33,397	Conservative People's Party	58,643	2
St. Gallen	15	71,222	62,505	Conservative People's Party	370,988	7
St. Gallen	15	71,222	62,505	Free Democratic Party	273,047	5
St. Gallen	15	71,222	62,505	Social Democratic Party	197,546	3
St. Gallen	15	71,222	62,505	Social-Political Group	38,886	0
St. Gallen	15	71,222	62,505	Democratic Progressive Party	15,647	0
Ticino	8	36,387	27,148	Free Democratic Party	94,593	4
Ticino	8	36,387	27,148	Conservative People's Party	76,677	3
Ticino	8	36,387	27,148	Social Democratic Party	29,016	1
Ticino	8	36,387	27,148	Agrarian Popular Group	14,241	0
Ticino	8	36,387	27,148	Communist Party	782	0
Thurgau	7	34,386	30,009	Party of Farmers, Traders and Independents	65,712	3
Thurgau	7	34,386	30,009	Social Democratic Party	48,640	2
Thurgau	7	34,386	30,009	Conservative People's Party	39,818	1
Thurgau	7	34,386	30,009	Free Democratic Party	31,984	1
Thurgau	7	34,386	30,009	Social-Political Group	19,080	0
Uri	1	5,931	2,752	Free Democratic Party	1,796	1
Vaud	16	88,307	72,941	Free Democratic Party	508,519	8
Vaud	16	88,307	72,941	Social Democratic Party	279,667	4
Vaud	16	88,307	72,941	Liberal Democratic Party	183,270	2
Vaud	16	88,307	72,941	Party of Farmers, Traders and Independents	148,197	2
Vaud	16	88,307	72,941	Communist Party	5,456	0
Valais	6	36,079	30,492	Conservative People's Party	123,473	5
Valais	6	36,079	30,492	Free Democratic Party	34,488	1
Valais	6	36,079	30,492	Social Democratic Party	24,234	0
Zug	2	8,619	6,522	Conservative People's Party	5,639	1
Zug	2	8,619	6,522	Free Democratic Party	4,211	1
Zug	2	8,619	6,522	Social Democratic Party	2,894	0
Zürich	27	168,726	132,656	Social Democratic Party	1,327,330	11
Zürich	27	168,726	132,656	Party of Farmers, Traders and Independents	634,764	5
Zürich	27	168,726	132,656	Free Democratic Party	609,874	5
Zürich	27	168,726	132,656	Social-Political Group	399,968	3
Zürich	27	168,726	132,656	Conservative People's Party	254,307	2
Zürich	27	168,726	132,656	Evangelical People's Party	123,421	1
Zürich	27	168,726	132,656	Communist Party	120,550	0
Zürich	27	168,726	132,656	Free Evangelical Social List	31,997	0
Source: Bundesblatt, 23 November 1928

=== Council of States ===
In several cantons the members of the Council of States were chosen by the cantonal parliaments.

Party	Seats	+/–
Free Democratic Party	20	–1
Swiss Conservative People's Party	18	0
Party of Farmers, Traders and Independents	3	+2
Democratic Group	1	0
Liberal Democratic Party	1	0
Social Democratic Party	0	–2
Other parties	1	+1
Total	44	0
Source: Nohlen & Stöver

==== By canton ====
Constituency	Seats	Party	Elected members
Aargau	2	Free Democratic Party	Gottfried Keller
Aargau	2	Free Democratic Party	Peter Emil Isler
Appenzell Ausserrhoden	1	Free Democratic Party	Johannes Baumann
Appenzell Innerrhoden	1	Conservative People's Party	Carl Rusch
Basel-Landschaft	1	Free Democratic Party	Gustav Johann Schneider
Basel-Stadt	1	Free Democratic Party	Ernst-Alfred Thalmann
Bern	2	Free Democratic Party	Paul Charmillot
Bern	2	Party of Farmers, Traders and Independents	Carl Moser
Fribourg	2	Conservative People's Party	Emile Savoy
Fribourg	2	Conservative People's Party	Bernard Weck
Geneva	2	Free Democratic Party	Alexandre Moriaud
Geneva	2	Union for Economic Defence	Jean-Martin Naef
Glarus	2	Democratic Group	Edwin Hauser
Glarus	2	Free Democratic Party	Philippe Mercier
Grisons	2	Conservative People's Party	Friedrich Brügger
Grisons	2	Free Democratic Party	Andreas Laely
Lucerne	2	Conservative People's Party	Jakob Sigrist
Lucerne	2	Conservative People's Party	Josef Winiger
Neuchâtel	2	Free Democratic Party	Ernest Béguin
Neuchâtel	2	Liberal Party	Pierre de Meuron
Nidwalden	1	Conservative People's Party	Anton Zumbühl
Obwalden	1	Conservative People's Party	Walter Amstalden
Schaffhausen	2	Free Democratic Party	Heinrich Bolli
Schaffhausen	2	Party of Farmers, Traders and Independents	Johannes Winzeler
Schwyz	2	Conservative People's Party	Martin Ochsner
Schwyz	2	Conservative People's Party	Adolf Suter
Solothurn	2	Free Democratic Party	Hugo Dietschi
Solothurn	2	Free Democratic Party	Robert Schöpfer
St. Gallen	2	Free Democratic Party	Johannes Geel
St. Gallen	2	Conservative People's Party	Anton August Messmer
Ticino	2	Free Democratic Party	Brenno Bertoni
Ticino	2	Conservative People's Party	Antonio Luigi Riva
Thurgau	2	Free Democratic Party	Albert Böhi
Thurgau	2	Party of Farmers, Traders and Independents	Anton Schmid
Uri	2	Conservative People's Party	Isidor Meyer
Uri	2	Conservative People's Party	Ludwig Walker
Vaud	2	Free Democratic Party	Norbert Bosset
Vaud	2	Free Democratic Party	Émile Dind
Valais	2	Conservative People's Party	Pierre Barman
Valais	2	Conservative People's Party	Ramond Evéquoz
Zug	2	Conservative People's Party	Josef Andermatt
Zug	2	Conservative People's Party	Josef Hildebrand
Zürich	2	Free Democratic Party	Gustav Keller
Zürich	2	Free Democratic Party	Oskar Wettstein
