= Social-Political Group =

Defunct Swiss political party

The Social-Political Group (French: Group de politique sociale; German: Sozialpolitische Gruppe) was a political faction in Switzerland.

== History ==
The faction was originally known as the Democratic Group, and consisted of a coalition of parties from different cantons, including the Extreme Left party (Italian: Estrema Sinistra) from Ticino and the Democratic Group from Graubünden.

In the 1919 federal elections, the faction won four seats. Although it was reduced to three seats in the 1922 elections, it won five seats in the 1925 elections. However, it was reduced back to three seats after the 1928 elections. In 1931, the faction was renamed the Social-Political Group, and won only two seats in the elections that year. In 1935, it won three seats, and in "silent elections" of 1939, it won five. It retained all five seats in the 1943 and 1947 elections, but was reduced to four seats in the 1951 elections. The faction retained its four-seat strength in elections in 1955, 1959 and 1963, before being reduced to three seats in the 1967 elections.

In 1971, before the elections that year, the faction split into two. The Glarus and Graubunden branches merged with the Party of Farmers, Traders and Independents to form the Swiss People's Party, while the rest of the group merged into the Free Democratic Party.
