= 1931 Swiss federal election =

Federal elections were held in Switzerland on 25 October 1931. Although the Social Democratic Party received the most votes, the Free Democratic Party remained the largest party in the National Council, winning 52 of the 187 seats.

== Results ==
=== National Council ===
Party	Votes	%	Seats	+/–
Social Democratic Party	247,946	28.72	49	–1
Free Democratic Party	232,562	26.94	52	–6
Conservative People's Party	184,602	21.38	44	–2
Party of Farmers, Traders and Independents	131,809	15.27	30	–1
Liberal Democratic Party	24,573	2.85	6	0
Communist Party	12,778	1.48	2	0
Social-Political Group	10,726	1.24	2	–1
Evangelical People's Party	8,454	0.98	1	0
Communist Party Opposition	9,841	1.14	1	New
Other parties	9,841	1.14	0	–
Total	863,291	100.00	187	–11
Valid votes	863,291	97.89		
Invalid/blank votes	18,645	2.11		
Total votes	881,936	100.00		
Registered voters/turnout	1,118,841	78.83		
Source: Nohlen & Stöver

==== By constituency ====
Constituency	Seats	Electorate	Turnout	Party	Votes	Seats won
Aargau	12	68,872	62,316	Social Democratic Party	255,276	4
Aargau	12	68,872	62,316	Conservative People's Party	161,958	3
Aargau	12	68,872	62,316	Party of Farmers, Traders and Independents	161,683	3
Aargau	12	68,872	62,316	Free Democratic Party	143,225	2
Aargau	12	68,872	62,316	Communist Party	6,105	0
Appenzell Ausserrhoden	2	13,125	10,115	Free Democratic Party	10,717	1
Appenzell Ausserrhoden	2	13,125	10,115	Social Democratic Party	6,046	1
Appenzell Ausserrhoden	2	13,125	10,115	Independent List	2,143	0
Appenzell Innerrhoden	1	3,306	1,701	Conservative People's Party	1,355	1
Basel-Landschaft	4	25,236	15,748	Social Democratic Party	23,051	1
Basel-Landschaft	4	25,236	15,748	Free Democratic Party	18,292	2
Basel-Landschaft	4	25,236	15,748	Party of Farmers, Traders and Independents	9,444	1
Basel-Landschaft	4	25,236	15,748	Conservative People's Party	7,664	0
Basel-Landschaft	4	25,236	15,748	Communist Party	3,143	0
Basel-Stadt	7	43,535	28,732	Social Democratic Party	62,464	2
Basel-Stadt	7	43,535	28,732	Communist Party	30,084	1
Basel-Stadt	7	43,535	28,732	Free Democratic Party	30,044	1
Basel-Stadt	7	43,535	28,732	Liberal Democratic Party	25,258	1
Basel-Stadt	7	43,535	28,732	Conservative People's Party	23,502	1
Basel-Stadt	7	43,535	28,732	Party of Farmers, Traders and Independents	20,967	1
Basel-Stadt	7	43,535	28,732	Evangelical People's Party	6,801	0
Bern	31	197,392	156,998	Party of Farmers, Traders and Independents	2,082,207	15
Bern	31	197,392	156,998	Social Democratic Party	1,618,792	10
Bern	31	197,392	156,998	Free Democratic Party	817,738	5
Bern	31	197,392	156,998	Conservative People's Party	276,736	1
Bern	31	197,392	156,998	Communist Party	10,305	0
Fribourg	7	37,447	31,337	Conservative People's Party	146,564	6
Fribourg	7	37,447	31,337	Free Democratic Party	45,078	1
Fribourg	7	37,447	31,337	Social Democratic Party	16,843	0
Fribourg	7	37,447	31,337	Party of Farmers, Traders and Independents	9,157	0
Geneva	8	45,829	26,496	Free Democratic Party	86,202	2
Geneva	8	45,829	26,496	Social Democratic Party	84,916	4
Geneva	8	45,829	26,496	Liberal Democratic Party	29,743	1
Geneva	8	45,829	26,496	Conservative People's Party	24,261	1
Geneva	8	45,829	26,496	National Political Order	20,904	0
Geneva	8	45,829	26,496	Union of Economic Defence and National Action	10,769	0
Geneva	8	45,829	26,496	Communist Party	2,058	0
Glarus	2	9,742	7,826	Free Democratic Party	5,951	1
Glarus	2	9,742	7,826	Social-Political Group	3,725	1
Glarus	2	9,742	7,826	Social Democratic Party	3,708	0
Glarus	2	9,742	7,826	Conservative People's Party	1,875	0
Grisons	6	31,867	25,212	Conservative People's Party	55,469	2
Grisons	6	31,867	25,212	Free Democratic Party	40,081	2
Grisons	6	31,867	25,212	Social-Political Group	28,203	1
Grisons	6	31,867	25,212	Social Democratic Party	24,765	1
Lucerne	9	52,702	46,672	Conservative People's Party	205,122	4
Lucerne	9	52,702	46,672	Free Democratic Party	161,805	3
Lucerne	9	52,702	46,672	Social Democratic Party	46,728	1
Lucerne	9	52,702	46,672	Communist Party	982	0
Neuchâtel	6	35,930	27,597	Social Democratic Party	72,158	3
Neuchâtel	6	35,930	27,597	Free Democratic Party	41,386	2
Neuchâtel	6	35,930	27,597	Liberal Democratic Party	30,511	1
Neuchâtel	6	35,930	27,597	National Progressive Party	14,124	0
Neuchâtel	6	35,930	27,597	Social-Political Group	4,542	0
Neuchâtel	6	35,930	27,597	Communist Party	1,179	0
Nidwalden	1	3,850	1,047	Conservative People's Party	965	1
Obwalden	1	4,975	1,247	Conservative People's Party	1,122	1
Schaffhausen	2	17,106	15,143	Social Democratic Party	13,425	1
Schaffhausen	2	17,106	15,143	Free Democratic Party	8,610	1
Schaffhausen	2	17,106	15,143	Party of Farmers, Traders and Independents	4,625	0
Schaffhausen	2	17,106	15,143	Conservative People's Party	2,484	0
Schwyz	3	17,088	13,919	Conservative People's Party	21,204	2
Schwyz	3	17,088	13,919	Free Democratic Party	11,603	1
Schwyz	3	17,088	13,919	Social Democratic Party	8,032	0
Solothurn	7	40,432	35,932	Free Democratic Party	110,663	3
Solothurn	7	40,432	35,932	Social Democratic Party	71,073	2
Solothurn	7	40,432	35,932	Conservative People's Party	63,109	2
St. Gallen	13	71,564	63,799	Conservative People's Party	351,573	6
St. Gallen	13	71,564	63,799	Free Democratic Party	247,770	4
St. Gallen	13	71,564	63,799	Social Democratic Party	173,719	3
St. Gallen	13	71,564	63,799	Evangelical People's Party	21,164	0
St. Gallen	13	71,564	63,799	Communist Party	2,961	0
Ticino	7	39,004	27,792	Free Democratic Party	88,287	3
Ticino	7	39,004	27,792	Conservative People's Party	77,530	3
Ticino	7	39,004	27,792	Social Democratic Party	30,377	1
Ticino	7	39,004	27,792	Communist Party	859	0
Thurgau	6	35,759	30,499	Party of Farmers, Traders and Independents	61,404	3
Thurgau	6	35,759	30,499	Social Democratic Party	45,722	1
Thurgau	6	35,759	30,499	Conservative People's Party	34,632	1
Thurgau	6	35,759	30,499	Free Democratic Party	26,727	1
Thurgau	6	35,759	30,499	Social-Political Group	10,856	0
Uri	1	5,879	2,618	Free Democratic Party	1,863	1
Vaud	15	92,480	71,352	Free Democratic Party	457,401	7
Vaud	15	92,480	71,352	Social Democratic Party	291,725	4
Vaud	15	92,480	71,352	Liberal Democratic Party	182,423	3
Vaud	15	92,480	71,352	Party of Farmers, Traders and Independents	102,386	1
Vaud	15	92,480	71,352	Communist Party	7,577	0
Valais	6	37,163	32,169	Conservative People's Party	131,242	5
Valais	6	37,163	32,169	Free Democratic Party	39,904	1
Valais	6	37,163	32,169	Social Democratic Party	21,130	0
Zug	2	9,189	6,872	Conservative People's Party	6,225	1
Zug	2	9,189	6,872	Free Democratic Party	3,676	1
Zug	2	9,189	6,872	Social Democratic Party	3,430	0
Zürich	28	184,189	141,350	Social Democratic Party	1,554,439	11
Zürich	28	184,189	141,350	Party of Farmers, Traders and Independents	665,421	5
Zürich	28	184,189	141,350	Free Democratic Party	592,596	5
Zürich	28	184,189	141,350	Social-Political Group	408,802	3
Zürich	28	184,189	141,350	Conservative People's Party	302,404	2
Zürich	28	184,189	141,350	Evangelical People's Party	163,919	1
Zürich	28	184,189	141,350	Communist Party	148,514	1
Zürich	28	184,189	141,350	Federal Front	33,359	0
Source: Bundesblatt, 2 December 1931

=== Council of States ===
In several cantons the members of the Council of States were chosen by the cantonal parliaments.

Party	Seats	+/–
Free Democratic Party	19	–1
Swiss Conservative People's Party	18	0
Party of Farmers, Traders and Independents	3	0
Social Democratic Party	2	+2
Liberal Democratic Party	1	0
Social-Political Group	1	0
Other parties	0	0
Total	44	0
Source: Nohlen & Stöver

==== By constituency ====
Constituency	Seats	Party	Elected members
Aargau	2	Free Democratic Party	Gottfried Keller
Aargau	2	Free Democratic Party	Peter Emil Isler
Appenzell Ausserrhoden	1	Free Democratic Party	Johannes Baumann
Appenzell Innerrhoden	1	Conservative People's Party	Carl Rusch
Basel-Landschaft	1	Free Democratic Party	Gustav Johann Schneider
Basel-Stadt	1	Free Democratic Party	Ernst-Alfred Thalmann
Bern	2	Free Democratic Party	Paul Charmillot
Bern	2	Party of Farmers, Traders and Independents	Carl Moser
Fribourg	2	Conservative People's Party	Emile Savoy
Fribourg	2	Conservative People's Party	Bernard Weck
Geneva	2	Social Democratic Party	Charles Burklin
Geneva	2	Free Democratic Party	Albert Malche
Glarus	2	Social-Political Group	Edwin Hauser
Glarus	2	Free Democratic Party	Philippe Mercier
Grisons	2	Conservative People's Party	Johann Josef Huonder
Grisons	2	Free Democratic Party	Andreas Laely
Lucerne	2	Conservative People's Party	Jakob Sigrist
Lucerne	2	Conservative People's Party	Albert Zust
Neuchâtel	2	Free Democratic Party	Ernest Béguin
Neuchâtel	2	Liberal Party	Pierre de Meuron
Nidwalden	1	Conservative People's Party	Anton Zumbühl
Obwalden	1	Conservative People's Party	Walter Amstalden
Schaffhausen	2	Free Democratic Party	Heinrich Bolli
Schaffhausen	2	Party of Farmers, Traders and Independents	Johannes Winzeler
Schwyz	2	Conservative People's Party	Martin Ochsner
Schwyz	2	Conservative People's Party	Adolf Suter
Solothurn	2	Free Democratic Party	Hugo Dietschi
Solothurn	2	Free Democratic Party	Robert Schöpfer
St. Gallen	2	Free Democratic Party	Ernst Löpfe
St. Gallen	2	Conservative People's Party	Anton August Messmer
Ticino	2	Free Democratic Party	Brenno Bertoni
Ticino	2	Conservative People's Party	Antonio Luigi Riva
Thurgau	2	Free Democratic Party	Albert Böhi
Thurgau	2	Party of Farmers, Traders and Independents	Anton Schmid
Uri	2	Conservative People's Party	Isidor Meyer
Uri	2	Conservative People's Party	Ludwig Walker
Vaud	2	Free Democratic Party	Norbert Bosset
Vaud	2	Free Democratic Party	Louis Chamorel
Valais	2	Conservative People's Party	Pierre Barman
Valais	2	Conservative People's Party	Ramond Evéquoz
Zug	2	Conservative People's Party	Philipp Etter
Zug	2	Conservative People's Party	Josef Hildebrand
Zürich	2	Free Democratic Party	Oskar Wettstein
Zürich	2	Social Democratic Party	Emil Klöti
