= 1875 Swiss federal election =

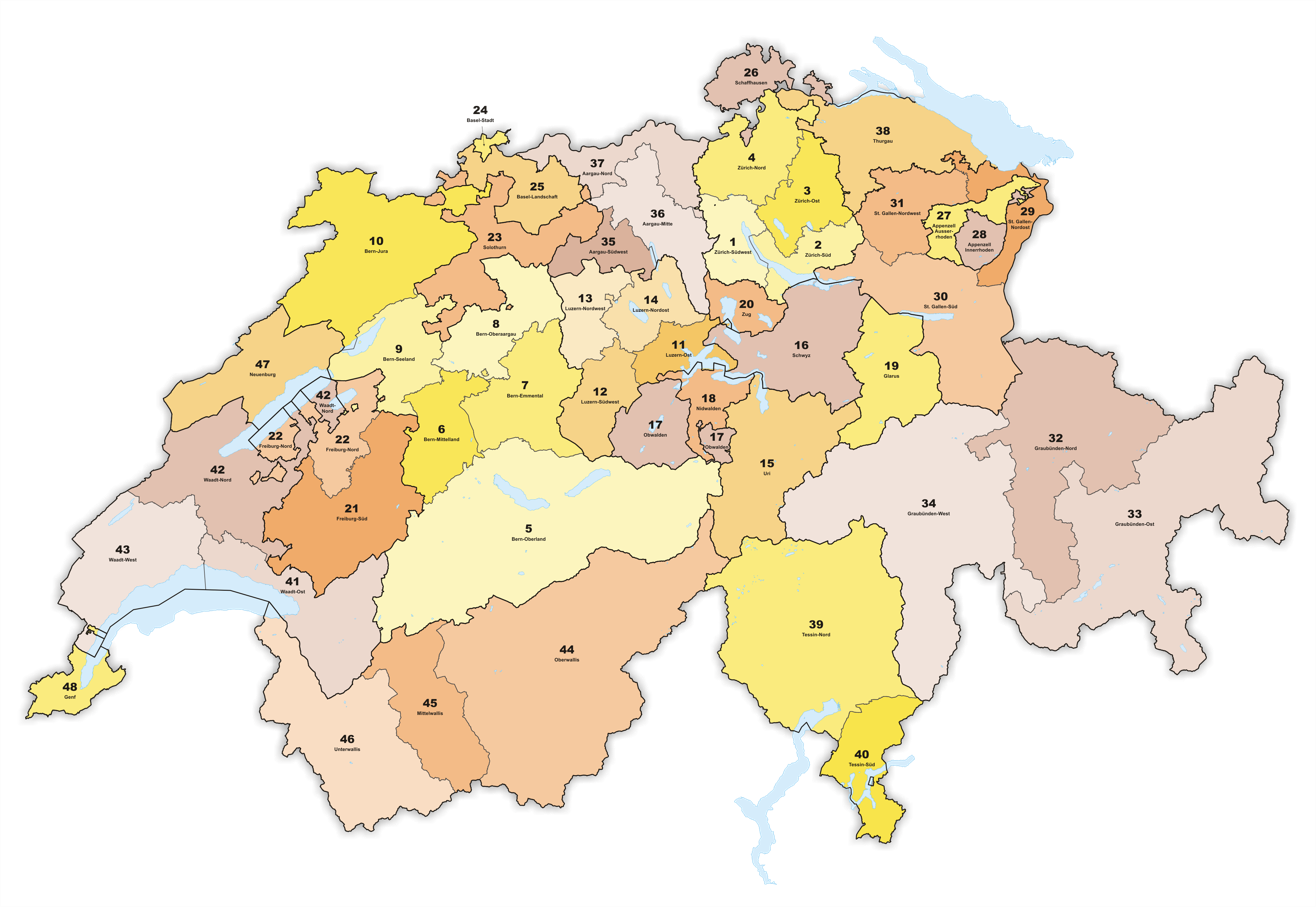
The 48 electoral districts

Federal elections were held in Switzerland on 31 October 1875. The Radical Left remained the largest group in the National Council.

== Electoral system ==
The 135 members of the National Council were elected in 48 single- and multi-member constituencies using a three-round system. Candidates had to receive a majority in the first or second round to be elected; if it went to a third round, only a plurality was required. Voters could cast as many votes as there were seats in their constituency. There was one seat for every 20,000 citizens, with seats allocated to cantons in proportion to their population.

== Results ==
=== National Council ===
Voter turnout was highest in Aargau at 85.6% (higher than the 73.7% who voted in Schaffhausen, where voting was compulsory) and lowest in Zug at 31.4%.

Party	Votes	%	Seats	+/–
Radical Left		38.2	63	+3
Liberal Centre		25.7	33	+3
Catholic Right		17.9	22	–5
Democratic Left		11.7	15	0
Evangelical Right		4.8	2	–1
Socialists		0.1	0	New
Independents		1.6	0	0
Total			135	0
Total votes	375,666	–		
Registered voters/turnout	635,745	59.09		
Source: BFS (seats)

==== By constituency ====
Constituency	Seats	Party	Seats won	Elected members
Zürich 1	5	Liberal Centre	5	Alfred Escher; Johann Jakob Widmer; Melchior Römer; Heinrich Studer; Wilhelm Hertenstein
Zürich 2	3	Democratic Left	2	Rudolf Zinggeler; Johann Jakob Keller
Zürich 2	3	Liberal Centre	1	Johann Jakob Hasler
Zürich 3	3	Democratic Left	3	Gottlieb Ziegler; Salomon Bleuler; Friedrich Salomon Vögelin
Zürich 4	3	Democratic Left	3	Johann Jakob Scherer; Friedrich Scheuchzer; Johannes Moser
Bern 5	5	Radical Left	5	Wilhelm Teuscher; Johannes Ritschard; Jakob Scherz; Carl Samuel Zyro; Friedrich Seiler
Bern 6	4	Radical Left	3	Rudolf Rohr; Rudolf Brunner; Friedrich von Werdt
Bern 6	4	Evangelical Right	1	Otto von Büren
Bern 7	4	Radical Left	4	Karl Karrer; Gottlieb Riem; Gottfried Joost; Karl Schenk
Bern 8	4	Radical Left	4	Johann Bützberger; Albert Friedrich Born; Alexander Bucher; Rudolf Leuenberger
Bern 9	3	Radical Left	3	Jakob Stämpfli; Eduard Marti; Friedrich Eggli
Bern 10	5	Radical Left	5	Auguste-Adolphe Klaye; Pierre Jolissaint; Niklaus Kaiser; Hippolyte Paulet; Paul Migy
Lucerne 11	2	Radical Left	1	Josef Vonmatt
Lucerne 11	2	Liberal Centre	1	Joseph Zingg
Lucerne 12	1	Catholic Right	1	Josef Zemp
Lucerne 13	2	Catholic Right	2	Vinzenz Fischer; Johann Amberg
Lucerne 14	2	Catholic Right	2	Franz Xaver Beck; Philipp Anton von Segesser
Uri 15	1	Catholic Right	1	Josef Arnold
Schwyz 16	2	Catholic Right	2	Fridolin Holdener; Ambros Eberle
Obwalden 17	1	Catholic Right	1	Alois Reinert
Nidwalden 18	1	Catholic Right	1	Robert Durrer
Glarus 19	2	Liberal Centre	1	Joachim Heer
Glarus 19	2	Radical Left	1	Niklaus Tschudi
Zug 20	1	Catholic Right	1	Alois Schwerzmann
Fribourg 21	3	Catholic Right	3	Louis de Weck; Laurent Chaney; Arthur Techtermann
Fribourg 22	3	Catholic Right	3	Joseph Jaquet; Louis Grand; Louis de Wuilleret
Solothurn 23	4	Radical Left	3	Leo Weber; Hermann Dietler; Simon Kaiser
Solothurn 23	4	Liberal Centre	1	Carl Franz Bally
Basel-Stadt 24	2	Radical Left	2	Karl Burckhardt-Iselin; Wilhelm Klein
Basel-Landschaft 25	3	Radical Left	1	Jakob Bernhard Graf
Basel-Landschaft 25	3	Democratic Left	1	Emil Frey
Basel-Landschaft 25	3	Liberal Centre	1	Gédéon Thommen
Schaffhausen 26	2	Democratic Left	2	Heinrich Gustav Schoch; Wilhelm Joos
Appenzell Ausserrhoden 27	2	Radical Left	2	Christian Graf; Johann Georg Tanner
Appenzell Innerhoden 28	1	Catholic Right	1	Alois Broger
St. Gallen 29	4	Liberal Centre	2	Arnold Otto Aepli; Daniel Wirth-Sand
St. Gallen 29	4	Democratic Left	2	Gustav Adolf Saxer; Thomas Thoma
St. Gallen 30	3	Radical Left	2	Johann Baptist Gaudy; Johann Josef Huber
St. Gallen 30	3	Liberal Centre	1	Rudolf Hilty
St. Gallen 31	3	Catholic Right	2	Johann Fridolin Müller; Johann Joseph Keel
St. Gallen 31	3	Evangelical Right	1	Samuel Friedrich Rikli
Grisons 32	2	Liberal Centre	1	Simeon Bavier
Grisons 32	2	Radical Left	1	Johann Gaudenz von Salis
Grisons 33	2	Catholic Right	1	Johann R. von Toggenburg
Grisons 33	2	Radical Left	1	Anton Steinhauser
Grisons 34	1	Radical Left	1	Johann Albert Romedi
Aargau 35	3	Liberal Centre	2	Carl Feer-Herzog; Johann Haberstich
Aargau 35	3	Radical Left	1	Arnold Künzli
Aargau 36	4	Radical Left	3	Peter Suter; Theodor Haller; Robert Straub
Aargau 36	4	Liberal Centre	1	Hans Weber
Aargau 37	3	Catholic Right	2	Karl von Schmid; Arnold Münch
Aargau 37	3	Liberal Centre	1	Emil Welti
Thurgau 38	5	Radical Left	2	Friedrich Heinrich Häberlin; Gustav Merkle
Thurgau 38	5	Democratic Left	2	Jakob Albert Scherb; Severin Stoffel
Thurgau 38	5	Liberal Centre	1	Johann Messmer
Ticino 39	3	Catholic Right	3	Massimiliano Magatti; Bernardino Lurati; Carlo Pasta
Ticino 40	3	Catholic Right	3	Michele Pedrazzini; Carlo Vonmentlen; Agostino Gatti
Vaud 41	4	Liberal Centre	2	Jakob Dubs; Louis Berdez
Vaud 41	4	Radical Left	2	Louis Ruchonnet; Frédéric Chausson
Vaud 42	4	Liberal Centre	2	Jean-Louis Demiéville; Pierre-Isaac Joly
Vaud 42	4	Radical Left	2	Paul Wulliémoz; Georges-Louis Contesse
Vaud 43	3	Radical Left	3	Louis-Henri Delarageaz; Henri Reymond; Charles Baud
Valais 44	2	Catholic Right	2	Hans Anton von Roten; Victor de Chastonay
Valais 45	1	Catholic Right	1	Ferdinand de Montheys
Valais 46	2	Radical Left	2	Louis Barman; Alexandre Dénériaz
Neuchâtel 47	5	Radical Left	5	Fritz Berthoud; Édouard Desor; Jules Philippin; Louis Constant Lambelet; Fritz Rüsser
Geneva 48	4	Radical Left	4	Jean-Jacques Challet-Venel; Antoine Carteret; Charles Chalumeau; Moïse Vautier
Source: Gruner

=== Council of States ===
Party	Seats	+/–
Catholic Right	16	+1
Radical Left	11	0
Liberal Centre	9	–1
Democratic Left	4	+1
Evangelical Right	0	0
Independents	3	–1
Vacant	1	0
Total	44	0
Source: The Federal Assembly
