= 1866 Swiss federal election =

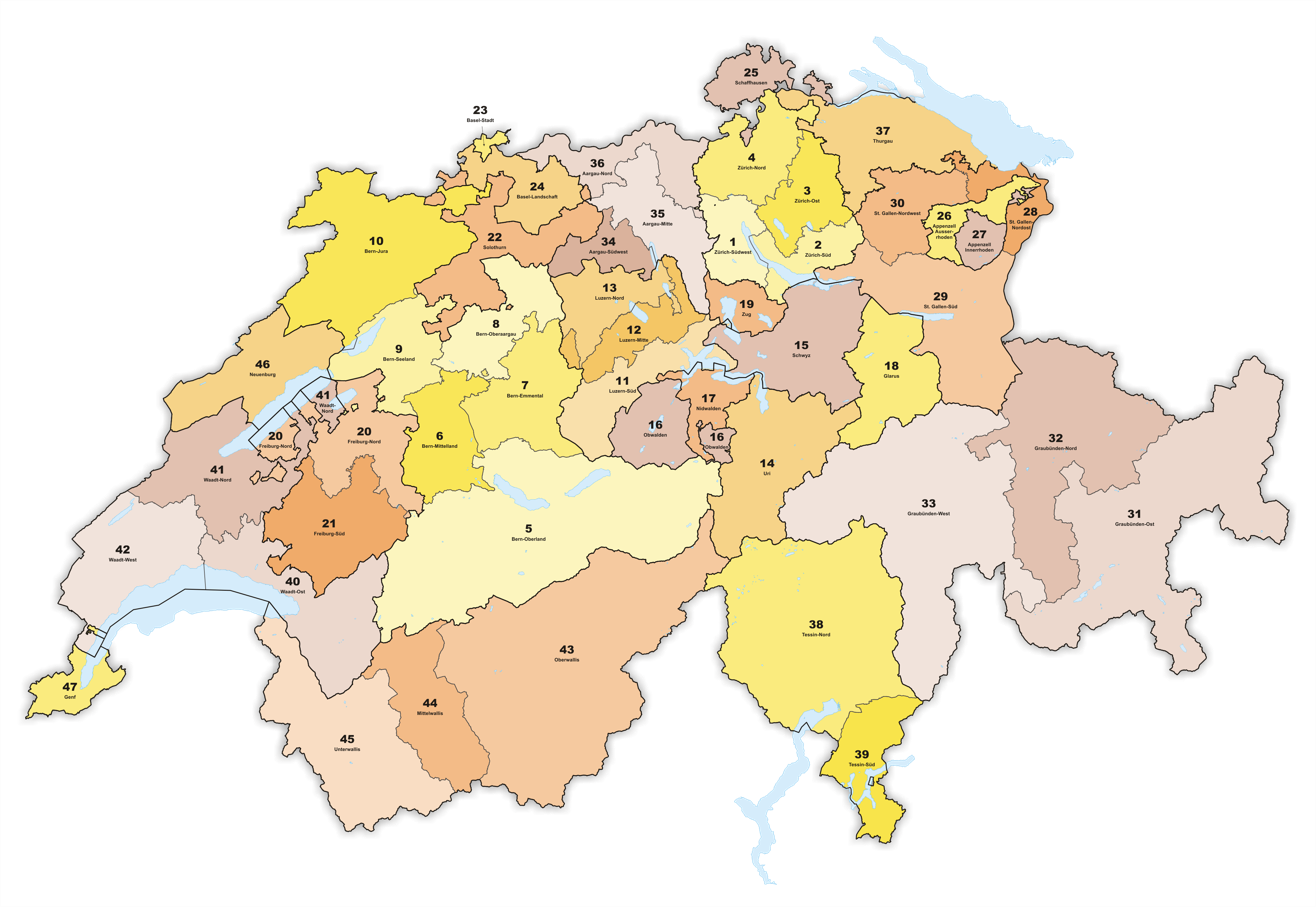
The 47 electoral districts

Federal elections were held in Switzerland on 28 October 1866. The Radical Left remained the largest group in the National Council.

== Electoral system ==
The 128 members of the National Council were elected in 47 single- and multi-member constituencies; there was one seat for every 20,000 citizens, with seats allocated to cantons in proportion to their population. The elections were held using a three-round system; candidates had to receive a majority in the first or second round to be elected; if it went to a third round, only a plurality was required. Voters could cast as many votes as there were seats in their constituency. In six cantons (Appenzell Innerrhoden, Appenzell Ausserrhoden, Glarus, Nidwalden, Obwalden and Uri), National Council members were elected by the Landsgemeinde.

== Results ==
=== National Council ===
Voter turnout was highest in the Canton of Schaffhausen (where voting was compulsory) at 86.3% and lowest in the Canton of Schwyz at 18.7%.

Party	Votes	%	Seats	+/–
Radical Left		39.6	53	–6
Liberal Centre		28.4	39	+2
Catholic Right		17.0	21	0
Democratic Left		10.5	11	+5
Evangelical Right		2.9	4	–1
Independents		1.6	0	0
Total			128	0
Total votes	284,020	–		
Registered voters/turnout	561,669	50.57		
Source: BFS

==== By constituency ====
Constituency	Seats	Party	Seats won	Elected members
Zürich 1	4	Liberal Centre	3	Jakob Dubs; Alfred Escher; Johann Jakob Treichler
Zürich 1	4	Democratic Left	1	Hans Rudolf Zangger
Zürich 2	3	Liberal Centre	3	Johann Heinrich Fierz; Heinrich Honegger; Johann Jakob Widmer
Zürich 3	3	Liberal Centre	2	Heinrich Grunholzer; Eduard Suter
Zürich 3	3	Democratic Left	1	Johann Jakob Sulzer
Zürich 4	3	Democratic Left	2	Friedrich Scheuchzer; Jakob Fehr
Zürich 4	3	Liberal Centre	1	Rudolf Benz
Bern 5	4	Radical Left	4	Carl Samuel Zyro; Friedrich Seiler; Johann Jakob Karlen; Jakob Scherz
Bern 6	4	Evangelical Right	4	Otto von Büren; Rudolf Brunner; August von Gonzenbach; Samuel Steiner
Bern 7	4	Radical Left	4	Karl Karrer; Samuel Lehmann; Ludwig Wyss; Karl Schenk
Bern 8	4	Radical Left	4	Johann Bützberger; Johann Rudolf Vogel; Johann Weber; Jakob Leuenberger
Bern 9	3	Radical Left	3	Eduard Marti; Jakob Stämpfli; Friedrich Eggli
Bern 10	4	Radical Left	4	Édouard Carlin; Niklaus Kaiser; Cyprien Revel; Paul Migy
Lucerne 11	2	Liberal Centre	1	Josef Martin Knüsel
Lucerne 11	2	Radical Left	1	Josef Bucher
Lucerne 12	2	Catholic Right	2	Philipp Anton von Segesser; Vinzenz Fischer
Lucerne 13	3	Radical Left	3	Anton Wapf; Anton Hunkeler; Hans Theiler
Uri 14	1	Catholic Right	1	Josef Arnold
Schwyz 15	2	Catholic Right	1	Karl Styger
Schwyz 15	2	Liberal Centre	1	Josef Anton Eberle
Obwalden 16	1	Catholic Right	1	Simon Ettlin
Nidwalden 17	1	Catholic Right	1	Alois Wyrsch
Glarus 18	2	Liberal Centre	1	Joachim Heer
Glarus 18	2	Radical Left	1	Peter Jenny II
Zug 19	1	Liberal Centre	1	Wolfgang Henggeler
Fribourg 20	3	Catholic Right	3	Louis de Weck; Laurent Chaney; Alfred Vonderweid
Fribourg 21	2	Catholic Right	2	Pierre-Théodule Fracheboud; Louis de Wuilleret
Solothurn 22	3	Radical Left	2	Simon Kaiser; Benedikt von Arx
Solothurn 22	3	Catholic Right	1	Franz Bünzli
Basel-Stadt 23	2	Liberal Centre	1	Johann Jakob Stehlin
Basel-Stadt 23	2	Radical Left	1	Wilhelm Klein
Basel-Landschaft 24	3	Radical Left	2	Jakob Joseph Adam; Stephan Gutzwiller
Basel-Landschaft 24	3	Liberal Centre	1	Johann Jakob Baader
Schaffhausen 25	2	Liberal Centre	1	Friedrich Peyer im Hof
Schaffhausen 25	2	Democratic Left	1	Wilhelm Joos
Appenzell Ausserrhoden 26	2	Liberal Centre	1	Adolf Friedrich Zürcher
Appenzell Ausserrhoden 26	2	Radical Left	1	Johann Ulrich Meyer
Appenzell Innerhoden 27	1	Catholic Right	1	Alois Broger
St. Gallen 28	3	Liberal Centre	1	Johann Baptist Weder
St. Gallen 28	3	Catholic Right	1	Johannes Zündt
St. Gallen 28	3	Democratic Left	1	Friedrich Bernet
St. Gallen 29	3	Democratic Left	2	Gallus August Suter; Johann Baptist Gaudy
St. Gallen 29	3	Liberal Centre	1	Josef Leonhard Bernold
St. Gallen 30	3	Radical Left	1	Carl Georg Jakob Sailer; Johann M. Hungerbühler
St. Gallen 30	3	Democratic Left	1	Georg Friedrich Anderegg
Grisons 31	2	Radical Left	1	Johann Gaudenz von Salis
Grisons 31	2	Liberal Centre	1	Simeon Bavier
Grisons 32	2	Catholic Right	1	Johann R. von Toggenburg
Grisons 32	2	Radical Left	1	Alois de Latour
Grisons 33	1	Liberal Centre	1	Andreas Rudolf von Planta
Aargau 34	3	Liberal Centre	3	Friedrich Frey-Herosé; Carl Feer-Herzog; Adolf Fischer
Aargau 35	4	Liberal Centre	3	Samuel Schwarz; Theodor Bertschinger; Alois Isler
Aargau 35	4	Radical Left	1	Peter Suter
Aargau 36	3	Radical Left	2	Friedrich Joseph Bürli; Augustin Keller
Aargau 36	3	Liberal Centre	1	Fridolin Schneider
Thurgau 37	5	Democratic Left	2	Philipp Gottlieb Labhardt; Fridolin Anderwert
Thurgau 37	5	Radical Left	1	Johann Ludwig Sulzberger
Thurgau 37	5	Liberal Centre	1	Johann Messmer
Thurgau 37	5	Catholic Right	1	Augustin Ramsperger
Ticino 38	3	Radical Left	2	Costantino Bernasconi; Carlo Battaglini
Ticino 38	3	Catholic Right	1	Giovanni Polar
Ticino 39	3	Catholic Right	1	Michele Pedrazzini
Ticino 39	3	Liberal Centre	1	Luigi Rusca
Ticino 39	3	Radical Left	1	Giovanni Jauch
Vaud 40	4	Radical Left	2	Victor Ruffy; Louis Ruchonnet
Vaud 40	4	Liberal Centre	2	Charles Cossy; Paul Cérésole
Vaud 41	4	Radical Left	2	Constant Fornerod; Abram-Daniel Meystre
Vaud 41	4	Liberal Centre	2	Jean-Louis Demiéville; Charles Bontems
Vaud 42	3	Radical Left	3	Louis-Henri Delarageaz; Charles Baud; Henri Reymond
Valais 43	2	Catholic Right	2	Alexis Allet; Hans Anton von Roten
Valais 44	1	Catholic Right	1	Maurice Evéquoz
Valais 45	2	Radical Left	2	Louis Barman; Maurice-Antoine Cretton
Neuchâtel 46	4	Radical Left	4	Alexis-Marie Piaget; Jules Philippin; Henri Grandjean; Ami Girard
Geneva 47	4	Liberal Centre	4	Philippe Camperio; François-Jules Pictet; Charles Friderich; Albert Wessel
Source: Gruner

=== Council of States ===
Party	Seats	+/–
Catholic Right	14	–3
Liberal Centre	13	0
Radical Left	12	+3
Democratic Left	1	+1
Evangelical Right	0	0
Independents	2	–2
Vacant	2	+2
Total	44	0
Source: Federal Assembly
