= 1869 Swiss federal election =

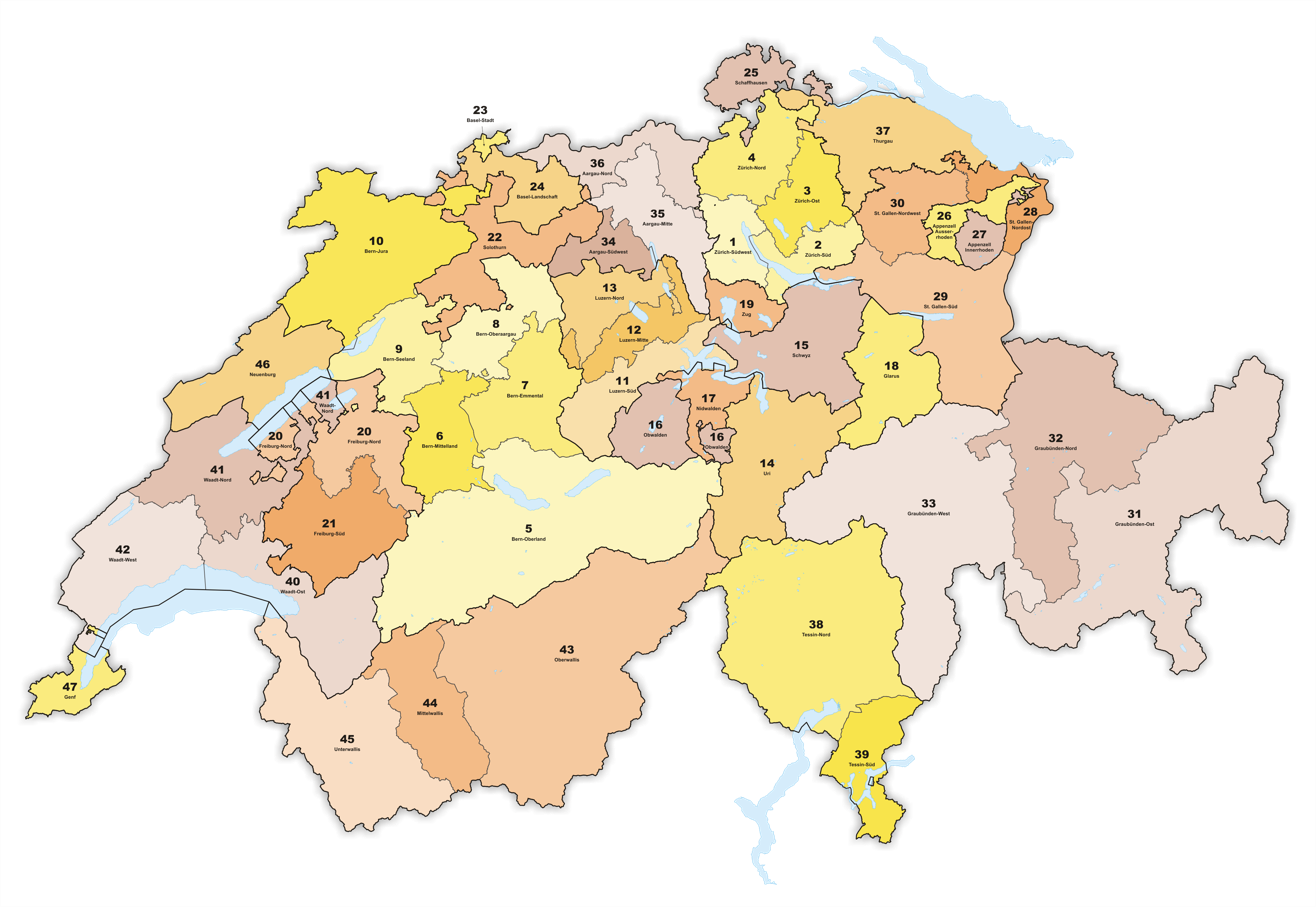
The 47 electoral districts

Federal elections were held in Switzerland on 31 October 1869. The Radical Left remained the largest group in the National Council.

== Electoral system ==
The 128 members of the National Council were elected in 47 single- and multi-member constituencies; there was one seat for every 20,000 citizens, with seats allocated to cantons in proportion to their population. The elections were held using a three-round system; candidates had to receive a majority in the first or second round to be elected; if it went to a third round, only a plurality was required. Voters could cast as many votes as there were seats in their constituency. In six cantons (Appenzell Innerrhoden, Appenzell Ausserrhoden, Glarus, Nidwalden, Obwalden and Uri), National Council members were elected by the Landsgemeinde.

== Results ==
=== National Council ===
Voter turnout was highest in Aargau at 85.6% (higher than the 79.1% who voted in Schaffhausen, where voting was compulsory) and lowest in Schwyz and Zug at 22.1%.

Graph of the party split among 128 seats.
Party	First round			Second round			Third round			Total seats
Party	Votes	%	Seats	Votes	%	Seats	Votes	%	Seats	Total seats
Radical Left	319,998	37.46	50	39,631	28.55	3	17,932	59.95	2	55
Liberal Centre	253,951	29.73	29	29,224	21.05	1	3,433	11.48	1	31
Democratic Left	129,260	15.13	8	50,054	36.05	6				14
Catholic Right	120,248	14.08	22	13,987	10.07	1	8,547	28.57	1	24
Evangelical Right	24,582	2.88	3	5,940	4.28	0				3
Radical Left dissidents	6,122	0.72	1							1
Total	854,161	100.00	113	138,836	100.00	11	29,912	100.00	4	128
Source: BFS

==== By constituency ====
Constituency	Seats	Party	Seats won	Elected members
Zürich 1	4	Liberal Centre	4	Jakob Dubs; Alfred Escher; Eduard Suter; Johann Jakob Widmer
Zürich 2	3	Democratic Left	2	Johann Jakob Keller; Walter Hauser
Zürich 2	3	Liberal Centre	1	Johann Heinrich Fierz
Zürich 3	3	Democratic Left	3	Hans Rudolf Zangger; Johann Jakob Spörri; Salomon Bleuler
Zürich 4	3	Democratic Left	3	Friedrich Scheuchzer; Jakob Fehr; Johann Jakob Scherer
Bern 5	4	Radical Left	4	Carl Samuel Zyro; Friedrich Seiler; Johann Jakob Karlen; Jakob Scherz
Bern 6	4	Evangelical Right	3	Otto von Büren; Samuel Steiner; August von Gonzenbach
Bern 6	4	Radical Left	1	Rudolf Brunner
Bern 7	4	Radical Left	4	Karl Schenk; Samuel Lehmann; Ludwig Wyss; Karl Karrer
Bern 8	4	Radical Left	3	Andreas Schmid; Johann Bützberger; Jakob Leuenberger
Bern 8	4	Liberal Centre	1	Daniel Flückiger
Bern 9	3	Radical Left	3	Eduard Marti; Jakob Stämpfli; Friedrich Eggli
Bern 10	4	Radical Left	4	Édouard Carlin; Paul Migy; Niklaus Kaiser; Pierre Jolissaint
Lucerne 11	2	Liberal Centre	1	Josef Martin Knüsel
Lucerne 11	2	Radical Left	1	Josef Bucher
Lucerne 12	2	Catholic Right	2	Philipp Anton von Segesser; Vinzenz Fischer
Lucerne 13	3	Catholic Right	3	Franz Xaver Beck; Jost Peyer; Adam Herzog
Uri 14	1	Catholic Right	1	Josef Arnold
Schwyz 15	2	Liberal Centre	1	Josef Anton Eberle
Schwyz 15	2	Catholic Right	1	Karl Styger
Obwalden 16	1	Catholic Right	1	Simon Ettlin
Nidwalden 17	1	Catholic Right	1	Alois Wyrsch
Glarus 18	2	Liberal Centre	1	Joachim Heer
Glarus 18	2	Radical Left	1	Peter Jenny II
Zug 19	1	Radical Left	1	Karl Josef Merz
Fribourg 20	3	Catholic Right	3	Louis de Weck; Alfred Vonderweid; Laurent Chaney
Fribourg 21	2	Catholic Right	2	Pierre-Théodule Fracheboud; Louis de Wuilleret
Solothurn 22	3	Radical Left	2	Benedikt von Arx; Simon Kaiser
Solothurn 22	3	Catholic Right	1	Franz Bünzli
Basel-Stadt 23	2	Liberal Centre	1	Johann Jakob Stehlin
Basel-Stadt 23	2	Radical Left	1	Wilhelm Klein
Basel-Landschaft 24	3	Radical Left	2	Emanuel Löw; Stephan Gutzwiller
Basel-Landschaft 24	3	Liberal Centre	1	Martin Bider
Schaffhausen 25	2	Democratic Left	1	Wilhelm Joos
Schaffhausen 25	2	Liberal Centre	1	Friedrich Peyer im Hof
Appenzell Ausserrhoden 26	2	Liberal Centre	1	Adolf Friedrich Zürcher
Appenzell Ausserrhoden 26	2	Radical Left	1	Johannes Hohl
Appenzell Innerhoden 27	1	Catholic Right	1	Alois Broger
St. Gallen 28	3	Liberal Centre	2	Johann Baptist Weder; Daniel Wirth-Sand
St. Gallen 28	3	Catholic Right	1	Johannes Zündt
St. Gallen 29	3	Radical Left	2	Josef Leonhard Bernold; Johann Baptist Gaudy
St. Gallen 29	3	Liberal Centre	1	Johann Ulrich Ambühl
St. Gallen 30	3	Liberal Centre	2	Carl Georg Jakob Sailer; Georg Friedrich Anderegg
St. Gallen 30	3	Radical Left	1	Johann M. Hungerbühler
Grisons 31	2	Liberal Centre	1	Simeon Bavier
Grisons 31	2	Radical Left	1	Gaudenz Gadmer
Grisons 32	2	Catholic Right	1	Johann R. von Toggenburg
Grisons 32	2	Radical Left	1	Johann Bartholome Caflisch
Grisons 33	1	Radical Left	1	Johann Albert Romedi
Aargau 34	3	Liberal Centre	2	Friedrich Frey-Herosé; Carl Feer-Herzog
Aargau 34	3	Radical Left	1	Arnold Künzli
Aargau 35	4	Liberal Centre	3	Peter Suter; Alois Isler; Theodor Bertschinger
Aargau 35	4	Democratic Left	1	Rudolf Urech
Aargau 36	3	Catholic Right	2	Karl von Schmid; Arnold Münch
Aargau 36	3	Liberal Centre	1	Fridolin Schneider
Thurgau 37	5	Democratic Left	4	Fridolin Anderwert; Jakob Albert Scherb; Friedrich Heinrich Häberlin; Adolf Deucher
Thurgau 37	5	Liberal Centre	1	Johann Messmer
Ticino 38	3	Radical Left	3	Giuseppe Soldini; Costantino Bernasconi; Carlo Battaglini
Ticino 39	3	Catholic Right	1	Michele Pedrazzini
Ticino 39	3	Radical Left	1	Giovanni Jauch
Ticino 39	3	Liberal Centre	1	Luigi Rusca
Vaud 40	4	Radical Left	2	Victor Ruffy; Louis Ruchonnet
Vaud 40	4	Liberal Centre	2	Charles Cossy; Paul Cérésole
Vaud 41	4	Radical Left	3	Abram-Daniel Meystre; Victor Perrin; Georges-Louis Contesse
Vaud 41	4	Liberal Centre	1	Jean-Louis Demiéville
Vaud 42	3	Radical Left	3	Louis-Henri Delarageaz; Charles Baud; Henri Reymond
Valais 43	2	Catholic Right	2	Alexis Allet; Hans Anton von Roten
Valais 44	1	Catholic Right	1	Maurice Evéquoz
Valais 45	2	Radical Left	2	Louis Barman; Maurice-Antoine Cretton
Neuchâtel 46	4	Radical Left	3	Jules Philippin; Édouard Desor; Zélim Perret
Neuchâtel 46	4	Radical Left dissidents	1	Louis Constant Lambelet
Geneva 47	4	Radical Left	3	Jean-Jacques Challet-Venel; Moïse Vautier; Antoine Carteret
Geneva 47	4	Liberal Centre	1	François-Jules Pictet
Source: Gruner

=== Council of States ===
Party	Seats	+/–
Catholic Right	14	0
Liberal Centre	12	–1
Radical Left	11	–1
Democratic Left	4	+3
Evangelical Right	0	0
Independents	3	+1
Total	44	0
Source: Federal Assembly
