= Liberal Socialist Party (Switzerland) =

Former Swiss political party founded in 1946

The Liberal Socialist Party is a former Swiss political party founded in 1946 as a split from the Swiss free-market movement and later merged into the International Association for Natural Economic Order in 1990.

== History ==
The history of the Liberal Socialist Party is rooted in the Swiss free-market movement, which began in the 1910s. In 1914, Silvio Gesell, the founder of free-market economics, gave a public lecture in Bern at the invitation of Ernst Schneider, a Damascus scholar, reform pedagogue and seminary director. On July 4, 1915, the association Freiland und Freigeld - Schweizerischer Bund zur Schaffung des Rechtes auf den vollen Arbeitsertrag durch Bodenbesitz- und Geldreform (Free Land and Free Money - Swiss Federation for the Creation of the Right to the Full Yield of Labour through Land Ownership and Monetary Reform) was formed, which was later renamed the Schweizerischer Freiwirtschaftsbund (SFB) in the spring of 1924. The leading figures of the association were the doctor and physicist Theophil Christen and the life reformer and writer Werner Zimmermann. From 1917, the association published its own journal under the editorial direction of Fritz Schwarz, the titles of which were initially Die Freistatt - Zeitschrift für Kultur und Schulpolitik (until 1921), then Der Freigeldler (until 1922) and Das Freigeld: Zeitschrift des Schweizer Freiland-Freigeld-Bundes and finally, from 1923 to 1940, Die Freiwirtschaftliche Zeitung. In the 1939 Swiss parliamentary elections, the FWB succeeded in winning a seat in the National Council in Basel-Landschaft with Hans Konrad Sonderegger, and also held one to three seats in the cantonal parliaments of some German-speaking Swiss cantons.
