= Party of Farmers, Traders and Independents =

Party of Farmers, Traders and Independents German: Bauern-, Gewerbe- und Bürgerpartei French: Parti des paysans, artisans et indépendants Italian: Partito dei Contadini, Commercianti e Indipendenti
- Leaders: Rudolf Minger (first); Rudolf Gnägi (last)
- Founded: 1917
- Dissolved: 1971; 54 years ago
- Merged into: Swiss People's Party
- Headquarters: Bern, Switzerland
- Ideology: National conservatism; Agrarianism; Protectionism
- Political position: Right-wing
- Colours: Green

The Party of Farmers, Traders and Independents (French: Parti des paysans, artisans et indépendants) or Farmers', Traders' and Citizens' Party (German: Bauern-, Gewerbe- und Bürgerpartei, BGB) was a Swiss political party founded in 1936. It grew out of a merger between various farmers’ parties at canton level which had been established during the First World War (Zurich 1917 and Bern 1918).

In November 1917, Rudolf Minger set up the Bern Party of Farmers and Independents (Bernischen Bauern- und Bürgerpartei, BGB) following a meeting held at an assembly hall in Bern known as the Bierhübeli his party was first represented in the Federal Council of the cantonal government from 1929 to 1940. Like Minger himself, all the party's other Federal Councillors came from the canton of Bern: Eduard von Steiger (1941–51), Markus Feldmann (1952–58), Friedrich Traugott Wahlen (1959–65) and Rudolf Gnägi (1966–79). However, Bern was not the only canton in which the party was represented: it also existed in the cantons of Aargau, Baselland, Freiburg, Schaffhausen, Tessin, Thurgau, Waadt and Zürich.

In 1971, the Party of Farmers, Traders and Independents combined with the Democratic Party of the cantons of Glarus and Graubünden to form the Swiss People's Party. The SVP inherited the BGB's seat on the Federal Council.

== See also ==
- Agriculture in Switzerland
