= List of members of the Federal Assembly from the Canton of Fribourg =

Coat of Arms

This is a list of members of both houses of the Federal Assembly from the Canton of Fribourg.

== Members of the Council of States ==
| Councillor (Party) | Election | Councillor (Party) |
|---|---|---|
| André Castella; Free Democratic Party; 1848–1850 | Appointed | Jean-J. Page; Free Democratic Party; 1848–1851 |
| Julien de Schaller; Free Democratic Party; 1850–1851 | Appointed | Jean-J. Page; Free Democratic Party; 1848–1851 |
| Karl-Fr. Chatoney; Free Democratic Party; 1851–1853 | Appointed | Pierre-A. Comte; Free Democratic Party; 1851–1854 |
| Jean N.-E. Berchtold; Free Democratic Party; 1853–1854 | Appointed | Pierre-A. Comte; Free Democratic Party; 1851–1854 |
| Julien de Schaller; Free Democratic Party; 1854–1858 | Appointed | Nicolas-L. Glasson; Free Democratic Party; 1854–1857 |
| Julien de Schaller; Free Democratic Party; 1854–1858 | Appointed | Pierre-Th. Fracheboud; Conservative; 1857–1863 |
| François-Romain Werro; Conservateurs modérés 1858–1860 | Appointed | Pierre-Th. Fracheboud; Conservative; 1857–1863 |
| Frédéric-J. Gendre; Conservative; 1860–1868 | Appointed | |
| Frédéric-J. Gendre; Conservative; 1860–1868 | Appointed | Louis de Weck; Conservative; 1863–1866 |
| Frédéric-J. Gendre; Conservative; 1860–1868 | Appointed | F. Xavier Bondallaz; Conservative; 1866–1870 |
| Joseph Jaquet; Conservative; 1868–1872 | Appointed | F. Xavier Bondallaz; Conservative; 1866–1870 |
| Joseph Jaquet; Conservative; 1868–1872 | Appointed | Henri Gaspard de Schaller; Conservative; 1870–1896 |
| Fr.-Xavier Menoud; Conservative; 1872–1883 | Appointed | Henri Gaspard de Schaller; Conservative; 1870–1896 |
| Alphonse Theraulaz; Conservative; 1883–1884 | Appointed | Henri Gaspard de Schaller; Conservative; 1870–1896 |
| Alois Bossy; Conservative; 1884–1898 | Appointed | Henri Gaspard de Schaller; Conservative; 1870–1896 |
| Alois Bossy; Conservative; 1884–1898 | Appointed | Georges Python; Conservative; 1896–1920 |
| Louis Cardinaux; Conservative; 1898–1914 | Appointed | Georges Python; Conservative; 1896–1920 |
| Ernest de Weck; Conservative; 1914–1915 | Appointed | Georges Python; Conservative; 1896–1920 |
| Georges-Jean-Joseph de Montenach; Conservative; 1915–1925 | Appointed | Georges Python; Conservative; 1896–1920 |
| Georges-Jean-Joseph de Montenach; Conservative; 1915–1925 | Appointed | Emile Savoy; Conservative; 1920–1935 |
| Bernard Weck; Conservative; 1925–1950 | Appointed | Emile Savoy; Conservative; 1920–1935 |
| Bernard Weck; Conservative; 1925–1950 | Appointed | Joseph Piller; Conservative; 1935–1947 |
| Bernard Weck; Conservative; 1925–1950 | Appointed | Maxime Quartenoud; Conservative; 1947–1956 |
| Joseph Piller; Conservative; 1950–1954 | Appointed | Maxime Quartenoud; Conservative; 1947–1956 |
| Paul Torche; Conservative; 1954–1972 | Appointed | Maxime Quartenoud; Conservative; 1947–1956 |
| Paul Torche; Conservative; 1954–1972 | Appointed | Jean Bourgknecht; Conservative; 1956–1959 |
| Paul Torche; Conservative; 1954–1972 | Appointed | Alphons Roggo; Christian Social Conservative Party; 1960–1968 |
| Paul Torche; Conservative; 1954–1972 | Appointed | Gustave-Laurent Roulin; Christian Social Conservative Party; 1968–1972 |
| Jean-François de Bourgknecht; Christian Democratic People's Party; 1972–1979 | 1972 | Pierre Dreyer; Christian Democratic People's Party; 1972–1987 |
| Jean-François de Bourgknecht; Christian Democratic People's Party; 1972–1979 | 1975 | Pierre Dreyer; Christian Democratic People's Party; 1972–1987 |
| Otto Piller; Social Democratic Party; 1979–1995 | 1979 | Pierre Dreyer; Christian Democratic People's Party; 1972–1987 |
| Otto Piller; Social Democratic Party; 1979–1995 | 1983 | Pierre Dreyer; Christian Democratic People's Party; 1972–1987 |
| Otto Piller; Social Democratic Party; 1979–1995 | 1987 | Anton Cottier; Christian Democratic People's Party; 1987–2003 |
| Otto Piller; Social Democratic Party; 1979–1995 | 1991 | Anton Cottier; Christian Democratic People's Party; 1987–2003 |
| Pierre Aeby; Social Democratic Party; 1995–1999 | 1995 | Anton Cottier; Christian Democratic People's Party; 1987–2003 |
| Jean-Claude Cornu; Free Democratic Party; 1999–2003 | 1999 | Anton Cottier; Christian Democratic People's Party; 1987–2003 |
| Alain Berset; Social Democratic Party; 2003–2011 | 2003 | Urs Schwaller; Christian Democratic People's Party; 2003–2015 |
| Alain Berset; Social Democratic Party; 2003–2011 | 2007 | Urs Schwaller; Christian Democratic People's Party; 2003–2015 |
| Alain Berset; Social Democratic Party; 2003–2011 | 2011 | Urs Schwaller; Christian Democratic People's Party; 2003–2015 |
| Christian Levrat; Social Democratic Party; 2012–present | 2012 | Urs Schwaller; Christian Democratic People's Party; 2003–2015 |
| Christian Levrat; Social Democratic Party; 2012–present | 2015 | Beat Vonlanthen; Christian Democratic People's Party; 2015–present |
| Christian Levrat; Social Democratic Party; 2012–present | 2019 | Johanna Gapany; FDP.The Liberals; 2019–present |
| Issabelle Chassot; The Centre; 2023–present | 2023 | Johanna Gapany; FDP.The Liberals; 2019–present |

== Members of the National Council ==
| Election | Councillor (Party) | Councillor (Party) | Councillor (Party) | Councillor (Party) | | Councillor (Party) | Councillor (Party) | Councillor (Party) |
|---|---|---|---|---|---|---|---|---|
| 1848 | François-X. Badoud (FDP/PRD) | Jean Folly (FDP/PRD) | Nicolas-L. Glasson (FDP/PRD) | | Christophe J. Marro (FDP/PRD) | Jacques J. Remy (FDP/PRD) | 5 seats 1848–1863 | |
| 1851 | J.-F.-Marcelin Bussard (FDP/PRD) | Julien de Schaller (FDP/PRD) | Nicolas-L. Glasson (FDP/PRD) | | Léon Pittet (FDP/PRD) | Henri Benj. Presset (FDP/PRD) | 5 seats 1848–1863 | |
| 1853 | J.-F.-Marcelin Bussard (FDP/PRD) | Hubert Charles (Conservative) | Nicolas-L. Glasson (FDP/PRD) | | Léon Pittet (FDP/PRD) | Henri Benj. Presset (FDP/PRD) | 5 seats 1848–1863 | |
| 1854 | F. Xavier Bondallaz (Conservative) | Hubert Charles (Conservative) | Louis de Wuilleret (Conservative) | | Joh. Friedr. L. Engelhard (LibCons*) | Alfred von der Weid (Conservative) | 5 seats 1848–1863 | |
| 1857 | F. Xavier Bondallaz (Conservative) | Hubert Charles (Conservative) | Louis de Wuilleret (Conservative) | | Joh. Friedr. L. Engelhard (LibCons*) | Alfred von der Weid (Conservative) | 5 seats 1848–1863 | |
| 1860 | F. Xavier Bondallaz (Conservative) | Hubert Charles (Conservative) | Louis de Wuilleret (Conservative) | | Joh. Anton Engelhard (LibCons*) | Alfred von der Weid (Conservative) | 5 seats 1848–1863 | |
| 1863 | Fr. Laurent Chaney (Conservative) | Pierre-Th. Fracheboud (Conservative) | Louis de Wuilleret (Conservative) | | Joh. Anton Engelhard (LibCons*) | Alfred von der Weid (Conservative) | Samuel Presset (Conservative) | 6 seats 1863–1890 |
| 1866 | Fr. Laurent Chaney (Conservative) | Pierre-Th. Fracheboud (Conservative) | Louis de Wuilleret (Conservative) | | Joh. Anton Engelhard (LibCons*) | Alfred von der Weid (Conservative) | Louis de Weck (Conservative) | 6 seats 1863–1890 |
| 1869 | Fr. Laurent Chaney (Conservative) | Pierre-Th. Fracheboud (Conservative) | Louis de Wuilleret (Conservative) | | Joh. Anton Engelhard (LibCons*) | Alfred von der Weid (Conservative) | Louis de Weck (Conservative) | 6 seats 1863–1890 |
| 1872 | Fr. Laurent Chaney (Conservative) | Louis Grand (Conservative) | Louis de Wuilleret (Conservative) | | Karl Vissaula (FDP/PRD) | Joseph Jaquet (Conservative) | Louis de Weck (Conservative) | 6 seats 1863–1890 |
| 1875 | Fr. Laurent Chaney (Conservative) | Louis Grand (Conservative) | Louis de Wuilleret (Conservative) | | Ph.-A.-Arthur de Techtermann (Conservative) | Joseph Jaquet (Conservative) | Louis de Weck (Conservative) | 6 seats 1863–1890 |
| 1878 | Fr. Laurent Chaney (Conservative) | Louis Grand (Conservative) | Louis de Wuilleret (Conservative) | | Ph.-A.-Arthur de Techtermann (Conservative) | Joseph Jaquet (Conservative) | Louis de Weck (Conservative) | 6 seats 1863–1890 |
| 1881 | Fr. Laurent Chaney (Conservative) | Louis Grand (Conservative) | Louis de Wuilleret (Conservative) | | Ph.-A.-Arthur de Techtermann (Conservative) | Joseph Jaquet (Conservative) | Paul Aeby (Conservative) | 6 seats 1863–1890 |
| 1881 | Fr. Laurent Chaney (Conservative) | Louis Grand (Conservative) | Louis de Wuilleret (Conservative) | | Eduard D. Huber (FDP/PRD) | Joseph Jaquet (Conservative) | Louis-Auguste Marmier (FDP/PRD) | 6 seats 1863–1890 |
| 1883 | Paul Aeby (Conservative) | Louis Grand (Conservative) | Louis de Wuilleret (Conservative) | | Eduard D. Huber (FDP/PRD) | Joseph Jaquet (Conservative) | Louis-Auguste Marmier (FDP/PRD) | 6 seats 1863–1890 |
| '1884 | Paul Aeby (Conservative) | Louis Grand (Conservative) | Louis de Wuilleret (Conservative) | ' | Georges Cressier (Liberal) | Georges Python (Conservative) | Alphonse Theraulaz (Conservative) | 6 seats 1863–1890 |
| 1887 | Paul Aeby (Conservative) | Louis Grand (Conservative) | Louis de Wuilleret (Conservative) | ' | Georges Cressier (Liberal) | Georges Python (Conservative) | Alphonse Theraulaz (Conservative) | 6 seats 1863–1890 |
| 1889 | Friedrich A. Stock (FDP/PRD) | Louis Grand (Conservative) | Louis de Wuilleret (Conservative) | ' | Georges Cressier (Liberal) | Georges Python (Conservative) | Alphonse Theraulaz (Conservative) | 6 seats 1863–1890 |
| 1890 | Friedrich A. Stock (FDP/PRD) | Louis Grand (Conservative) | Louis de Wuilleret (Conservative) | 5 seats 1890–1898 | | Georges Python (Conservative) | Alphonse Theraulaz (Conservative) | 5 seats 1890–1898 |
| 1893 | Constant Dinichert (FDP/PRD) | Louis Grand (Conservative) | Louis de Wuilleret (Conservative) | 5 seats 1890–1898 | | Louis de Diesbach de Belleroche (CoLi->Cons) | Alphonse Theraulaz (Conservative) | 5 seats 1890–1898 |
| 1896 | Constant Dinichert (FDP/PRD) | Louis Grand (Conservative) | Louis de Wuilleret (Conservative) | 5 seats 1890–1898 | | Henri Gaspard de Schaller (Conservative) | Alphonse Theraulaz (Conservative) | 5 seats 1890–1898 |
| 1898 | Constant Dinichert (FDP/PRD) | Louis Grand (Conservative) | Alois Bossy (Conservative) | | Vincent Gottofrey (Conservative) | Henri Gaspard de Schaller (Conservative) | Alphonse Theraulaz (Conservative) | 6 seats 1898–1911 |
| 1899 | Constant Dinichert (FDP/PRD) | Louis Grand (Conservative) | Alois Bossy (Conservative) | | Vincent Gottofrey (Conservative) | Henri Gaspard de Schaller (Conservative) | Alphonse Theraulaz (Conservative) | 6 seats 1898–1911 |
| 1900 | Constant Dinichert (FDP/PRD) | Louis Grand (Conservative) | Alois Bossy (Conservative) | | Vincent Gottofrey (Conservative) | Louis de Diesbach de Belleroche (CoLi->Cons) | Alphonse Theraulaz (Conservative) | 6 seats 1898–1911 |
| 1902 | Constant Dinichert (FDP/PRD) | Eugène Grand (Conservative) | Alois Bossy (Conservative) | | Vincent Gottofrey (Conservative) | Louis de Diesbach de Belleroche (CoLi->Cons) | Alphonse Theraulaz (Conservative) | 6 seats 1898–1911 |
| 1905 | Constant Dinichert (FDP/PRD) | Eugène Grand (Conservative) | Alois Bossy (Conservative) | | Vincent Gottofrey (Conservative) | Louis de Diesbach de Belleroche (CoLi->Cons) | Alphonse Theraulaz (Conservative) | 6 seats 1898–1911 |
| 1907 | Constant Dinichert (FDP/PRD) | Eugène Grand (Conservative) | Max F. de Diesbach de Torny (Conservative) | | Charles de Wuilleret (Conservative) | Louis de Diesbach de Belleroche (CoLi->Cons) | Alphonse Theraulaz (Conservative) | 6 seats 1898–1911 |
| 1908 | Constant Dinichert (FDP/PRD) | Eugène Grand (Conservative) | Max F. de Diesbach de Torny (Conservative) | | Charles de Wuilleret (Conservative) | Louis de Diesbach de Belleroche (CoLi->Cons) | Alphonse Theraulaz (Conservative) | 6 seats 1898–1911 |
| 1911 | Alexandre-François-Louis Cailler (FDP/PRD) | Eugène Grand (Conservative) | Max F. de Diesbach de Torny (Conservative) | | Charles de Wuilleret (Conservative) | Eugène Deschenaux (Conservative) | Alphonse Theraulaz (Conservative) | Hermann Liechti (FDP/PRD) |
| 1914 | Alexandre-François-Louis Cailler (FDP/PRD) | Eugène Grand (Conservative) | Max F. de Diesbach de Torny (Conservative) | | Charles de Wuilleret (Conservative) | Eugène Deschenaux (Conservative) | Jean-Marie Musy (Conservative) | Hermann Liechti (FDP/PRD) |
| 1916 | Alexandre-François-Louis Cailler (FDP/PRD) | Eugène Grand (Conservative) | Franz Boschung (Conservative) | | Charles de Wuilleret (Conservative) | Eugène Deschenaux (Conservative) | Jean-Marie Musy (Conservative) | Hermann Liechti (FDP/PRD) |
| 1917 | Alexandre-François-Louis Cailler (FDP/PRD) | Eugène Grand (Conservative) | Franz Boschung (Conservative) | | Charles de Wuilleret (Conservative) | Eugène Deschenaux (Conservative) | Jean-Marie Musy (Conservative) | Hermann Liechti (FDP/PRD) |
| 1918 | Alexandre-François-Louis Cailler (FDP/PRD) | Eugène Grand (Conservative) | Franz Boschung (Conservative) | | Oscar Genoud (Conservative) | Eugène Deschenaux (Conservative) | Jean-Marie Musy (Conservative) | Hermann Liechti (FDP/PRD) |
| 1919 | Alexandre-François-Louis Cailler (FDP/PRD) | Eugène Grand (Conservative) | Franz Boschung (Conservative) | | Oscar Genoud (Conservative) | Ernest Perrier (Conservative) | Jean-Marie Musy (Conservative) | Fernand Torche (Conservative) |
| 1920 | Alexandre-François-Louis Cailler (FDP/PRD) | Eugène Grand (Conservative) | Franz Boschung (Conservative) | | Oscar Genoud (Conservative) | Ernest Perrier (Conservative) | Paul Morard (Conservative) | Fernand Torche (Conservative) |
| 1922 | Alexandre-François-Louis Cailler (FDP/PRD) | Eugène Grand (Conservative) | Franz Boschung (Conservative) | | Oscar Genoud (Conservative) | Ernest Perrier (Conservative) | Paul Morard (Conservative) | Jakob Gutknecht (FDP/PRD) |
| 1925 | Alexandre-François-Louis Cailler (FDP/PRD) | Eugène Grand (Conservative) | Franz Boschung (Conservative) | | Fernand Torche (Conservative) | Ernest Perrier (Conservative) | Paul Morard (Conservative) | Jakob Gutknecht (FDP/PRD) |
| 1926 | Alexandre-François-Louis Cailler (FDP/PRD) | Eugène Grand (Conservative) | Franz Boschung (Conservative) | | Fernand Torche (Conservative) | Ernest Perrier (Conservative) | Paul Morard (Conservative) | Emile Gross (FDP/PRD) |
| 1928 | Alexandre-François-Louis Cailler (FDP/PRD) | Peter Benninger (Conservative) | Franz Boschung (Conservative) | | Fernand Torche (Conservative) | Ernest Perrier (Conservative) | Paul Morard (Conservative) | Emile Gross (FDP/PRD) |
| 1930 | Alexandre-François-Louis Cailler (FDP/PRD) | Peter Benninger (Conservative) | Franz Boschung (Conservative) | | Fernand Torche (Conservative) | Ernest Perrier (Conservative) | Eugène Grand (Conservative) | Emile Gross (FDP/PRD) |
| 1931 | Alexandre-François-Louis Cailler (FDP/PRD) | Peter Benninger (Conservative) | Franz Boschung (Conservative) | | Pierre Aeby (Conservative) | Ernest Perrier (Conservative) | Eugène Grand (Conservative) | Joseph Delatena (Conservative) |
| 1932 | Alexandre-François-Louis Cailler (FDP/PRD) | Peter Benninger (Conservative) | Franz Boschung (Conservative) | | Pierre Aeby (Conservative) | Charles Chassot (Conservative) | Eugène Grand (Conservative) | Joseph Delatena (Conservative) |
| 1935 | James Glasson (FDP/PRD) | Peter Benninger (Conservative) | Samuel Gutknecht (FDP/PRD) | | Pierre Aeby (Conservative) | Franz Müller (Conservative) | Jean-Marie Musy (Conservative) | Maxime Quartenoud (Conservative) |
| 1937 | James Glasson (FDP/PRD) | Charles Chassot (Conservative) | Samuel Gutknecht (FDP/PRD) | | Pierre Aeby (Conservative) | Franz Müller (Conservative) | Jean-Marie Musy (Conservative) | Maxime Quartenoud (Conservative) |
| 1939 | James Glasson (FDP/PRD) | Charles Chassot (Conservative) | Samuel Gutknecht (FDP/PRD) | | Pierre Aeby (Conservative) | Franz Müller (Conservative) | Robert Colliard (PAB) | Maxime Quartenoud (Conservative) |
| 1943 | James Glasson (FDP/PRD) | Charles Chassot (Conservative) | Samuel Gutknecht (FDP/PRD) | | Pierre Aeby (Conservative) | Franz Müller (Conservative) | Laurent Ruffieux (PAB) | Maxime Quartenoud (Conservative) |
| 1943 | René Mauroux (SP/PS) | Albert Pasquier (Conservative) | Samuel Gutknecht (FDP/PRD) | | Pierre Aeby (Conservative) | Franz Müller (Conservative) | Eusèbe Philipona (Conservative) | Maxime Quartenoud (Conservative) |
| 1944 | René Mauroux (SP/PS) | Albert Pasquier (Conservative) | Samuel Gutknecht (FDP/PRD) | | Pierre Aeby (Conservative) | Jakob Meyer (Conservative) | Eusèbe Philipona (Conservative) | Maxime Quartenoud (Conservative) |
| 1947 | René Mauroux (SP/PS) | Albert Pasquier (Conservative) | Samuel Gutknecht (FDP/PRD) | | Pierre Aeby (Conservative) | Jakob Meyer (Conservative) | Eusèbe Philipona (Conservative) | Charles Chassot (Conservative) |
| 1947 | René Mauroux (SP/PS) | Albert Pasquier (Conservative) | Armand Droz (FDP/PRD) | | Joseph Ackermann (Conservative) | Pierre Glasson (FDP/PRD) | Eusèbe Philipona (Conservative) | Paul Torche (Conservative) |
| 1948 | René Mauroux (SP/PS) | Albert Pasquier (Conservative) | Armand Droz (FDP/PRD) | | Joseph Ackermann (Conservative) | Edmond Blanc (FDP/PRD) | Eusèbe Philipona (Conservative) | Paul Torche (Conservative) |
| 1949 | René Mauroux (SP/PS) | Albert Pasquier (Conservative) | Armand Droz (FDP/PRD) | | Joseph Ackermann (Conservative) | Edmond Blanc (FDP/PRD) | Fritz Herren (Conservative) | Paul Torche (Conservative) |
| 1951 | Charles Strebel (SP/PS) | Max Aebischer (Conservative) | Pierre Glasson (FDP/PRD) | | Jean Bourgknecht (Conservative) | Robert Colliard (PAB) | Fritz Herren (Conservative) | Paul Torche (Conservative) |
| 1954 | Charles Strebel (SP/PS) | Max Aebischer (Conservative) | Pierre Glasson (FDP/PRD) | | Jean Bourgknecht (Conservative) | Robert Colliard (PAB) | Fritz Herren (Conservative) | Henri Gendre (Conservative) |
| 1955 | Charles Strebel (SP/PS) | Max Aebischer (Conservative) | Pierre Glasson (FDP/PRD) | | Constant Overney (Conservative) | Robert Colliard (PAB) | Fritz Herren (Conservative) | Henri Gendre (Conservative) |
| 1959 | Charles Strebel (SP/PS) | Max Aebischer (Conservative) | Pierre Glasson (FDP/PRD) | | Constant Overney (Conservative) | Robert Colliard (PAB) | Fritz Herren (Conservative) | Franz Hayoz (CCS) |
| 1960 | Charles Strebel (SP/PS) | Max Aebischer (Conservative) | Pierre Glasson (FDP/PRD) | | Constant Overney (Conservative) | Gabriel Kolly (PAB) | Fritz Herren (Conservative) | Franz Hayoz (CCS) |
| 1963 | Charles Strebel (SP/PS) | Max Aebischer (Conservative) | Pierre Glasson (FDP/PRD) | | Louis Barras (CCS) | Paul Genoud (FDP/PRD) | 6 seats 1963–2003 | Franz Hayoz (CCS) |
| 1966 | Charles Strebel (SP/PS) | Max Aebischer (Conservative) | Pierre Glasson (FDP/PRD) | | Louis Barras (CCS) | Gérard Glasson (FDP/PRD) | 6 seats 1963–2003 | Franz Hayoz (CCS) |
| 1967 | Jean Riesen (SP/PS) | Max Aebischer (Conservative) | Pierre Glasson (FDP/PRD) | | Louis Barras (CCS) | Gérard Glasson (FDP/PRD) | 6 seats 1963–2003 | Franz Hayoz (CCS) |
| 1971 | Jean Riesen (SP/PS) | Laurent Butty (CVP/PDC) | Liselotte Spreng (FDP/PRD) | | Louis Barras (CCS) | Gérard Glasson (FDP/PRD) | 6 seats 1963–2003 | Franz Hayoz (CCS) |
| 1975 | Jean Riesen (SP/PS) | Laurent Butty (CVP/PDC) | Liselotte Spreng (FDP/PRD) | | Louis Barras (CCS) | Félicien Morel (SP/PS) | 6 seats 1963–2003 | Paul Zbinden (CVP/PDC) |
| 1979 | Jean Riesen (SP/PS) | Laurent Butty (CVP/PDC) | Liselotte Spreng (FDP/PRD) | | Louis Barras (CCS) | Félicien Morel (SP/PS) | 6 seats 1963–2003 | Paul Zbinden (CVP/PDC) |
| 1983 | Jean Riesen (SP/PS) | Laurent Butty (CVP/PDC) | Pierre Rime (FDP/PRD) | | Joseph Cottet (SVP/UDC) | Jean Savary (CVP/PDC) | 6 seats 1963–2003 | Paul Zbinden (CVP/PDC) |
| 1987 | Cyrill Brügger (SP/PS) | Elisabeth Déglise (CVP/PDC) | Jean-Nicolas Philipona (FDP/PRD) | | Bernard Rohrbasser (SVP/UDC) | Jean Savary (CVP/PDC) | 6 seats 1963–2003 | Paul Zbinden (CVP/PDC) |
| 1991 | Cyrill Brügger (SP/PS) | Joseph Deiss (CVP/PDC) | Jean-Nicolas Philipona (FDP/PRD) | | Bernard Rohrbasser (SVP/UDC) | Hugo Fasel (CSP/PCS) | 6 seats 1963–2003 | Alexis Gobet (CVP/PDC) |
| 1995 | Rose-Marie Ducrot (CVP/PDC) | Joseph Deiss (CVP/PDC) | Jean-Nicolas Philipona (FDP/PRD) | | Erwin Jutzet (SP/PS) | Hugo Fasel (CSP/PCS) | 6 seats 1963–2003 | Hubert Lauper (CVP/PDC) |
| 1999 | Thérèse Meyer-Kaelin (CVP/PDC) | Liliane Chappuis (SP/PS) | Jean-Paul Glasson (FDP/PRD) | | Erwin Jutzet (SP/PS) | Hugo Fasel (CSP/PCS) | 6 seats 1963–2003 | Hubert Lauper (CVP/PDC) |
| 2003 | Thérèse Meyer-Kaelin (CVP/PDC) | Christian Levrat (SP/PS) | Jean-Paul Glasson (FDP/PRD) | | Erwin Jutzet (SP/PS) | Hugo Fasel (CSP/PCS) | Jean-François Rime (SVP/UDC) | Dominique de Buman (CVP/PDC) |
| 2007 | Thérèse Meyer-Kaelin (CVP/PDC) | Christian Levrat (SP/PS) | Jacques Bourgeois (FDP/PRD) | | Liliane Chappuis (SP/PS) | Hugo Fasel (CSP/PCS) | Jean-François Rime (SVP/UDC) | Dominique de Buman (CVP/PDC) |
| 2008 | Thérèse Meyer-Kaelin (CVP/PDC) | Christian Levrat (SP/PS) | Jacques Bourgeois (FDP/PRD) | | Jean-François Steiert (SP/PS) | Marie-Thérèse Weber-Gobet (CSP/PCS) | Jean-François Rime (SVP/UDC) | Dominique de Buman (CVP/PDC) |
| 2011 | Christine Bulliard-Marbach (CVP/PDC / The Centre) | Christian Levrat (SP/PS) | Jacques Bourgeois (FDP/PRD) | | Jean-François Steiert (SP/PS) | Valérie Piller Carrard (SP/PS) | Jean-François Rime (SVP/UDC) | Dominique de Buman (CVP/PDC) |
| 2012 | Christine Bulliard-Marbach (CVP/PDC / The Centre) | Ursula Schneider Schüttel (SP/PS) | Jacques Bourgeois (FDP/PRD) | | Jean-François Steiert (SP/PS) | Valérie Piller Carrard (SP/PS) | Jean-François Rime (SVP/UDC) | Dominique de Buman (CVP/PDC) |
| 2015 | Christine Bulliard-Marbach (CVP/PDC / The Centre) | Pierre-André Page (SVP/UDC) | Jacques Bourgeois (FDP/PRD) | | Jean-François Steiert (SP/PS) | Valérie Piller Carrard (SP/PS) | Jean-François Rime (SVP/UDC) | Dominique de Buman (CVP/PDC) |
| 2017 | Christine Bulliard-Marbach (CVP/PDC / The Centre) | Pierre-André Page (SVP/UDC) | Jacques Bourgeois (FDP/PRD) | | Ursula Schneider Schüttel (SP/PS) | Valérie Piller Carrard (SP/PS) | Jean-François Rime (SVP/UDC) | Dominique de Buman (CVP/PDC) |
| 2019 | Christine Bulliard-Marbach (CVP/PDC / The Centre) | Pierre-André Page (SVP/UDC) | Jacques Bourgeois (FDP/PRD) | | Gerhard Andrey (GP/PV) | Valérie Piller Carrard (SP/PS) | Jean-François Rime (SVP/UDC) | Marie-France Roth Pasquier (CVP/PDC / The Centre) |
| 2023 | Christine Bulliard-Marbach (CVP/PDC / The Centre) | Pierre-André Page (SVP/UDC) | Nadine Gobet (FDP/PRD) | | Gerhard Andrey (GP/PV) | Valérie Piller Carrard (SP/PS) | Nicolas Kolly (SVP/UDC) | Marie-France Roth Pasquier (CVP/PDC / The Centre) |
