= List of members of the Federal Assembly from the Canton of Zug =

Coat of Arms

This is a list of members of both houses of the Federal Assembly from the Canton of Zug.

== Members of the Council of States ==
Councillor (Party)	Election	Councillor (Party)
Ferdinand Kaiser; Liberal Party; 1848–1850	Appointed	Gustav Adolf Keiser; Liberal Party; 1848–1854
Johann Uhr; Conservative; 1850–1850	Appointed	Gustav Adolf Keiser; Liberal Party; 1848–1854
Martin-Anton Keiser; Conservative; 1850–1854	Appointed	Gustav Adolf Keiser; Liberal Party; 1848–1854
Josef Leonz sen. Schmid; Conservative; 1854–1856	Appointed	Alois Schwerzmann; Conservative; 1854–1858
Georg Bossard; Conservative; 1856–1858	Appointed	Alois Schwerzmann; Conservative; 1854–1858
Karl Anton Landtwing; Liberal Party; 1858–1871	Appointed	
Karl Anton Landtwing; Liberal Party; 1858–1871	Appointed	Kaspar-Anton Keiser; Conservative; 1862–1865
Karl Anton Landtwing; Liberal Party; 1858–1871	Appointed	Oswald Dossenbach; Conservative; 1865–1877
Jakob Hildebrand; Conservative; 1871–1883	Appointed	Oswald Dossenbach; Conservative; 1865–1877
Jakob Hildebrand; Conservative; 1871–1883	Appointed	Josef Anton Hess; Conservative; 1877–1883
Josef Leonz jun. Schmid; Conservative; 1883–1886	Appointed	Josef Anton Hess; Conservative; 1877–1883
Josef Leonz jun. Schmid; Conservative; 1883–1886	Appointed	Georg J. J. F. Keiser; Conservative; 1885–1899
Josef Hildebrand; Conservative; 1886–1934	Appointed	Georg J. J. F. Keiser; Conservative; 1885–1899
Josef Hildebrand; Conservative; 1886–1934	Appointed	Philipp Meyer; Conservative; 1899–1909
Josef Hildebrand; Conservative; 1886–1934	Appointed	Josef Leonz jun. Schmid; Conservative; 1909–1913
Josef Hildebrand; Conservative; 1886–1934	Appointed	Josef Andermatt; Conservative; 1913–1930
Josef Hildebrand; Conservative; 1886–1934	Appointed	Philipp Etter; Conservative; 1930–1934
Alois Müller; Conservative; 1934–1941	Appointed	Philipp Etter; Conservative; 1930–1934
Alois Müller; Conservative; 1934–1941	Appointed	Alphons Iten; Conservative; 1935–1950
Augustin Lusser; Conservative; 1941–1970		Alphons Iten; Conservative; 1935–1950
Augustin Lusser; Conservative; 1941–1970	1943	Alphons Iten; Conservative; 1935–1950
Augustin Lusser; Conservative; 1941–1970	1947	Alphons Iten; Conservative; 1935–1950
Augustin Lusser; Conservative; 1941–1970	1951	Alois Zehnder; Conservative; 1951–1966
Augustin Lusser; Conservative; 1941–1970	1955	Alois Zehnder; Conservative; 1951–1966
Augustin Lusser; Conservative; 1941–1970	1959	Alois Zehnder; Conservative; 1951–1966
Augustin Lusser; Conservative; 1941–1970	1963	Alois Zehnder; Conservative; 1951–1966
Augustin Lusser; Conservative; 1941–1970	1967	Hans Hürlimann; Christian Social Conservative Party; 1967–1973
Othmar Andermatt; Free Democratic Party; 1971–1986	1971	Hans Hürlimann; Christian Social Conservative Party; 1967–1973
Othmar Andermatt; Free Democratic Party; 1971–1986	1974	Markus Kündig; Christian Democratic People's Party; 1974–1994
Othmar Andermatt; Free Democratic Party; 1971–1986	1975	Markus Kündig; Christian Democratic People's Party; 1974–1994
Othmar Andermatt; Free Democratic Party; 1971–1986	1979	Markus Kündig; Christian Democratic People's Party; 1974–1994
Othmar Andermatt; Free Democratic Party; 1971–1986	1983	Markus Kündig; Christian Democratic People's Party; 1974–1994
Andreas Iten; Free Democratic Party; 1987–1998	1987	Markus Kündig; Christian Democratic People's Party; 1974–1994
Andreas Iten; Free Democratic Party; 1987–1998	1991	Markus Kündig; Christian Democratic People's Party; 1974–1994
Andreas Iten; Free Democratic Party; 1987–1998	1995	Peter Bieri; Christian Democratic People's Party; 1995–2015
Rolf Schweiger; Free Democratic Party; 1999–2009; FDP.The Liberals; 2009–2011	1999	Peter Bieri; Christian Democratic People's Party; 1995–2015
Rolf Schweiger; Free Democratic Party; 1999–2009; FDP.The Liberals; 2009–2011	2003	Peter Bieri; Christian Democratic People's Party; 1995–2015
Rolf Schweiger; Free Democratic Party; 1999–2009; FDP.The Liberals; 2009–2011	2007	Peter Bieri; Christian Democratic People's Party; 1995–2015
Rolf Schweiger; Free Democratic Party; 1999–2009; FDP.The Liberals; 2009–2011	2009	Peter Bieri; Christian Democratic People's Party; 1995–2015
Joachim Eder; FDP.The Liberals; 2011–2019	2011	Peter Bieri; Christian Democratic People's Party; 1995–2015
Joachim Eder; FDP.The Liberals; 2011–2019	2015	Peter Hegglin; Christian Democratic People's Party; 2015–2023; The Centre; 2023–present
Matthias Michel; FDP.The Liberals; 2019–present	2019	Peter Hegglin; Christian Democratic People's Party; 2015–2023; The Centre; 2023–present
Matthias Michel; FDP.The Liberals; 2019–present	2023	Peter Hegglin; Christian Democratic People's Party; 2015–2023; The Centre; 2023–present

== Members of the National Council ==
Election	Councillor (Party)	Councillor (Party)	Councillor (Party)
1848	Silvan O. Schwerzmann (Conservative)	1 seat 1848–1922	
1851	Silvan O. Schwerzmann (Conservative)	1 seat 1848–1922	
1853	Johann Konrad Bossard (Conservative)	1 seat 1848–1922	
1854	Johann Konrad Bossard (Conservative)	1 seat 1848–1922	
1857	Johann Konrad Bossard (Conservative)	1 seat 1848–1922	
1860	Wolfgang Henggeler (Liberal)	1 seat 1848–1922	
1863	Wolfgang Henggeler (Liberal)	1 seat 1848–1922	
1866	Wolfgang Henggeler (Liberal)	1 seat 1848–1922	
1867	Karl Josef Leonhard Merz (Liberal)	1 seat 1848–1922	
1869	Karl Josef Leonhard Merz (Liberal)	1 seat 1848–1922	
1872	Alois Schwerzmann (Conservative)	1 seat 1848–1922	
1875	Alois Schwerzmann (Conservative)	1 seat 1848–1922	
1878	Niklaus Moos (Conservative)	1 seat 1848–1922	
1881	Niklaus Moos (Conservative)	1 seat 1848–1922	
1884	Theodor Keiser (Conservative)	1 seat 1848–1922	
1887	Alois Müller (Conservative)	1 seat 1848–1922	
1889	Franz Hediger (Conservative)	1 seat 1848–1922	
1890	Franz Hediger (Conservative)	1 seat 1848–1922	
1893	Franz Hediger (Conservative)	1 seat 1848–1922	
1896	Klemens Iten (FDP/PRD)	1 seat 1848–1922	
1899	Klemens Iten (FDP/PRD)	1 seat 1848–1922	
1902	Klemens Iten (FDP/PRD)	1 seat 1848–1922	
1905	Klemens Iten (FDP/PRD)	1 seat 1848–1922	
1908	Klemens Iten (FDP/PRD)	1 seat 1848–1922	
1911	Hermann Stadlin (FDP/PRD)	1 seat 1848–1922	
1914	Hermann Stadlin (FDP/PRD)	1 seat 1848–1922	
1917	Hermann Stadlin (FDP/PRD)	1 seat 1848–1922	
1919	Hermann Stadlin (FDP/PRD)	1 seat 1848–1922	
1921	Robert Naville (FDP/PRD)	1 seat 1848–1922	
1922	Albert Meyer (FDP/PRD)	Josef-Plazid Steiner (Conservative)	2 seats 1922–1995
1925	Albert Meyer (FDP/PRD)	Josef-Plazid Steiner (Conservative)	2 seats 1922–1995
1928	Albert Meyer (FDP/PRD)	Josef-Plazid Steiner (Conservative)	2 seats 1922–1995
1931	Albert Meyer (FDP/PRD)	Josef Stutz (Conservative)	2 seats 1922–1995
1935	Albert Meyer (FDP/PRD)	Josef Stutz (Conservative)	2 seats 1922–1995
1939	Albert Meyer (FDP/PRD)	Josef Stutz (Conservative)	2 seats 1922–1995
1943	Fritz Jost (SP/PS)	Josef Stutz (Conservative)	2 seats 1922–1995
1947	Manfred Stadlin (FDP/PRD)	Konrad Hess (Conservative)	2 seats 1922–1995
1951	Manfred Stadlin (FDP/PRD)	Konrad Hess (Conservative)	2 seats 1922–1995
1955	Manfred Stadlin (FDP/PRD)	Konrad Hess (Conservative)	2 seats 1922–1995
1959	Manfred Stadlin (FDP/PRD)	Konrad Hess (Conservative)	2 seats 1922–1995
1963	Manfred Stadlin (FDP/PRD)	Alois Hürlimann (CCS)	2 seats 1922–1995
1967	Andreas C. Brunner (FDP/PRD)	Alois Hürlimann (CCS)	2 seats 1922–1995
1971	Andreas C. Brunner (FDP/PRD)	Alois Hürlimann (CCS)	2 seats 1922–1995
1975	Thomas Fraefel (SP/PS)	Alois Hürlimann (CCS)	2 seats 1922–1995
1979	Anton Scherer (CVP/PDC)	Georg Stucky (FDP/PRD)	2 seats 1922–1995
1983	Peter Hess (CVP/PDC)	Georg Stucky (FDP/PRD)	2 seats 1922–1995
1987	Peter Hess (CVP/PDC)	Georg Stucky (FDP/PRD)	2 seats 1922–1995
1991	Peter Hess (CVP/PDC)	Georg Stucky (FDP/PRD)	2 seats 1922–1995
1995	Peter Hess (CVP/PDC)	Georg Stucky (FDP/PRD)	Armin Jans (SP/PS)
1999	Peter Hess (CVP/PDC)	Hansjakob Leutenegger (FDP/PRD)	Marcel Scherer (SVP/UDC)
2003	Gerhard Pfister (CVP/PDC / The Centre)	Josef Lang (Alliance of Independents)	Marcel Scherer (SVP/UDC)
2007	Gerhard Pfister (CVP/PDC / The Centre)	Josef Lang (Alliance of Independents)	Marcel Scherer (SVP/UDC)
2011	Gerhard Pfister (CVP/PDC / The Centre)	Bruno Pezzatti (FDP/PLR)	Thomas Aeschi (SVP/UDC)
2015	Gerhard Pfister (CVP/PDC / The Centre)	Bruno Pezzatti (FDP/PLR)	Thomas Aeschi (SVP/UDC)
2019	Gerhard Pfister (CVP/PDC / The Centre)	Manuela Weichelt-Picard (GP/PV)	Thomas Aeschi (SVP/UDC)
2023	Gerhard Pfister (CVP/PDC / The Centre)	Manuela Weichelt-Picard (GP/PV)	Thomas Aeschi (SVP/UDC)
