= List of members of the Federal Assembly from the Canton of Basel-Landschaft =

Coat of Arms

This is a list of members of both houses of the Federal Assembly from the Canton of Basel-Landschaft. As one of the cantons defined until 1999 as "half-cantons", Basel-Landschaft elects only one member to the Council of States

== Members of the Council of States ==
Election	Councillor (Party)
Appointed	Stephan Gutzwiller; Free Democratic Party; 1848–1851
Appointed	Eugen Madeux; Free Democratic Party; 1851–1855
Appointed	August Gysin; Free Democratic Party; 1855–1856
Appointed	Rudolf Riggenbach; Free Democratic Party; 1856–1862
Appointed	Anton von Blarer; Free Democratic Party; 1862–1864
Appointed	Emil Remig. Frey; Free Democratic Party; 1864–1868
Appointed	Emanuel Löw; Free Democratic Party; 1868–1869
Appointed	Martin Birmann; Liberal Party; 1869–1890
Appointed	Johann Jakob Stutz; Free Democratic Party; 1890–1913
Appointed	Jakob Buser; Free Democratic Party; 1913–1914
Appointed	Gustav Joh. Schneider; Free Democratic Party; 1914–1932
Appointed	Emil Rudin; Free Democratic Party; 1932–1935
1935	Walter Schaub; Social Democratic Party; 1935–1947
1939	Walter Schaub; Social Democratic Party; 1935–1947
1943	Walter Schaub; Social Democratic Party; 1935–1947
1947	Paul Brodbeck; Free Democratic Party; 1947–1955
1951	Paul Brodbeck; Free Democratic Party; 1947–1955
1955	Emil Müller; Social Democratic Party; 1955–1967
1959	Emil Müller; Social Democratic Party; 1955–1967
1963	Emil Müller; Social Democratic Party; 1955–1967
1967	Werner Jauslin; Free Democratic Party; 1967–1979
1971	Werner Jauslin; Free Democratic Party; 1967–1979
1975	Werner Jauslin; Free Democratic Party; 1967–1979
1979	Eduard Belser; Social Democratic Party; 1979–1987
1983	Eduard Belser; Social Democratic Party; 1979–1987
1987	René Rhinow; Free Democratic Party; 1987–1999
1991	René Rhinow; Free Democratic Party; 1987–1999
1995	René Rhinow; Free Democratic Party; 1987–1999
1999	Hans Fünfschilling; Free Democratic Party; 1999–2007
2003	Hans Fünfschilling; Free Democratic Party; 1999–2007
2007	Claude Janiak; Social Democratic Party; 2007–2019
2011	Claude Janiak; Social Democratic Party; 2007–2019
2015	Claude Janiak; Social Democratic Party; 2007–2019
2019	Maya Graf; Green Party; 2019–present
2023	Maya Graf; Green Party; 2019–present

== Members of the National Council ==
Election	Councillor (Party)	Councillor (Party)	Councillor (Party)	Councillor (Party)	Councillor (Party)	Councillor (Party)	Councillor (Party)
1848	Emil Remig. Frey (FDP/PRD)	Johann Jakob Matt (FDP/PRD)	2 seats 1848–1863				
1849	Emil Remig. Frey (FDP/PRD)	Joh. Heinrich Plattner (FDP/PRD)	2 seats 1848–1863				
1851	Stephan Gutzwiller (FDP/PRD)	Johann Mesmer (FDP/PRD)	2 seats 1848–1863				
1854	Stephan Gutzwiller (FDP/PRD)	Johann Bussinger (FDP/PRD)	2 seats 1848–1863				
1857	Stephan Gutzwiller (FDP/PRD)	Daniel Bieder (FDP/PRD)	2 seats 1848–1863				
1860	Stephan Gutzwiller (FDP/PRD)	Daniel Bieder (FDP/PRD)	2 seats 1848–1863				
1863	Stephan Gutzwiller (FDP/PRD)	Jakob Josef Adam (FDP/PRD)	Jakob B. Graf (FDP/PRD)	3 seats 1863–1911			
1866	Stephan Gutzwiller (FDP/PRD)	Jakob Josef Adam (FDP/PRD)	Johann Jakob Baader (Liberal)	3 seats 1863–1911			
1868	Stephan Gutzwiller (FDP/PRD)	Martin Bider (Liberal)	Johann Jakob Baader (Liberal)	3 seats 1863–1911			
1869	Stephan Gutzwiller (FDP/PRD)	Martin Bider (Liberal)	Emanuel Löw (FDP/PRD)	3 seats 1863–1911			
1872	Emil Joh. Rud. Frey (FDP/PRD)	Jakob B. Graf (FDP/PRD)	Emanuel Löw (FDP/PRD)	3 seats 1863–1911			
1875	Emil Joh. Rud. Frey (FDP/PRD)	Jakob B. Graf (FDP/PRD)	Gedeon Thommen (FDP/PRD)	3 seats 1863–1911			
1878	Emil Joh. Rud. Frey (FDP/PRD)	Jakob B. Graf (FDP/PRD)	Gedeon Thommen (FDP/PRD)	3 seats 1863–1911			
1881	Emil Joh. Rud. Frey (FDP/PRD)	Jakob B. Graf (FDP/PRD)	Gedeon Thommen (FDP/PRD)	3 seats 1863–1911			
1882	Ambrosius Rosenmund (FDP/PRD)	Jakob B. Graf (FDP/PRD)	Gedeon Thommen (FDP/PRD)	3 seats 1863–1911			
1884	Ambrosius Rosenmund (FDP/PRD)	Jakob B. Graf (FDP/PRD)	Gedeon Thommen (FDP/PRD)	3 seats 1863–1911			
1887	Ambrosius Rosenmund (FDP/PRD)	Johann Jakob Stutz (FDP/PRD)	Gedeon Thommen (FDP/PRD)	3 seats 1863–1911			
1890	Ambrosius Rosenmund (FDP/PRD)	Jakob Buser (FDP/PRD)	Emil Joh. Rud. Frey (FDP/PRD)	3 seats 1863–1911			
1891	Ambrosius Rosenmund (FDP/PRD)	Jakob Buser (FDP/PRD)	Johannes Suter (FDP/PRD)	3 seats 1863–1911			
1893	Ambrosius Rosenmund (FDP/PRD)	Jakob Buser (FDP/PRD)	Johannes Suter (FDP/PRD)	3 seats 1863–1911			
1894	Walter F. Meyer (BAB*)	Jakob Buser (FDP/PRD)	Johannes Suter (FDP/PRD)	3 seats 1863–1911			
1896	Walter F. Meyer (BAB*)	Jakob Buser (FDP/PRD)	Johannes Suter (FDP/PRD)	3 seats 1863–1911			
1899	Stephan Gschwind (Grut&PS*)	Jakob Buser (FDP/PRD)	Johannes Suter (FDP/PRD)	3 seats 1863–1911			
1902	Stephan Gschwind (Grut&PS*)	Jakob Buser (FDP/PRD)	Johannes Suter (FDP/PRD)	3 seats 1863–1911			
1904	Albert Schwander (proc Soc*)	Jakob Buser (FDP/PRD)	Johannes Suter (FDP/PRD)	3 seats 1863–1911			
1905	Albert Schwander (proc Soc*)	Jakob Buser (FDP/PRD)	Johannes Suter (FDP/PRD)	3 seats 1863–1911			
1908	Albert Schwander (proc Soc*)	Jakob Buser (FDP/PRD)	Johannes Suter (FDP/PRD)	3 seats 1863–1911			
1911	Albert Schwander (proc Soc*)	Jakob Buser (FDP/PRD)	Johannes Suter (FDP/PRD)	Hermann Straumann (FDP/PRD)	4 seats 1911–1963		
1912	Albert Schwander (proc Soc*)	Jakob Buser (FDP/PRD)	Albert Grieder (FDP/PRD)	Hermann Straumann (FDP/PRD)	4 seats 1911–1963		
1914	Gustav Adolf Seiler (FDP/PRD)	Heinrich O. Strub (FDP/PRD)	Albert Grieder (FDP/PRD)	Hermann Straumann (FDP/PRD)	4 seats 1911–1963		
1917	Gustav Adolf Seiler (FDP/PRD)	Heinrich O. Strub (FDP/PRD)	Albert Grieder (FDP/PRD)	Hermann Straumann (FDP/PRD)	4 seats 1911–1963		
1919	Gustav Adolf Seiler (FDP/PRD)	Karl Adolf Brodtbeck (SP/PS)	Karl Stohler (FDP/PRD)	Carl Tanner (FDP/PRD)	4 seats 1911–1963		
1922	Gustav Adolf Seiler (FDP/PRD)	Karl Adolf Brodtbeck (SP/PS)	Karl Stohler (FDP/PRD)	Adolf Ast (PAB)	4 seats 1911–1963		
1924	Gustav Adolf Seiler (FDP/PRD)	Johann Surbeck (SP/PS)	Karl Stohler (FDP/PRD)	Adolf Ast (PAB)	4 seats 1911–1963		
1925	Gustav Adolf Seiler (FDP/PRD)	Johann Surbeck (SP/PS)	Karl Stohler (FDP/PRD)	Adolf Ast (PAB)	4 seats 1911–1963		
1928	Gustav Adolf Seiler (FDP/PRD)	Johann Surbeck (SP/PS)	Karl von Blarer (Conservative)	Adolf Ast (PAB)	4 seats 1911–1963		
1931	Gustav Adolf Seiler (FDP/PRD)	Johann Surbeck (SP/PS)	Karl Stohler (FDP/PRD)	Adolf Ast (PAB)	4 seats 1911–1963		
1932	Gustav Adolf Seiler (FDP/PRD)	Johann Surbeck (SP/PS)	Arnold Meyer (FDP/PRD)	Adolf Ast (PAB)	4 seats 1911–1963		
1935	Gustav Adolf Seiler (FDP/PRD)	Johann Surbeck (SP/PS)	Rudolf Scheibler (FDP/PRD)	Leo Mann (SP/PS)	4 seats 1911–1963		
1939	Gustav Adolf Seiler (FDP/PRD)	Hugo Gschwind (Conservative)	Hans-Konrad Sonderegger (Ind.)	Leo Mann (SP/PS)	4 seats 1911–1963		
1943	Ernst Boerlin (FDP/PRD)	Walter Hilfiker (SP/PS)	Kurt Leupin (SD/DS)	Leo Mann (SP/PS)	4 seats 1911–1963		
1945	Ernst Boerlin (FDP/PRD)	Albert Ryser (SP/PS)	Kurt Leupin (SD/DS)	Leo Mann (SP/PS)	4 seats 1911–1963		
1947	Ernst Boerlin (FDP/PRD)	Walter Degen (PAB)	Kurt Leupin (SD/DS)	Leo Mann (SP/PS)	4 seats 1911–1963		
1951	Ernst Boerlin (FDP/PRD)	Walter Degen (PAB)	Kurt Leupin (SD/DS)	Albert Ryser (SP/PS)	4 seats 1911–1963		
1952	Ernst Boerlin (FDP/PRD)	Walter Degen (PAB)	Josef Tschopp (Conservative)	Albert Ryser (SP/PS)	4 seats 1911–1963		
1955	Ernst Boerlin (FDP/PRD)	Leo Lejeune (SP/PS)	Josef Tschopp (Conservative)	Fritz Waldner (SP/PS)	4 seats 1911–1963		
1959	Ernst Boerlin (FDP/PRD)	Walter Degen (PAB)	Josef Tschopp (Conservative)	Fritz Waldner (SP/PS)	4 seats 1911–1963		
1963	Fritz Maurer (FDP/PRD)	Walter Degen (PAB)	Josef Tschopp (Conservative)	Fritz Waldner (SP/PS)	Paul Wagner (SP/PS)	5 seats 1963–1971	
1967	Karl Flubacher (FDP/PRD)	Walter Degen (PAB)	Josef Tschopp (Conservative)	Fritz Waldner (SP/PS)	Paul Wagner (SP/PS)	5 seats 1963–1971	
1971	Karl Flubacher (FDP/PRD)	Walter Degen (PAB)	Josef Tschopp (Conservative)	Fritz Waldner (SP/PS)	Paul Wagner (SP/PS)	Claudius Alder (LDU/LdI)	Felix Auer (FDP/PRD)
1975	Karl Flubacher (FDP/PRD)	Hans-Rudolf Feigenwinter (CVP/PDC)	Hans-Rudolf Nebiker (SVP/UDC)	Fritz Waldner (SP/PS)	Paul Wagner (SP/PS)	Claudius Alder (LDU/LdI)	Felix Auer (FDP/PRD)
1979	Karl Flubacher (FDP/PRD)	Hans-Rudolf Feigenwinter (CVP/PDC)	Hans-Rudolf Nebiker (SVP/UDC)	Heinrich Ott (SP/PS)	Paul Wagner (SP/PS)	Claudius Alder (LDU/LdI)	Felix Auer (FDP/PRD)
1983	Karl Flubacher (FDP/PRD)	Hans-Rudolf Feigenwinter (CVP/PDC)	Hans-Rudolf Nebiker (SVP/UDC)	Heinrich Ott (SP/PS)	Paul Wagner (SP/PS)	Angeline Fankhauser (SP/PS)	Felix Auer (FDP/PRD)
1987	Hans Rudolf Gysin (FDP/PRD)	Hans-Rudolf Feigenwinter (CVP/PDC)	Hans-Rudolf Nebiker (SVP/UDC)	Heinrich Ott (SP/PS)	Susanne Leutenegger Oberholzer (POCH)	Angeline Fankhauser (SP/PS)	Felix Auer (FDP/PRD)
1990	Hans Rudolf Gysin (FDP/PRD)	Hans-Rudolf Feigenwinter (CVP/PDC)	Hans-Rudolf Nebiker (SVP/UDC)	Theo Meyer (SP/PS)	Susanne Leutenegger Oberholzer (POCH)	Angeline Fankhauser (SP/PS)	Felix Auer (FDP/PRD)
1991	Hans Rudolf Gysin (FDP/PRD)	Ruth Gonseth (GPS/PES)	Hans-Rudolf Nebiker (SVP/UDC)	Theo Meyer (SP/PS)	Rudolf Keller (SD/DS)	Angeline Fankhauser (SP/PS)	Christian Miesch (FDP/PRD)
1995	Hans Rudolf Gysin (FDP/PRD)	Ruth Gonseth (GPS/PES)	Hans-Rudolf Nebiker (SVP/UDC)	Theo Meyer (SP/PS)	Rudolf Keller (SD/DS)	Angeline Fankhauser (SP/PS)	Rudolf Imhof (CVP/PDC)
1998	Hans Rudolf Gysin (FDP/PRD)	Ruth Gonseth (GPS/PES)	Caspar Baader (SVP/UDC)	Theo Meyer (SP/PS)	Rudolf Keller (SD/DS)	Angeline Fankhauser (SP/PS)	Rudolf Imhof (CVP/PDC)
1999	Hans Rudolf Gysin (FDP/PRD)	Ruth Gonseth (GPS/PES)	Caspar Baader (SVP/UDC)	Claude Janiak (SP/PS)	Paul Kurrus (FDP/PRD)	Susanne Leutenegger Oberholzer (SP/PS)	Rudolf Imhof (CVP/PDC)
2001	Hans Rudolf Gysin (FDP/PRD)	Maya Graf (GPS/PES)	Caspar Baader (SVP/UDC)	Claude Janiak (SP/PS)	Paul Kurrus (FDP/PRD)	Susanne Leutenegger Oberholzer (SP/PS)	Rudolf Imhof (CVP/PDC)
2003	Hans Rudolf Gysin (FDP/PRD)	Maya Graf (GPS/PES)	Caspar Baader (SVP/UDC)	6 seats 2003–2011	Christian Miesch (SVP/UDC)	Susanne Leutenegger Oberholzer (SP/PS)	Walter Jermann (CVP/PDC)
2007	Eric Nussbaumer (SP/PS)	Maya Graf (GPS/PES)	Caspar Baader (SVP/UDC)	6 seats 2003–2011	Christian Miesch (SVP/UDC)	Susanne Leutenegger Oberholzer (SP/PS)	Kathrin Amacker-Amann (CVP/PDC)
2010	Eric Nussbaumer (SP/PS)	Maya Graf (GPS/PES)	Caspar Baader (SVP/UDC)	6 seats 2003–2011	Christian Miesch (SVP/UDC)	Susanne Leutenegger Oberholzer (SP/PS)	Elisabeth Schneider-Schneiter (CVP/PDC)
2011	Eric Nussbaumer (SP/PS)	Maya Graf (GPS/PES)	Caspar Baader (SVP/UDC)	Daniela Schneeberger (FDP.The Liberals)	Thomas de Courten (SVP/UDC)	Susanne Leutenegger Oberholzer (SP/PS)	Elisabeth Schneider-Schneiter (CVP/PDC)
2014	Eric Nussbaumer (SP/PS)	Maya Graf (GPS/PES)	Christian Miesch (SVP/UDC)	Daniela Schneeberger (FDP.The Liberals)	Thomas de Courten (SVP/UDC)	Susanne Leutenegger Oberholzer (SP/PS)	Elisabeth Schneider-Schneiter (CVP/PDC)
2015	Eric Nussbaumer (SP/PS)	Maya Graf (GPS/PES)	Sandra Sollberger (SVP/UDC)	Daniela Schneeberger (FDP.The Liberals)	Thomas de Courten (SVP/UDC)	Susanne Leutenegger Oberholzer (SP/PS)	Elisabeth Schneider-Schneiter (CVP/PDC)
2019	Eric Nussbaumer (SP/PS)	Florence Brenzikofer (Note: Graf was elected to the Council of States and Brenzikofer filled her vacant National Council seat) (GPS/PES)	Sandra Sollberger (SVP/UDC)	Daniela Schneeberger (FDP.The Liberals)	Thomas de Courten (SVP/UDC)	Samira Marti (SP/PS)	Elisabeth Schneider-Schneiter (CVP/PDC)
2023	Eric Nussbaumer (SP/PS)	Florence Brenzikofer (GPS/PES)	Sandra Sollberger (SVP/UDC)	Daniela Schneeberger (FDP.The Liberals)	Thomas de Courten (SVP/UDC)	Samira Marti (SP/PS)	Elisabeth Schneider-Schneiter (CVP/PDC)
