= 1910 Swiss electoral system referendum =

Referendum in Switzerland

23 October 1910
- Federal popular initiative "for the proportional representation of the National Council"

Results
Choice	Votes	%
Yes	240,305	47.54%
No	265,194	52.46%
Valid votes	505,499	98.44%
Invalid or blank votes	8,035	1.56%
Total votes	513,534	100.00%
Registered voters/turnout	823,679	62.35%

A referendum on the electoral system was held in Switzerland on 23 October 1910. Voters were asked whether they approved of introducing proportional representation for National Council elections. Although the proposal was approved by a majority of cantons, it was rejected by 52.5% of voters. This was the second such referendum, after the one in 1900 also failed. However, a third referendum on the same issue was held in 1918, and passed with 66.8% in favour.

== Background ==
The referendum was a public initiative, which required a double majority; a majority of the popular vote and majority of the cantons. The decision of each canton was based on the vote in that canton. Full cantons counted as one vote, whilst half cantons counted as half.

== Results ==
Choice	Popular vote		Cantons		
Choice	Votes	%	Full	Half	Total
For	240,305	47.5	10	4	12
Against	265,194	52.5	9	2	10
Blank votes	6,064	–	–	–	–
Invalid votes	1,971	–	–	–	–
Total	513,534	100	19	6	22
Registered voters/turnout	823,679	62.3	–	–	–
Source: Nohlen & Stöver
