= Bern People's Party =

The Bern People's Party (German: Bernische Volkspartei, BVP; French: Parti populaire bernois, PPB) was a Protestant conservative political party in Switzerland.

== History ==
The BVP was established in 1882. It ran eight candidates in the Bern-Oberaargau and Bern-Seeland constituencies in the 1884 federal elections, but failed to win a seat. However, Johannes Schär the BVP's first member of the National Council after winning a by-election in Bern-Oberaargau on 9 May 1886.

In the 1887 elections the party put forward nine candidates in the Bern-Emmental and Bern-Oberaargau constituencies. Schär was re-elected in Oberaargau, alongside Emil Elsässer and Ulrich Burkhalter; Schär and Elsässer were elected in the first round of voting and Burkhalter in the second. In the 1890 elections the party only contested Bern-Oberaargau; four candidates were nominated, including Burkhalter and Schär, but only Burkhalter was re-elected.

The same four candidates contested the 1893 elections in Bern-Oberaargau, and although Burkhalter was re-elected again, he joined the Liberal group after the elections. In the 1896 elections party founder Ulrich Dürrenmatt was its only candidate, again running in Bern-Oberaargau and failing to win a seat. The 1899 elections saw BVP candidates Dürrenmatt and Johann Egger contest Bern-Oberaargau, again failing to win a seat.

Although Dürrenmatt was its only candidate in the 1902 elections, he was elected in Bern-Oberaargau in the first round of voting. He was re-elected in the 1905 elections (as the party's sole candidate) in the second round of voting; he died in 1908, a few months before the 1908 elections. Hugo Dürrenmatt was the party's only candidate in the 1908 elections, but failed to win a seat. The party did not contest the 1911 elections.
