= Peter Hegglin =

Swiss politician (born 1960)

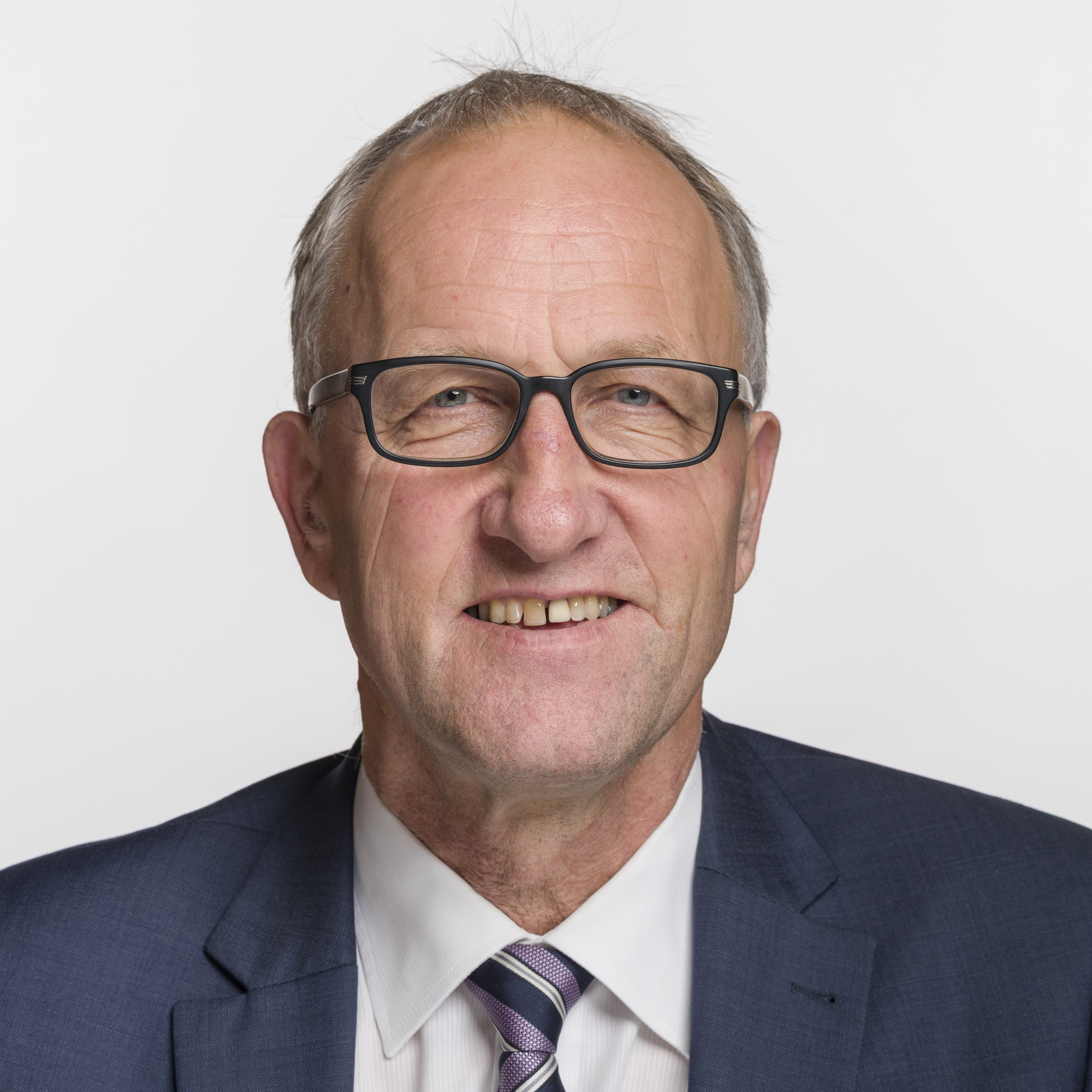

Member of the Council of States of Switzerland
- Incumbent
- Assumed office 30 November 2015
- Constituency: Zug

Personal details
- Born: 25 December 1960 (age 65) Menzingen, Zug, Switzerland

Peter Hegglin (born 25 December 1960 in Menzingen) is a Swiss politician who is a member of the Council of States.

== Biography ==
Hegglin was elected in 2019. Hegglin is affiliated with The Centre.
