= Susanne Leutenegger Oberholzer =

Swiss politician

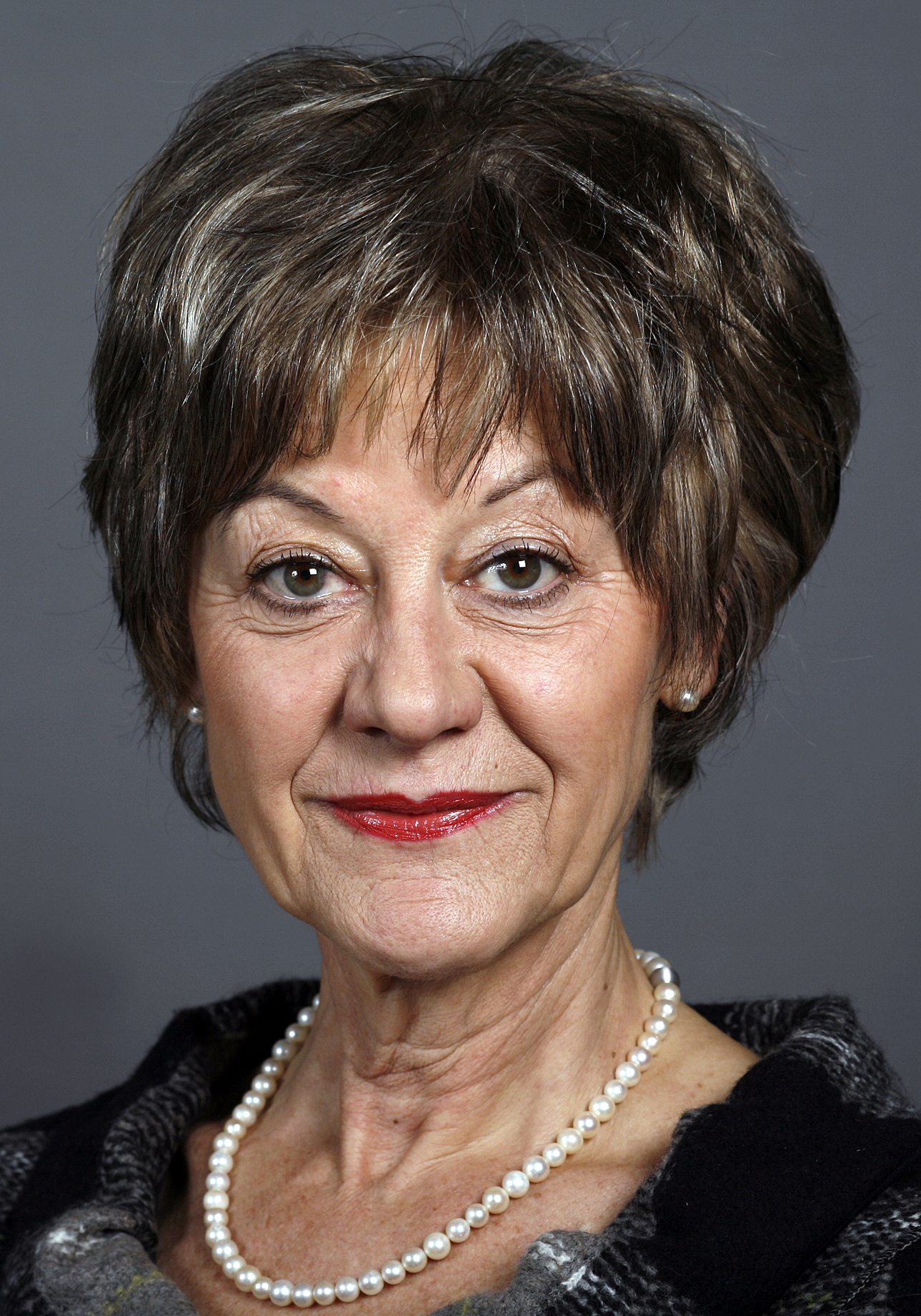
- Susanne Leutenegger Oberholzer in 2007

National Councillor
- In office 6 December 1999 – 7 December 2018
- Succeeded by: Samira Marti
- In office 1 December 1987 – 24 November 1991

Personal details
- Born: 6 March 1948 (age 78) Chur, Grisons
- Party: Social Democratic Party of Switzerland
- Education: University of Basel
- Occupation: Lawyer

Susanne Leutenegger Oberholzer (born 6 March 1948 in Chur, Grisons) is a politician of the Social Democratic Party of Switzerland. She was a National Councillor from 1987 to 1991, then again from 1999 to 2018.

== Life and career ==
After she earned a licenciate degree in economics from the University of Basel, she worked as an economist and an economic journalist. She later resumed her law studies and subsequently worked in the central secretary office of a labour union. In 1999, she earned the lawyer diploma in Basel, where she has been working since 2002.

Leutenegger Oberholzer was first involved in politics within the Progressive Organizations of Switzerland which she represented in the Grand Council of Basel-Stadt from 1983 to 1989 and in the National Council from 1987 to 1991. She joined the Social Democratic Party in 1993 and served as a Socialist National Councillor from 1999 until she resigned in 2018. She was replaced by fellow Socialist Samira Marti from 10 December 2018.

== See also ==
- List of members of the Federal Assembly from the Canton of Basel-Landschaft
- List of members of the National Council of Switzerland, 2011–15
- List of members of the National Council of Switzerland, 2007–11
- List of members of the National Council of Switzerland, 2003–07
