= Circle of Rhine Party =

Political party in Switzerland

The Circle of Rhine Party (German: Rheinkreispartei; French: Parti du Cercle du Rhin) was a political party in Switzerland led by Josef Jäger.

== History ==
The party was established in 1905 as a breakaway from the Free Democratic Party in Aargau. In the 1908 federal elections it put forward two candidates in Aargau-Nord, Jäger and Arnold Doser, but failed to win a seat. In the 1911 federal elections it ran three candidates in Aargau-Nord, winning one seat, taken by Jäger. The following year it merged back into the FDP.
