= Florence Brenzikofer =

Swiss politician

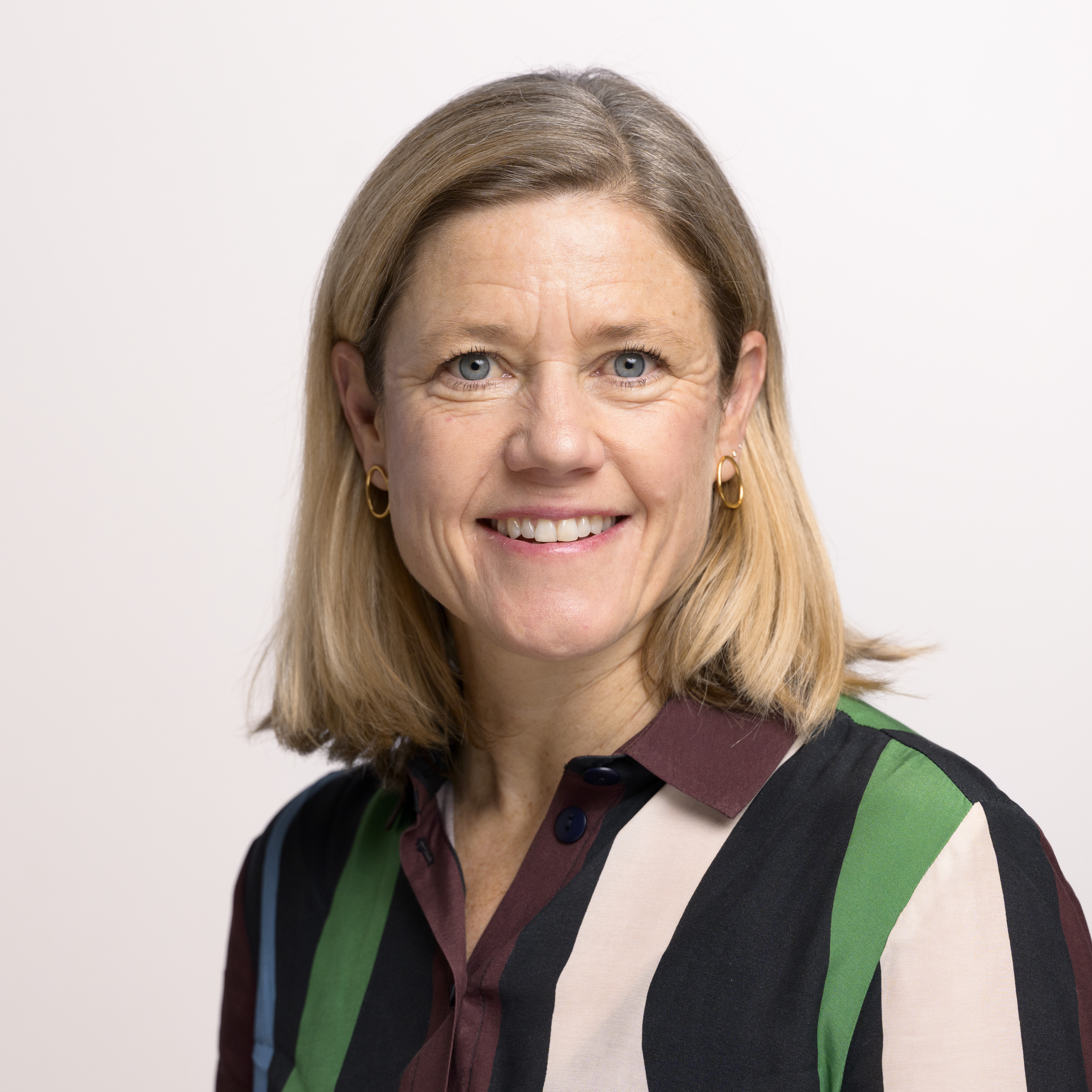
- Florence Brenzikofer in 2023.

National Councillor for Basel-Landschaft
- Incumbent
- Assumed office 9 December 2019
- Preceded by: Maya Graf

Personal details
- Born: 15 April 1975 (age 51) Binningen, Basel-Landschaft
- Party: Green Party of Switzerland
- Education: University of Fribourg; University of Bern

Florence Brenzikofer (born 15 April 1975 in Binningen, Basel-Landschaft) is a politician of the Green Party of Switzerland who has been a member of the National Council since 2019.

== Career ==
Brenzikofer enrolled at the University of Fribourg in 1996 studying art history and French literature and studied at Paris 8 University Vincennes-Saint-Denis for a year in 1998. She then trained to be a secondary school teacher at the University of Bern.

From 2003 to 2005, she was a member of the Landrat of Basel-Landschaft and again from 2013 to 2019, after the resignation of Sarah Martin.

In 2019, Maya Graf was elected to both Basel-Landschaft's seat in the Council of States and one of its seats in the National Council. As Graf moved to sit in the Council of States, Brenzikofer took up the vacant seat in the National Council. She entered office on 9 December 2019.

Brenzikofer has supported local food initiatives, more affordable public transport for young people, and increased transparency in the Swiss banking sector.

== See also ==
- List of members of the Federal Assembly from the Canton of Basel-Landschaft
- List of members of the National Council of Switzerland, 2019–23
