= Samira Marti =

Swiss politician (born 1994)

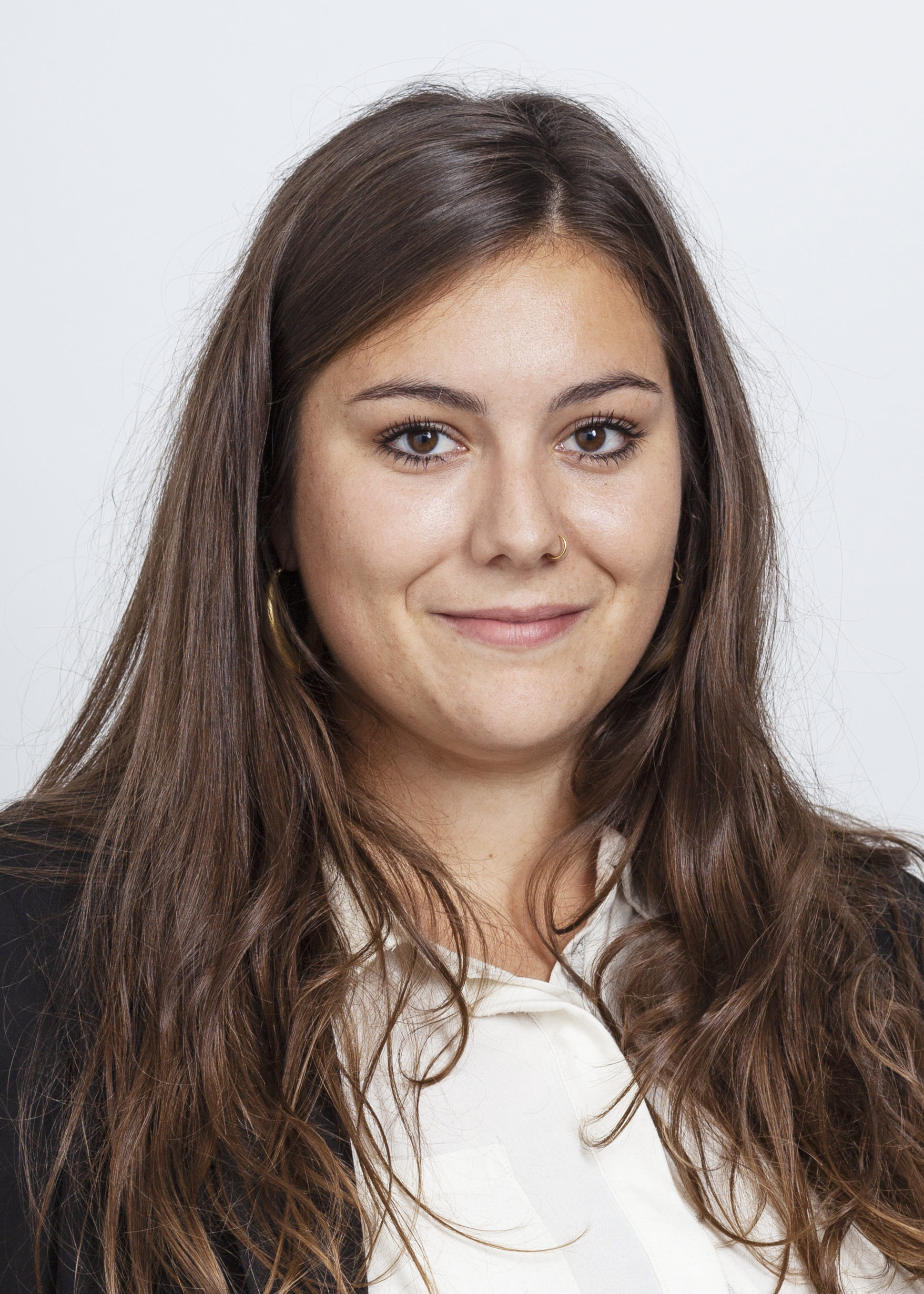
- Samira Marti in 2018.

National Councillor for Basel-Landschaft
- Incumbent
- Assumed office 10 December 2018
- Preceded by: Susanne Leutenegger Oberholzer (resigned)

Personal details
- Born: 23 January 1994 (age 32) Liestal, Basel-Landschaft
- Party: Social Democratic Party of Switzerland
- Education: University of Zurich

Samira Marti (born 23 January 1994) is a politician of the Social Democratic Party of Switzerland. She became a National Councillor in December 2018.

== Life and career ==
Marti grew up in the village of Ziefen in the canton of Basel-Landschaft. She studied economics at the University of Zurich. Before she sat in Parliament, she worked part-time as a waitress.

In December 2018, she became a National Councillor for Basel-Landschaft after the resignation of Susanne Leutenegger Oberholzer. At the age of 24, she was the second youngest ever member to take office in the National Council after Pascale Bruderer (who was two months younger than her). She was the youngest member of the National Council until the 2019 federal election.

After her first days in Parliament, she stated: "I knew the right-wing was the majority, but seeing with my own eyes these fifty-something people peacefully destroy our future by pushing a button was an exceptionally intense experience."

== See also ==
- List of members of the Federal Assembly from the Canton of Basel-Landschaft
