= Liselotte Spreng =

Swiss politician (1912–1992)

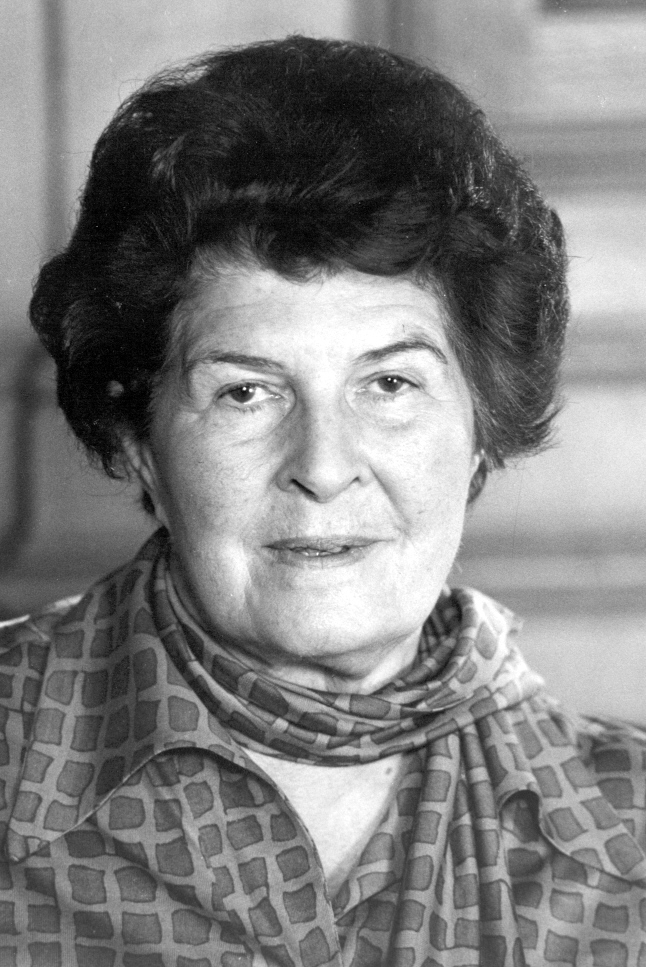

National Councillor
- In office 29 November 1971 – 27 November 1983

Member of the Grand Council of Fribourg
- In office 1971–1976

Personal details
- Born: 2 February 1912 Biel/Bienne, Switzerland
- Died: 25 November 1992 (aged 80) Villars-sur-Glâne, Switzerland
- Party: FDP.The Liberals
- Education: University of Bern; University of Lausanne
- Occupation: Physician

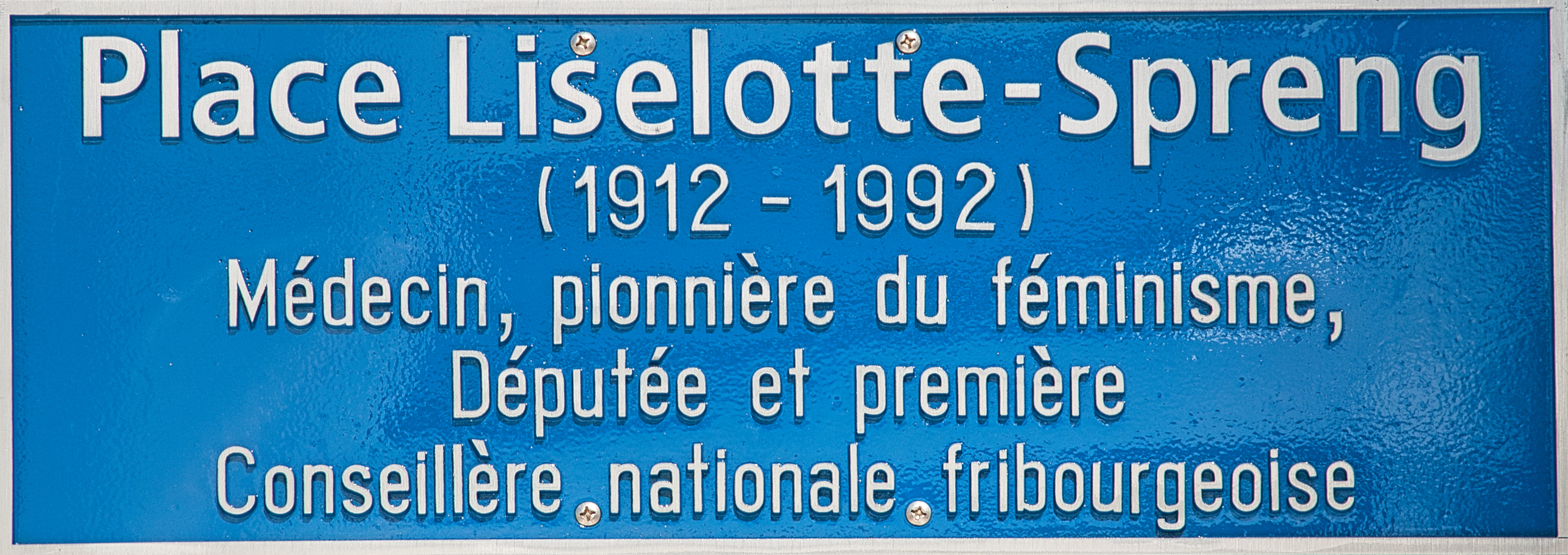
Square in honour of Liselotte Spreng in Freiburg

Liselotte Spreng (15 February 1912 – 25 November 1992) was a Swiss women's rights activist and politician. She was the first female National Councillor from the canton of Fribourg.

== Life and career ==
Liselotte Spreng was born in 1912 in Biel/Bienne to a physician. She studied medicine at the universities of Bern and Lausanne and opened a surgery with her husband in Fribourg in 1941. She was among the first women physicians in the canton.

Spreng campaigned for women's suffrage and became the chairwoman of the Fribourg Organisation for Women's Suffrage in 1967. After women's suffrage was introduced in the canton of Fribourg in 1971, Spreng represented The Liberals in the Grand Council of Fribourg. In 1971, she was elected as the first female representative of the canton of Fribourg to the National Council, where she sat until 1983. She was primarily involved family law, charity, medicine and ethics.

== See also ==
- List of members of the Federal Assembly from the Canton of Fribourg
- List of the first women holders of political offices in Europe
