= 1918 Swiss referendums =

Two referendums were held in Switzerland during 1918. The first was held on 2 June on introducing a direct federal tax, and was rejected by a majority of voters and cantons. The second was held on 13 October 1918 on introducing proportional representation for National Council elections, and was approved by a majority of voters and cantons. As a result, proportional representation was introduced in the 1919 elections.

== Background ==
Both referendums were popular initiatives, which required a double majority; a majority of the popular vote and majority of the cantons. The decision of each canton was based on the vote in that canton. Full cantons counted as one vote, whilst half cantons counted as half.

== Results ==
=== Federal tax ===
Choice	Popular vote		Cantons		
Choice	Votes	%	Full	Half	Total
For	276,735	45.9	6	3	7.5
Against	325,814	54.1	13	3	14.5
Blank votes	4,332	–	–	–	–
Invalid votes	5,290	–	–	–	–
Total	612,171	100	19	6	22
Registered voters/turnout	936,096	65.4	–	–	–
Source: Nohlen & Stöver

=== Proportional representation ===
Choice	Popular vote		Cantons		
Choice	Votes	%	Full	Half	Total
For	299,550	66.8	17	5	19.5
Against	149,035	33.2	2	1	2.5
Blank votes	8,892	–	–	–	–
Invalid votes	5,825	–	–	–	–
Total	463,304	100	19	6	22
Registered voters/turnout	936,336	49.5	–	–	–
Source: Nohlen & Stöver
