= Nadine Gobet =

Swiss politician (born 1969)

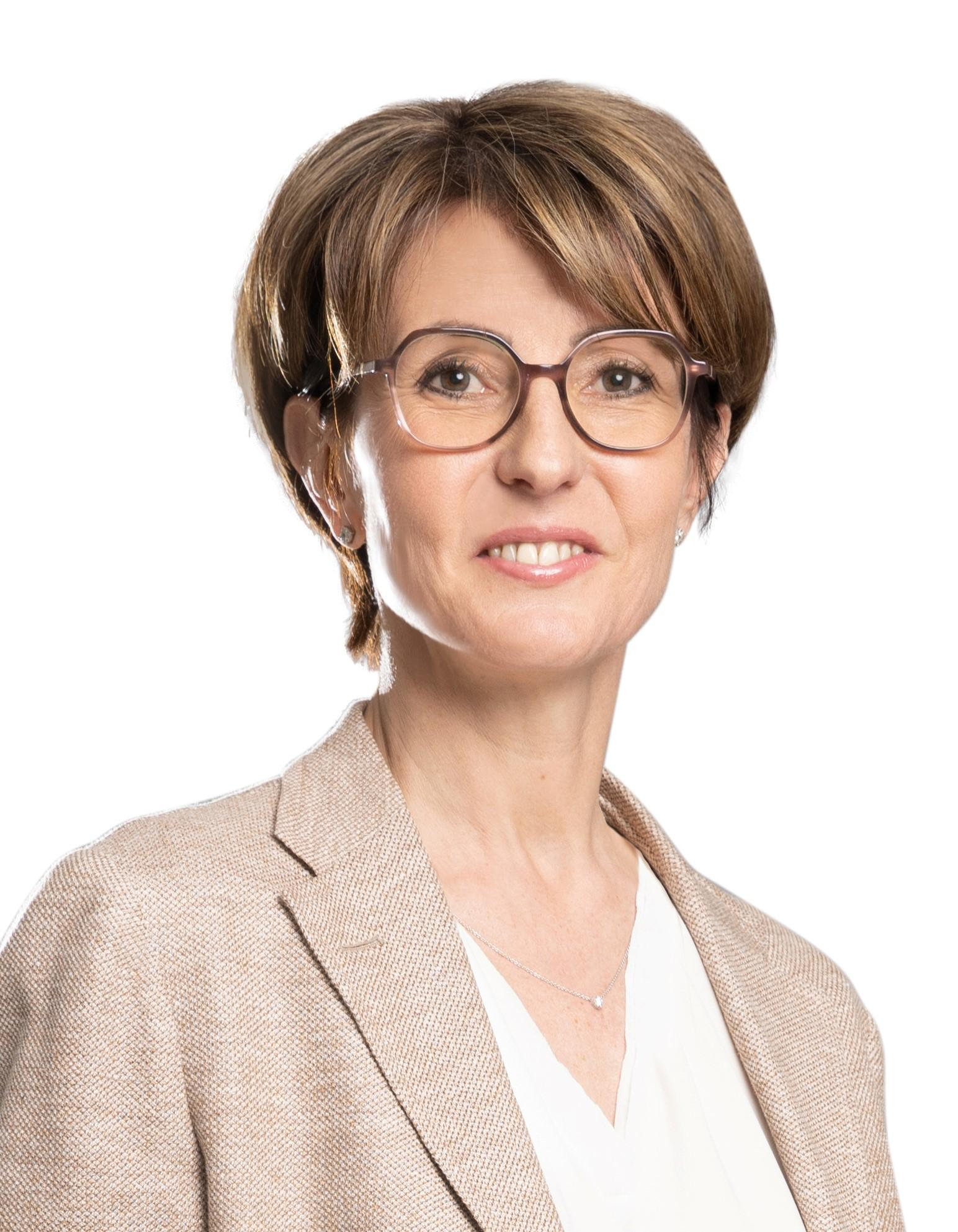
Nadine Gobet

Nadine Gobet was born on November 18, 1969, in Romont. She is a Swiss politician and a member of the Liberals (Switzerland).

In October 2023 she was elected deputy of the Canton of Fribourg at the National Council.

== Biography ==
Nadine Gobet was born on November 18, 1969, in Romont, in Canton of Fribourg. She originally comes from Massonens, in the Glâne District. She has two younger brothers. Their father, Jean-Élie, member of the Christian Democratic People's Party of Switzerland, works for the Swiss Post. Her family lived in Lausanne when she was born and moved to Romont when she was 4 years old.

She went to school in Romont, and pursued her secondary school at the Collège Sainte-Croix à Fribourg. She then studies law at the Law faculty of the University of Fribourg, when she obtains a Masters in July 1994.

In the same year, she is hired by the Economic and Employer's Federation of the Canton of Fribourg, in Bulle. She becomes deputy director to the federation in 2006, and director in September 2015. In parallel, she is nominated as a judge to the Court of Glâne in 1996.

She lives in Bulle since 2017.

== Political career ==
She sits on the Grand Council of Fribourg since the end of 2006.

She was a candidate to the National Council of the Canton of Fribourg in 2015 and 2019. She was elected in October 2023
