= 1902 Swiss federal election =

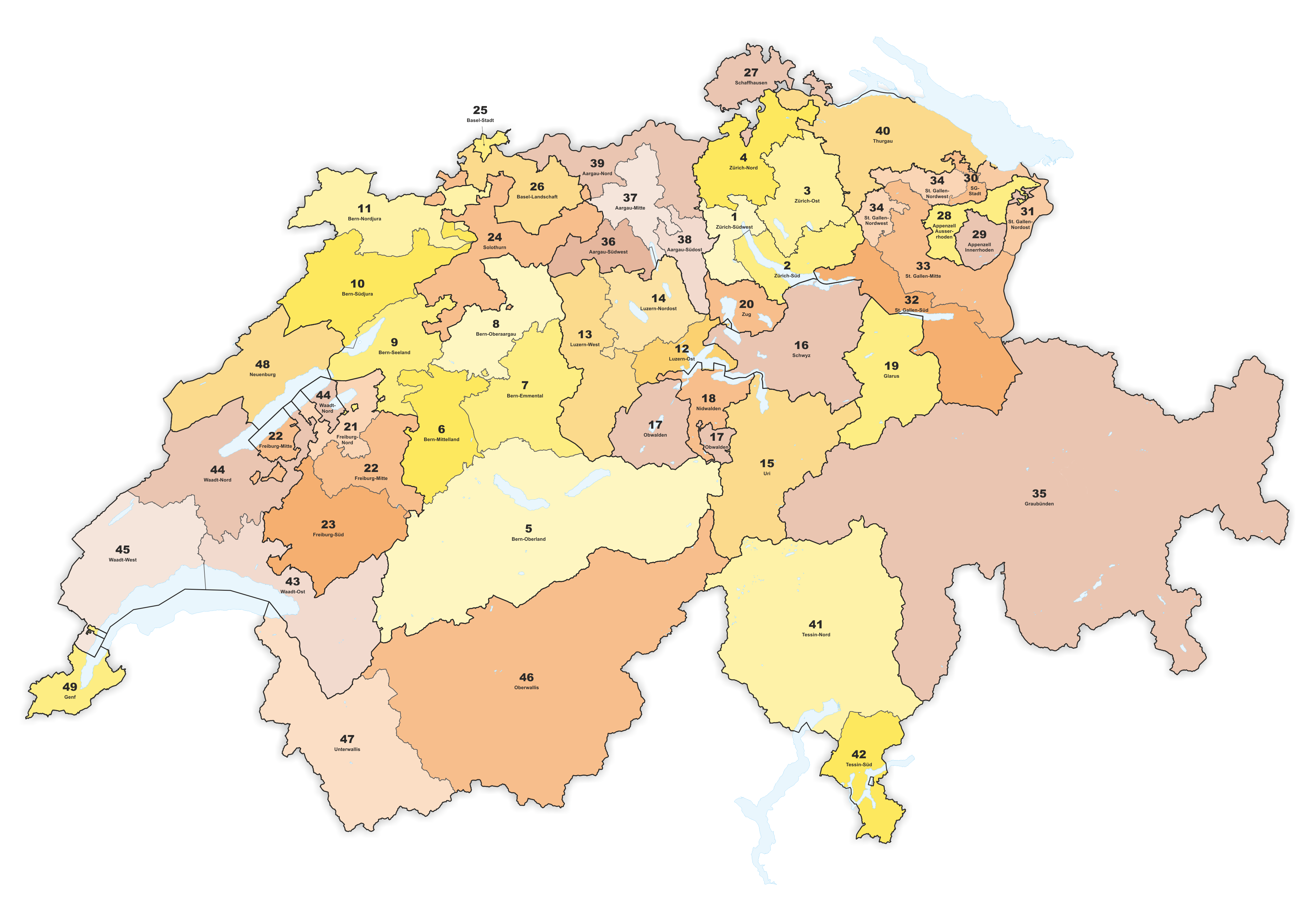
The 49 electoral districts

Federal elections were held in Switzerland on 26 October 1902. The Free Democratic Party retained its majority in the National Council.

== Electoral system ==
The 167 members of the National Council were elected in 49 single and multi-member constituencies using a three-round system. Candidates had to receive a majority in the first or second round to be elected; if it went to a third round, only a plurality was required. Voters could cast as many votes as there were seats in their constituency. There was one seat for every 20,000 citizens, with seats allocated to cantons in proportion to their population.

The elections were held under the Federal law concerning the constituencies for the elections of National Council members passed on 4 June 1902, which reduced the number of constituencies from 52 to 49. Following the 1900 census the number of seats was increased from 147 to 167; Zürich gained five seats, Basel-Stadt, Bern, Geneva, St. Gallen and Vaud all gained two seats, whilst Neuchâtel, Solothurn, Ticino, Thurgau and Valais all gained one. A referendum on introducing proportional representation and direct elections for the Federal Council had been held in 1900, but both proposals were rejected by voters.

== Results ==
Voter turnout was highest in Schaffhausen (where voting was compulsory) at 85.8% and lowest in Obwalden at 21.4%.

Party	Votes	%	Seats	+/–
Free Democratic Party	205,235	50.39	100	+16
Catholic People's Party	94,031	23.09	35	+3
Social Democratic Party	51,338	12.60	7	+3
Liberal Centre	34,928	8.58	20	0
Democratic Group	15,053	3.70	4	–3
Bern People's Party	6,737	1.65	1	New
Others	6,737	1.65	0	0
Total	407,322	100.00	167	+20
Valid votes	407,322	94.36		
Invalid/blank votes	24,348	5.64		
Total votes	431,670	100.00		
Registered voters/turnout	760,252	56.78		
Source: Mackie & Rose, BFS (seats)

=== By constituency ===
Constituency	Seats	Party	Seats won	Elected members
Zürich 1	9	Free Democratic Party	4	Emil Zürcher; Alfred Frey; Johann Jakob Amsler; Albert Studler
Zürich 1	9	Liberal Centre	2	Hans Konrad Pestalozzi; Ulrich Meister Jr.
Zürich 1	9	Social Democratic Party	2	Jakob Vogelsanger; Herman Greulich
Zürich 1	9	Democratic Group	1	Friedrich Fritschi
Zürich 2	5	Free Democratic Party	3	Heinrich Hess; Johann Rudolf Amsler; Samuel Wanner
Zürich 2	5	Liberal Centre	2	Johann Jakob Abegg; Heinrich Berchtold
Zürich 3	5	Free Democratic Party	4	Rudolf Geilinger; Emil Stadler Sr.; Albert Kündig; Eduard Sulzer
Zürich 3	5	Social Democratic Party	1	Friedrich Studer
Zürich 4	3	Free Democratic Party	3	Johann Konrad Hörni; Jakob Walder; Jakob Heinrich Hauser
Bern 5	5	Free Democratic Party	5	Arnold Gottlieb Bühler; Matthäus Zurbuchen; Johann Jakob Rebmann; Johann Friedrich Michel; Emil Lohner
Bern 6	6	Free Democratic Party	4	Johann Hirter; Johann Jenny; Friedrich Bürgi; Eugen Huber
Bern 6	6	Liberal Centre	2	Edmund von Steiger; Ernst Wyss
Bern 7	4	Free Democratic Party	4	Fritz Zumstein; Adolf Müller; Fritz Bühlmann; Johann Jakob Schär
Bern 8	4	Free Democratic Party	3	Hans Dinkelmann; Michael Hofer; Arnold Gugelmann
Bern 8	4	Bern People's Party	1	Ulrich Dürrenmatt
Bern 9	4	Free Democratic Party	4	Eduard Bähler; Eduard Will; Johannes Zimmermann; Jakob Freiburghaus
Bern 10	3	Free Democratic Party	3	Virgile Rossel; Albert Gobat; Albert Locher
Bern 11	3	Catholic Right	2	Joseph Choquard; Ernest Daucourt
Bern 11	3	Free Democratic Party	1	Louis Joliat
Lucerne 12	3	Free Democratic Party	3	Peter Knüsel; Hermann Heller; Franz Bucher
Lucerne 13	2	Catholic Right	3	Candid Hochstrasser; Theodor Schmid
Lucerne 14	2	Catholic Right	2	Josef Anton Schobinger; Dominik Fellmann
Uri 15	1	Catholic Right	1	Franz Schmid
Schwyz 16	3	Catholic Right	3	Josef Anton Ferdinand Büeler; Vital Schwander Sr.; Nikolaus Benziger
Obwalden 17	1	Catholic Right	1	Peter Anton Ming
Nidwalden 18	1	Catholic Right	1	Karl Niederberger
Glarus 19	2	Democratic Group	1	Eduard Blumer
Glarus 19	2	Free Democratic Party	1	Rudolf Gallati
Zug 20	1	Free Democratic Party	1	Klemens Iten
Fribourg 21	2	Catholic Right	1	Louis de Diesbach
Fribourg 21	2	Free Democratic Party	1	Constant Dinichert
Fribourg 22	2	Catholic Right	2	Aloys Bossy; Vincent Gottofrey
Fribourg 23	2	Catholic Right	2	Alphonse Théraulaz; Eugène Grand
Solothurn 24	5	Free Democratic Party	4	Jakob Zimmermann; Albert Brosi; Wilhelm Vigier; Eduard Bally
Solothurn 24	5	Catholic Right	1	Franz Josef Hänggi
Basel-Stadt 25	6	Free Democratic Party	3	Heinrich David; Johann Emil Müry; Otto Zoller
Basel-Stadt 25	6	Liberal Centre	2	Isaak Iselin-Sarasin; Paul Speiser
Basel-Stadt 25	6	Social Democratic Party	1	Alfred Brüstlein
Basel-Landschaft 26	3	Free Democratic Party	2	Jakob Buser; Johannes Suter
Basel-Landschaft 26	3	Bauern- und Arbeiterbund	1	Stephan Gschwind
Schaffhausen 27	2	Free Democratic Party	2	Robert Grieshaber; Carl Spahn
Appenzell Ausserrhoden 28	3	Free Democratic Party	3	Arthur Eugster; Johann Jakob Sonderegger; Johann Konrad Eisenhut
Appenzell Innerhoden 29	1	Liberal Centre	1	Karl Justin Sonderegger
St. Gallen 30	3	Free Democratic Party	1	Karl Emil Wild
St. Gallen 30	3	Democratic Group	1	J. A. Scherrer-Füllemann
St. Gallen 30	3	Social Democratic Party	1	Paul Brandt
St. Gallen 31	3	Catholic Right	2	Johann Gebhard Lutz; Johann Jakob Gächter
St. Gallen 31	3	Social Democratic Party	1	Heinrich Scherrer
St. Gallen 32	2	Catholic Right	2	Johann Baptist Schubiger; Ferdinand Hidber
St. Gallen 33	3	Free Democratic Party	3	Carl Hilty; Ernst Wagner; Johann Jakob Bösch
St. Gallen 34	2	Catholic Right	2	Othmar Staub; Thomas Holenstein Sr.
Grisons 35	5	Free Democratic Party	3	Johann Anton Caflisch; Andrea Vital; Eduard Walser
Grisons 35	5	Liberal Centre	1	Alfred von Planta
Grisons 35	5	Catholic Right	1	Caspar Decurtins
Aargau 36	3	Free Democratic Party	3	Arnold Künzli; Johann Rudolf Suter; Jakob Lüthy
Aargau 37	3	Free Democratic Party	3	Max Alphonse Erismann; Olivier Zschokke; Hans Müri
Aargau 38	1	Catholic Right	1	Jakob Nietlispach
Aargau 39	3	Liberal Centre	1	Emil Albert Baldinger
Aargau 39	3	Catholic Right	1	Franz Xaver Eggspühler
Aargau 39	3	Free Democratic Party	1	Josef Jäger
Thurgau 40	6	Free Democratic Party	5	Carl Eigenmann; Johann Konrad Egloff Jr.; Karl Alfred Fehr; Adolf Germann; Jakob Müller
Thurgau 40	6	Democratic Group	1	Emil Hofmann
Ticino 41	4	Free Democratic Party	3	Achille Borella; Emilio Censi; Antonio Soldini
Ticino 41	4	Catholic Right	1	Giovanni Lurati
Ticino 42	3	Free Democratic Party	2	Alfredo Pioda; Giuseppe Stoffel
Ticino 42	3	Catholic Right	1	Giuseppe Motta
Vaud 43	7	Free Democratic Party	4	Isaac Oyex; Alphonse Dubuis; Émile Gaudard; Charles-Eugène Fonjallaz
Vaud 43	7	Liberal Centre	3	Alois de Meuron; Édouard Secretan; Émile Vuichoud
Vaud 44	4	Free Democratic Party	4	Camille Decoppet; Ernest Rubattel; Jean Cavat; Jules Roulet
Vaud 45	3	Free Democratic Party	2	Juste Lagier; Adrien Thélin
Vaud 45	3	Liberal Centre	1	Louis-Charles Delarageaz
Valais 46	4	Catholic Right	4	Gustav Loretan; Joseph Kuntschen Sr.; Raymond Evéquoz; Alfred Perrig
Valais 47	2	Free Democratic Party	1	Camille Défayes
Valais 47	2	Catholic Right	1	Henri Bioley
Neuchâtel 48	6	Free Democratic Party	5	Louis-Alexandre Martin; Paul-Ernest Mosimann; Jules-Albert Piguet; Louis Perrier; Frédéric Soguel
Neuchâtel 48	6	Liberal Centre	1	Jules Calame
Geneva 49	7	Liberal Centre	4	Gustave Ador; Édouard Odier; Marc-Joseph Bonnet; Jacques Rutty
Geneva 49	7	Free Democratic Party	2	Alfred Vincent; Henri Fazy
Geneva 49	7	Catholic Right	1	Théodore Fontana
Source: Gruner
