= 1900 Swiss referendums =

Three referendums were held in Switzerland during 1900. The first was held on 20 May on a federal law on health, accident and military insurance, and was rejected by 69.8% of voters. The second and third were held on 4 November on introducing proportional representation for National Council elections and the direct election and increase in members of the Federal Council. Both were rejected by a majority of voters and cantons.

== Background ==
The referendums on the changes to the National and Federal Councils were popular initiatives, which required a double majority; a majority of the popular vote and majority of the cantons. The decision of each canton was based on the vote in that canton. Full cantons counted as one vote, whilst half cantons counted as half. The insurance referendum was an optional referendum, which required only a majority of the public vote.

== Results ==
=== Accident, health and military insurance ===
Choice	Votes	%
For	148,035	30.2
Against	341,914	69.8
Blank votes	5,636	–
Invalid votes	1,765	–
Total	497,350	100
Registered voters/turnout	745,228	66.7
Source: Nohlen & Stöver

=== Introducing proportional representation for National Council elections ===
Choice	Popular vote		Cantons		
Choice	Votes	%	Full	Half	Total
For	169,008	40.9	9	3	10.5
Against	244,666	59.1	10	3	11.5
Blank votes	17,539	–	–	–	–
Invalid votes	7,898	–	–	–	–
Total	439,111	100	19	6	22
Registered voters/turnout	747,262	58.8	–	–	–
Source: Nohlen & Stöver

=== Introducing direct elections for an enlarged Federal Council ===
Choice	Popular vote		Cantons		
Choice	Votes	%	Full	Half	Total
For	145,926	35.0	7	2	8
Against	270,522	65.0	12	4	14
Blank votes	15,734	–	–	–	–
Invalid votes	7,316	–	–	–	–
Total	439,498	100	19	6	22
Registered voters/turnout	747,262	58.8	–	–	–
Source: Nohlen & Stöver
