= 1905 Swiss federal election =

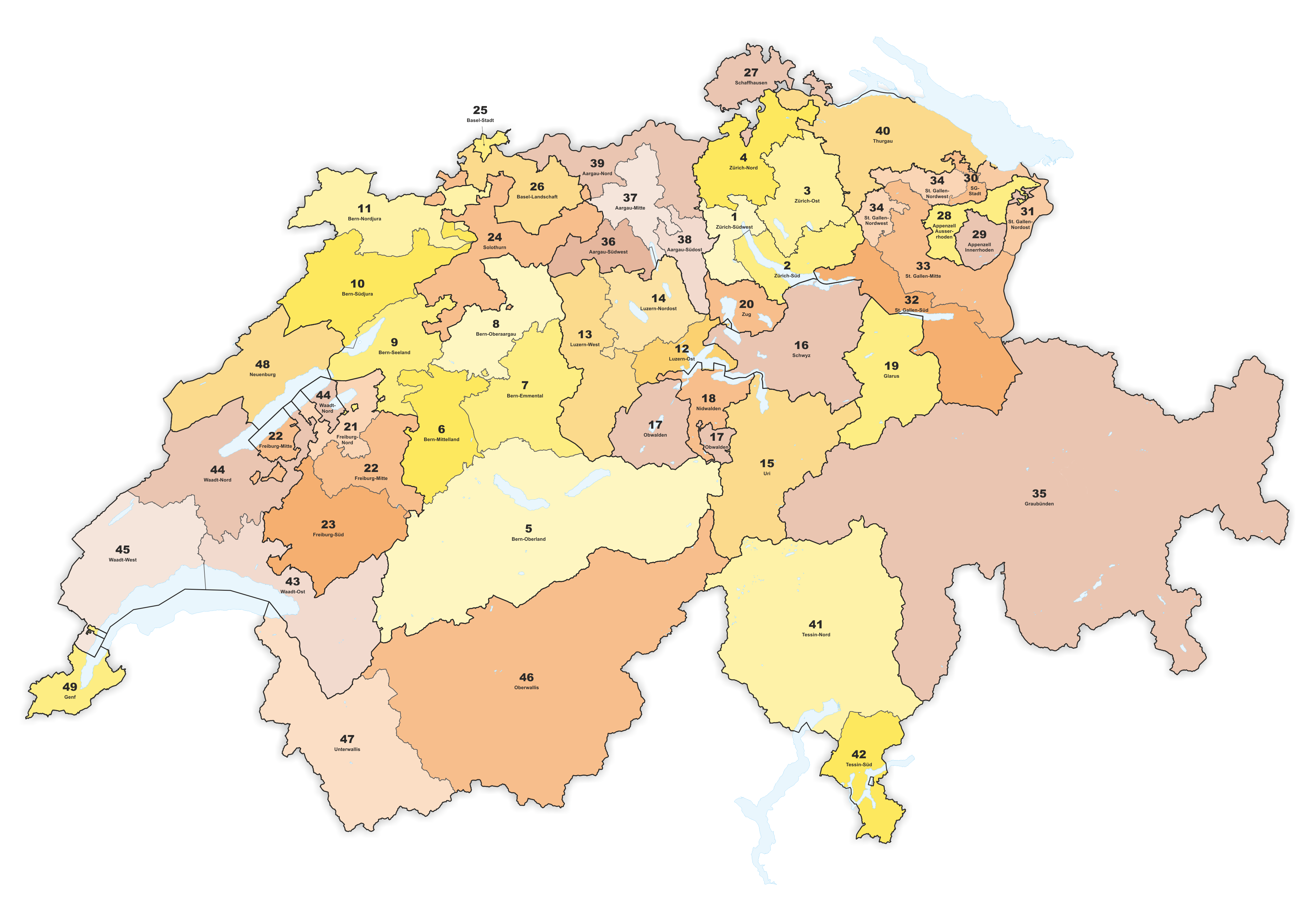
The 49 electoral districts

Federal elections were held in Switzerland on 29 October 1905. The Free Democratic Party retained its majority in the National Council.

== Electoral system ==
The 167 members of the National Council were elected in 49 single- and multi-member constituencies using a three-round system. Candidates had to receive a majority in the first or second round to be elected; if it went to a third round, only a plurality was required. Voters could cast as many votes as there were seats in their constituency. There was one seat for every 20,000 citizens, with seats allocated to cantons in proportion to their population.

== Results ==
Voter turnout was highest in Schaffhausen (where voting was compulsory) at 96% and lowest in Zug at 20%.

Party	Votes	%	Seats	+/–
Free Democratic Party	202,605	49.25	104	+4
Catholic People's Party	92,600	22.51	35	0
Social Democratic Party	60,308	14.66	2	–5
Liberal Centre	27,643	6.72	19	–1
Democratic Group	18,028	4.38	6	+2
Bern People's Party	10,235	2.49	1	0
Others	10,235	2.49	0	0
Total	411,419	100.00	167	0
Valid votes	411,419	93.42		
Invalid/blank votes	28,964	6.58		
Total votes	440,383	100.00		
Registered voters/turnout	779,835	56.47		
Source: Mackie & Rose, BFS (seats)

=== By constituency ===
Constituency	Seats	Party	Seats won	Elected members
Zürich 1	9	Free Democratic Party	9	Emil Zürcher; Alfred Frey; Albert Studler; Walter Bissegger; Johann Jakob Amsler; Ulrich Meister jr.; Friedrich Fritschi; Jakob Lutz; Theodor Frey
Zürich 2	5	Free Democratic Party	3	Johann Rudolf Amsler; Heinrich Hess; Samuel Wanner
Zürich 2	5	Liberal Centre	2	Johann Jakob Abegg; Heinrich Berchtold
Zürich 3	5	Free Democratic Party	5	Rudolf Geilinger; Emil Stadler sr.; Albert Kündig; Eduard Sulzer; Friedrich Ottiker
Zürich 4	3	Free Democratic Party	2	Johann Konrad Hörni; Jakob Walder
Zürich 4	3	Democratic Group	1	David Ringger
Bern 5	5	Free Democratic Party	5	Emil Lohner; Arnold Gottlieb Bühler; Johann Jakob Rebmann; Johann Friedrich Michel; Johannes Ritschard
Bern 6	6	Free Democratic Party	4	Johann Hirter; Johann Jenny; Friedrich Bürgi; Eugen Huber
Bern 6	6	Liberal Centre	2	Edmund von Steiger; Ernst Wyss
Bern 7	4	Free Democratic Party	4	Fritz Zumstein; Fritz Bühlmann; Johann Jakob Schär; Adolf Müller
Bern 8	4	Free Democratic Party	3	Arnold Gugelmann; Michael Hofer; Friedrich Buri
Bern 8	4	Bern People's Party	1	Ulrich Dürrenmatt
Bern 9	4	Free Democratic Party	4	Eduard Bähler; Jakob Freiburghaus; Johannes Zimmermann; Eduard Will
Bern 10	3	Free Democratic Party	3	Virgile Rossel; Albert Gobat; Albert Locher
Bern 11	3	Catholic Right	2	Joseph Choquard; Ernest Daucourt
Bern 11	3	Free Democratic Party	1	Henri Simonin
Lucerne 12	3	Free Democratic Party	3	Peter Knüsel; Hermann Heller; Franz Bucher
Lucerne 13	2	Catholic Right	3	Theodor Schmid; Candid Hochstrasser
Lucerne 14	2	Catholic Right	2	Dominik Fellmann; Josef Anton Schobinger
Uri 15	1	Catholic Right	1	Gustav Muheim
Schwyz 16	3	Catholic Right	2	Josef Anton Ferdinand Büeler; Vital Schwander Sr.
Schwyz 16	3	Free Democratic Party	1	Kaspar Knobel
Obwalden 17	1	Catholic Right	1	Peter Anton Ming
Nidwalden 18	1	Catholic Right	1	Karl Niederberger
Glarus 19	2	Democratic Group	2	Eduard Blumer; David Legler
Zug 20	1	Free Democratic Party	1	Klemens Iten
Fribourg 21	2	Free Democratic Party	1	Constant Dinichert
Fribourg 21	2	Catholic Right	1	Louis de Diesbach
Fribourg 22	2	Catholic Right	2	Aloys Bossy; Vincent Gottofrey
Fribourg 23	2	Catholic Right	2	Alphonse Théraulaz; Eugène Grand
Solothurn 24	5	Free Democratic Party	4	Jakob Zimmermann; Albert Brosi; Wilhelm Vigier; Eduard Bally
Solothurn 24	5	Catholic Right	1	Franz Josef Hänggi
Basel-Stadt 25	6	Free Democratic Party	3	Johann Emil Müry; Heinrich David; Emil Göttisheim
Basel-Stadt 25	6	Liberal Centre	2	Isaak Iselin-Sarasin; Paul Speiser
Basel-Stadt 25	6	Social Democratic Party	1	Alfred Brüstlein
Basel-Landschaft 26	3	Free Democratic Party	2	Jakob Buser; Johannes Suter
Basel-Landschaft 26	3	Democratic Group	1	Albert Schwander
Schaffhausen 27	2	Free Democratic Party	2	Robert Grieshaber; Carl Spahn
Appenzell Ausserrhoden 28	3	Free Democratic Party	3	Arthur Eugster; Johann Konrad Eisenhut; Hermann Altherr
Appenzell Innerhoden 29	1	Liberal Centre	1	Karl Justin Sonderegger
St. Gallen 30	3	Free Democratic Party	2	Karl Emil Wild; Albert Mächler
St. Gallen 30	3	Democratic Group	1	J. A. Scherrer-Füllemann
St. Gallen 31	3	Catholic Right	2	Johann Gebhard Lutz; Carl Zurburg
St. Gallen 31	3	Social Democratic Party	1	Heinrich Scherrer
St. Gallen 32	2	Catholic Right	2	Johann Baptist Schubiger; Emil Grünenfelder
St. Gallen 33	3	Free Democratic Party	3	Carl Hilty; Ernst Wagner; Johann Jakob Bösch
St. Gallen 34	2	Catholic Right	2	Othmar Staub; Thomas Holenstein Sr.
Grisons 35	5	Free Democratic Party	3	Johann Anton Caflisch; Eduard Walser; Andrea Vital
Grisons 35	5	Liberal Centre	1	Alfred von Planta
Grisons 35	5	Catholic Right	1	Johann Schmid
Aargau 36	3	Free Democratic Party	3	Arnold Künzli; Johann Rudolf Suter; Jakob Lüthy
Aargau 37	3	Free Democratic Party	3	Hans Müri; Conradin Zschokke; Max Alphonse Erismann
Aargau 38	1	Catholic Right	1	Jakob Nietlispach
Aargau 39	3	Liberal Centre	1	Emil Albert Baldinger
Aargau 39	3	Catholic Right	1	Franz Xaver Eggspühler
Aargau 39	3	Free Democratic Party	1	Friedrich Brunner
Thurgau 40	6	Free Democratic Party	4	Carl Eigenmann; Heinrich Häberlin; Adolf Germann; Jakob Müller
Thurgau 40	6	Democratic Group	1	Emil Hofmann
Thurgau 40	6	Catholic Right	1	Alfons von Streng
Ticino 41	4	Free Democratic Party	3	Achille Borella; Romeo Manzoni; Emilio Censi
Ticino 41	4	Catholic Right	1	Giovanni Lurati
Ticino 42	3	Free Democratic Party	2	Alfredo Pioda; Giuseppe Stoffel
Ticino 42	3	Catholic Right	1	Giuseppe Motta
Vaud 43	7	Free Democratic Party	4	Charles-Eugène Fonjallaz; Isaac Oyex; Alphonse Dubuis; Émile Gaudard
Vaud 43	7	Liberal Centre	3	Alois de Meuron; Émile Vuichoud; Édouard Secretan
Vaud 44	4	Free Democratic Party	4	Camille Decoppet; Ernest Rubattel; Jules Roulet; Jean Cavat
Vaud 45	3	Free Democratic Party	2	Juste Lagier; Adrien Thélin
Vaud 45	3	Liberal Centre	1	Louis-Charles Delarageaz
Valais 46	4	Catholic Right	4	Alexander Seiler; Joseph Kuntschen Sr.; Gustav Loretan; Raymond Evéquoz
Valais 47	2	Catholic Right	1	Maurice Pellissier
Valais 47	2	Free Democratic Party	1	Camille Défayes
Neuchâtel 48	6	Free Democratic Party	5	Louis-Alexandre Martin; Paul-Ernest Mosimann; Louis Perrier; Jules-Albert Piguet; Henri Calame
Neuchâtel 48	6	Liberal Centre	1	Jules Calame
Geneva 49	7	Liberal Centre	4	Gustave Ador; Édouard Odier; Jacques Rutty; Marc-Joseph Bonnet
Geneva 49	7	Free Democratic Party	2	Alfred Vincent; Henri Fazy
Geneva 49	7	Catholic Right	1	Théodore Fontana
Source: Gruner
