= 1887 Swiss federal election =

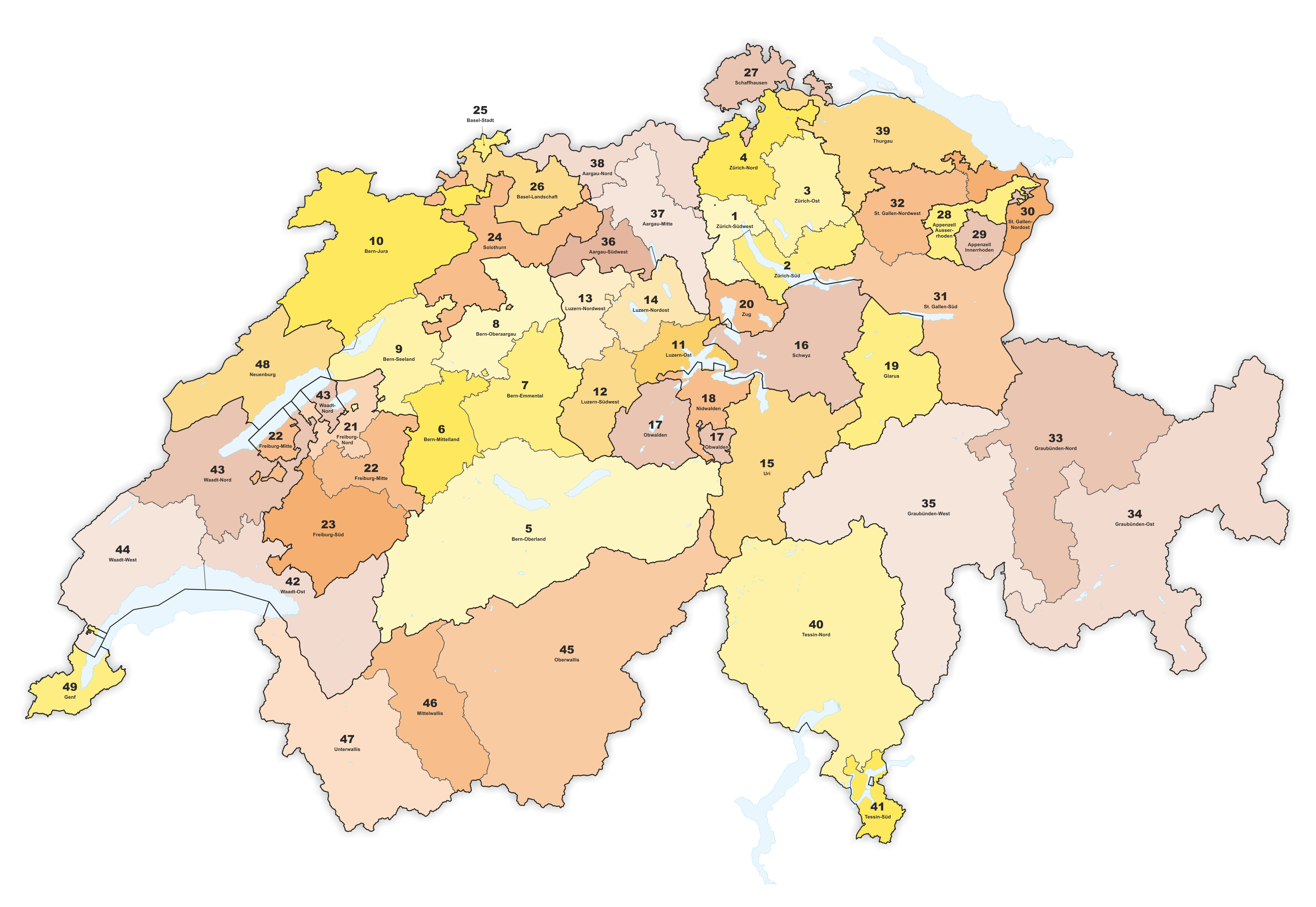
The 49 electoral districts

Federal elections were held in Switzerland on 30 October 1887. The Radical Left narrowly retained its majority in the National Council.

== Electoral system ==
The 145 members of the National Council were elected in 49 single- and multi-member constituencies using a three-round system. Candidates had to receive a majority in the first or second round to be elected; if it went to a third round, only a plurality was required. Voters could cast as many votes as there were seats in their constituency. There was one seat for every 20,000 citizens, with seats allocated to cantons in proportion to their population.

== Results ==
Voter turnout was highest in Schaffhausen (where voting was compulsory) at 95.5% and lowest in Zug at 18.5%.

| Party | Votes | % | Seats | +/– |
|---|---|---|---|---|
| Radical Left | | 40.2 | 73 | –1 |
| Catholic Right | | 28.3 | 35 | –2 |
| Liberal Centre | | 15.9 | 19 | +1 |
| Democratic Group | | 9.4 | 14 | –1 |
| Evangelical Right | | 3.4 | 4 | +3 |
| Socialists | | 1.3 | 0 | 0 |
| Independents | | 1.5 | 0 | 0 |
| Total | | | 145 | 0 |
| Total votes | 359,317 | – | | |
| Registered voters/turnout | 649,229 | 55.35 | | |
Source: BFS (seats)

=== By constituency ===
| Constituency | Seats | Party | Seats won | Elected members |
|---|---|---|---|---|
| Zürich 1 | 5 | Liberal Centre | 3 | Konrad Cramer; Ulrich Meister Jr.; Wilhelm Hertenstein |
| Zürich 1 | 5 | Democratic Group | 2 | Arnold Syfrig; Johann Jakob Schäppi |
| Zürich 2 | 4 | Liberal Centre | 3 | Johann Heinrich Bühler; Heinrich Landis; Johann Jakob Abegg |
| Zürich 2 | 4 | Democratic Group | 1 | Johann Jakob Keller |
| Zürich 3 | 4 | Democratic Group | 4 | Rudolf Geilinger; Johannes Stössel; Ludwig Forrer; Friedrich Salomon Vögelin |
| Zürich 4 | 3 | Democratic Group | 3 | Friedrich Scheuchzer; Johannes Moser; Johann Jakob Sulzer |
| Bern 5 | 5 | Radical Left | 5 | Matthäus Zurbuchen; Johann Jakob Rebmann; Jakob Scherz; Johann Zürcher; Carl Samuel Zyro |
| Bern 6 | 5 | Radical Left | 5 | Johann Jakob Hauser; Karl Stämpfli; Rudolf Rohr; Rudolf Brunner; Eduard Müller |
| Bern 7 | 4 | Radical Left | 4 | Fritz Bühlmann; Karl Schenk; Gottlieb Riem; Gottlieb Berger |
| Bern 8 | 4 | Bern People's Party | 3 | Johannes Schär; Emil Elsässer; Ulrich Burkhalter |
| Bern 8 | 4 | Radical Left | 1 | Johann Friedrich Gugelmann |
| Bern 9 | 4 | Radical Left | 4 | Eduard Bähler; Eduard Marti; Johannes Zimmermann; Rudolf Häni |
| Bern 10 | 5 | Radical Left | 5 | Ernest Francillon; Henri Cuenat; Pierre Jolissaint; Joseph Stockmar; Auguste-Adolphe Klaye |
| Lucerne 11 | 2 | Radical Left | 2 | Josef Vonmatt; Friedrich Wüest |
| Lucerne 12 | 1 | Catholic Right | 1 | Josef Zemp |
| Lucerne 13 | 2 | Catholic Right | 2 | Candid Hochstrasser; Josef Erni |
| Lucerne 14 | 2 | Catholic Right | 2 | Philipp Anton von Segesser; Franz Xaver Beck |
| Uri 15 | 1 | Catholic Right | 1 | Josef Arnold |
| Schwyz 16 | 3 | Catholic Right | 3 | Vital Schwander Sr.; Fridolin Holdener; Nikolaus Benziger |
| Obwalden 17 | 1 | Catholic Right | 1 | Nicolaus Hermann |
| Nidwalden 18 | 1 | Catholic Right | 1 | Robert Durrer |
| Glarus 19 | 2 | Democratic Group | 1 | Kaspar Schindler |
| Glarus 19 | 2 | Liberal Centre | 1 | Rudolf Gallati |
| Zug 20 | 1 | Catholic Right | 1 | Alois Müller |
| Fribourg 21 | 2 | Catholic Right | 1 | Georges Python |
| Fribourg 21 | 2 | Liberal Centre | | Georges Cressier |
| Fribourg 22 | 2 | Catholic Right | 2 | Paul Aeby; Louis de Wuilleret |
| Fribourg 23 | 2 | Catholic Right | 2 | Louis Grand; Alphonse Théraulaz |
| Solothurn 24 | 4 | Radical Left | 3 | Joseph Gisi; Wilhelm Vigier; Albert Brosi |
| Solothurn 24 | 4 | Liberal Centre | 1 | Bernard Hammer |
| Basel-Stadt 25 | 3 | Radical Left | 3 | Karl Burckhardt-Iselin; Eduard Eckenstein; Ernst Brenner |
| Basel-Landschaft 26 | 3 | Radical Left | 3 | Ambrosius Rosenmund; Johann Jakob Stutz; Gédéon Thommen |
| Schaffhausen 27 | 2 | Democratic Group | 1 | Wilhelm Joos |
| Schaffhausen 27 | 2 | Radical Left | 1 | Robert Grieshaber |
| Appenzell Ausserrhoden 28 | 3 | Liberal Centre | 1 | Johann Jakob Sturzenegger; Johann Ulrich Eisenhut |
| Appenzell Ausserrhoden 28 | 3 | Radical Left | 1 | Johann Conrad Sonderegger |
| Appenzell Innerhoden 29 | 1 | Liberal Centre | 1 | Karl Justin Sonderegger |
| St. Gallen 30 | 4 | Democratic Group | 2 | Roderich Albert Kunkler; Adolf Grubenmann |
| St. Gallen 30 | 4 | Catholic Right | 1 | Johann Gebhard Lutz |
| St. Gallen 30 | 4 | Evangelical Right | 1 | Christoph Tobler |
| St. Gallen 31 | 3 | Catholic Right | 1 | Wilhelm Good |
| St. Gallen 31 | 3 | Radical Left | 1 | Gallus August Suter |
| St. Gallen 31 | 3 | Democratic Group | 1 | Carl Theodor Curti |
| St. Gallen 32 | 3 | Catholic Right | 3 | Johann Fridolin Müller; Johann Joseph Keel; Laurenz Schönenberger |
| Grisons 33 | 2 | Liberal Centre | 1 | Peter Theophil Bühler |
| Grisons 33 | 2 | Radical Left | 1 | Luzius Raschein |
| Grisons 34 | 2 | Catholic Right | 2 | Caspar Decurtins; Johann Schmid |
| Grisons 35 | 1 | Radical Left | 1 | Andrea Bezzola |
| Aargau 36 | 3 | Radical Left | 3 | Arnold Künzli; Erwin Kurz; Ludwig Karrer |
| Aargau 37 | 4 | Liberal Centre | 3 | Max Alphonse Erismann; Johann Rohr; Peter Emil Isler |
| Aargau 37 | 4 | Radical Left | 1 | Hans Riniker |
| Aargau 38 | 3 | Catholic Right | 2 | Emil Albert Baldinger; Arnold Münch |
| Aargau 38 | 3 | Liberal Centre | 1 | Emil Welti |
| Thurgau 39 | 5 | Radical Left | 4 | Friedrich Heinrich Häberlin; Johann Philipp Heitz; Gustav Merkle; Johann Jakob Schümperlin |
| Thurgau 39 | 5 | Liberal Centre | 1 | Jakob Huldreich Bachmann |
| Ticino 40 | 2 | Radical Left | 2 | Costantino Bernasconi; Leone de Stoppani |
| Ticino 41 | 5 | Catholic Right | 5 | Filippo Bonzanigo; Martino Pedrazzini; Giovanni Dazzoni; Ignazio Polar; Agostino Gatti |
| Vaud 42 | 5 | Radical Left | 5 | Louis Ruchonnet; Louis Chausson; Charles-Eugène Fonjallaz; Eugène Ruffy; Louis Paschoud |
| Vaud 43 | 4 | Radical Left | 4 | Jacques-François Viquerat; Louis Déglon; Jean Cavat; Ami Campiche |
| Vaud 44 | 3 | Radical Left | 3 | Adrien Thélin; Jules Colomb; Charles Baud |
| Valais 45 | 2 | Catholic Right | 2 | Hans Anton von Roten; Victor de Chastonay |
| Valais 46 | 1 | Catholic Right | 1 | Joseph Favre |
| Valais 47 | 2 | Radical Left | 1 | Émile Gaillard |
| Valais 47 | 2 | Liberal Centre | 1 | Maurice Chappelet |
| Neuchâtel 48 | 5 | Radical Left | 5 | Numa Droz; Robert Comtesse; Henri Morel; Arnold Grosjean; Charles-Émile Tissot |
| Geneva 49 | 5 | Radical Left | 3 | Adrien Lachenal; Georges Favon; Antoine Carteret |
| Geneva 49 | 5 | Liberal Centre | 2 | Ernest Pictet; Jean-Étienne Dufour |
Source: Gruner
