= 1911 Swiss federal election =

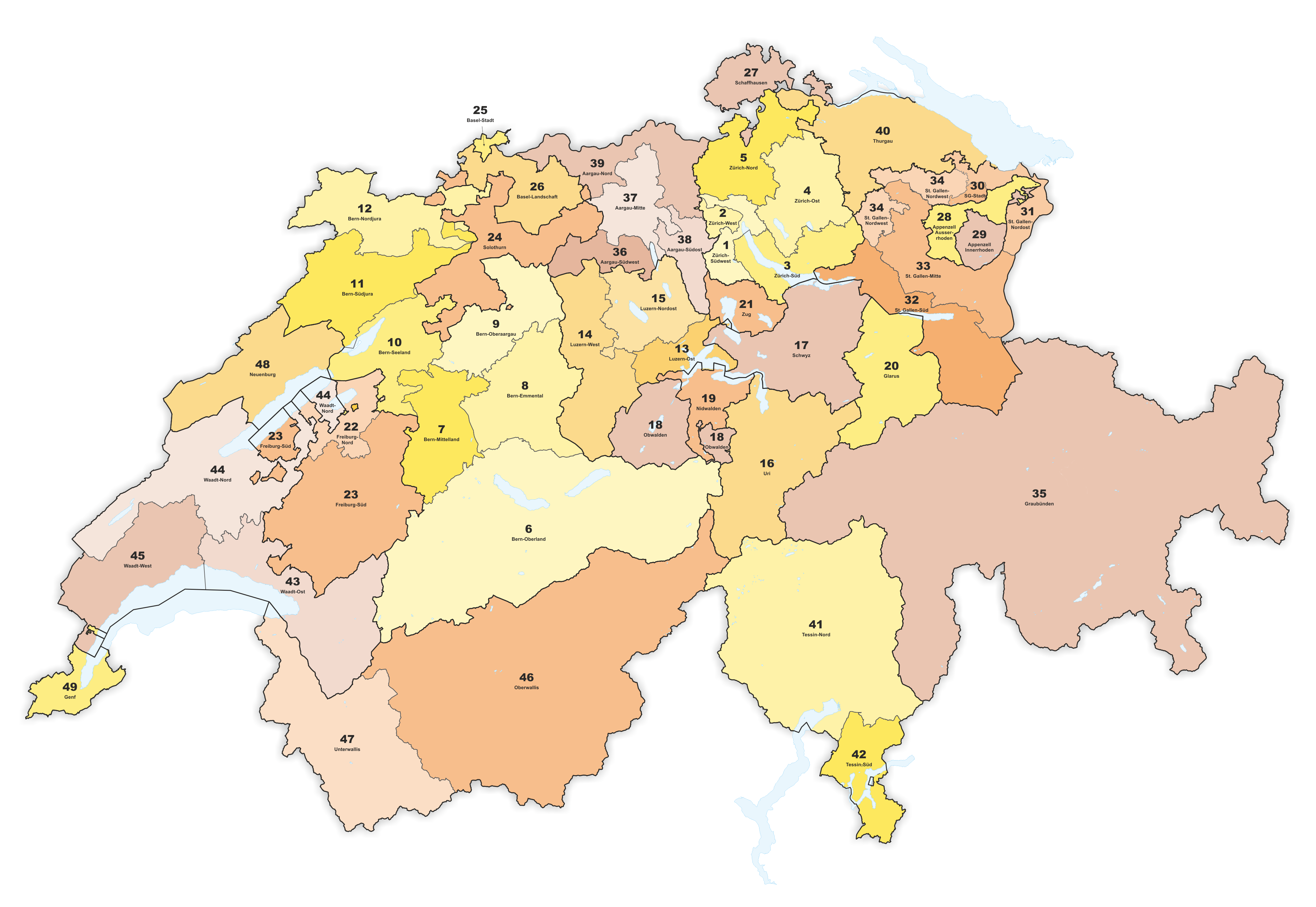
The 49 electoral districts

Federal elections were held in Switzerland on 29 October 1911. The Free Democratic Party retained its majority in the National Council.

== Electoral system ==
The 189 members of the National Council were elected in 49 single- and multi-member constituencies using a three-round system. Candidates had to receive a majority in the first or second round to be elected; if it went to a third round, only a plurality was required. Voters could cast as many votes as there were seats in their constituency. There was one seat for every 20,000 citizens, with seats allocated to cantons in proportion to their population.

The elections were held under the new Federal law concerning the constituencies for the election of National Council members of passed on 23 June 1911. Following the 1910 census the number of seats was increased from 167 to 189, although the number of constituencies remained the same. Bern and Zürich both gained three seats, Aargau, St. Gallen and Vaud gained two, whilst, Basel-Landschaft, Basel-Stadt, Fribourg, Geneva, Graubünden, Lucerne, Neuchâtel, Solothurn, Ticino and Thurgau all gained one. A referendum on introducing proportional representation had been held in October 1910, and although it was approved by a majority of cantons, it was narrowly rejected by voters.

== Results ==
Voter turnout was highest in Aargau at 83.1% (higher than the 80% in Schaffhausen, where voting was compulsory) and lowest in Obwalden at 21.1%.

Party	Votes	%	Seats	+/–
Free Democratic Party	198,300	49.47	115	+10
Social Democratic Party	80,050	19.97	15	+8
Catholic People's Party	76,726	19.14	38	+4
Liberal Centre	27,062	6.75	14	–2
Democratic Group	12,610	3.15	6	+1
Circle of Rhine Party	6,122	1.53	1	New
Others	6,122	1.53	0	0
Total	400,870	100.00	189	+22
Valid votes	400,870	91.58		
Invalid/blank votes	36,840	8.42		
Total votes	437,710	100.00		
Registered voters/turnout	830,120	52.73		
Source: Mackie & Rose, BFS (seats)

=== By constituency ===
Constituency	Seats	Party	Seats won	Elected members
Zürich 1	7	Free Democratic Party	7	Robert Billeter; Emil Zürcher; Alfred Frey; Jakob Lutz; Friedrich Fritschi; Walter Bissegger; Johann Jakob Hauser
Zürich 2	5	Social Democratic Party	5	Herman Greulich; Paul Pflüger; Robert Seidel; Johannes Sigg; Robert Grimm
Zürich 3	5	Free Democratic Party	3	Werner Weber; Heinrich Hess; Karl August Koller
Zürich 3	5	Liberal Centre	2	Johann Jakob Abegg; Johann Rudolf Amsler
Zürich 4	5	Free Democratic Party	4	Hans Sträuli; Friedrich Ottiker; Eduard Sulzer; Julius Guyer
Zürich 4	5	Social Democratic Party	1	Friedrich Studer
Zürich 5	3	Free Democratic Party	3	Johann Konrad Hörni; Jakob Walder; David Ringger
Bern 6	6	Free Democratic Party	6	Robert Stucki; Emil Lohner; Arnold Gottlieb Bühler; Johann Jakob Rebmann; Johann Friedrich Michel; Hermann Schüpbach
Bern 7	7	Free Democratic Party	4	Johann Hirter; Johann Jenny; Eugen Huber; Jakob Scheidegger
Bern 7	7	Liberal Centre	2	Gustav König; Ernst Wyss
Bern 7	7	Social Democratic Party	1	Gustav Müller
Bern 8	4	Free Democratic Party	4	Fritz Bühlmann; Johann Jakob Schär; Fritz Zumstein; Friedrich Minder
Bern 9	4	Free Democratic Party	3	Arnold Gugelmann; Michael Hofer; Friedrich Buri
Bern 9	4	Social Democratic Party	1	August Rikli
Bern 10	5	Free Democratic Party	4	Alfred Moll; Jakob Freiburghaus; Eduard Will; Karl Scheurer
Bern 10	5	Social Democratic Party	1	Johann Näher
Bern 11	3	Free Democratic Party	3	Virgile Rossel; Albert Gobat; Albert Locher
Bern 12	3	Catholic Right	2	Joseph Choquard; Ernest Daucourt
Bern 12	3	Free Democratic Party	1	Henri Simonin
Lucerne 13	3	Free Democratic Party	3	Peter Knüsel; Otto Sidler; Hermann Heller
Lucerne 14	2	Catholic Right	3	Anton Erni; Josef Anton Balmer
Lucerne 15	3	Catholic Right	2	Franz Moser-Schär; Heinrich Walther; Dominik Fellmann
Uri 16	1	Catholic Right	1	Josef Furrer
Schwyz 17	3	Catholic Right	2	Anton von Hettlingen; Josef Anton Ferdinand Büeler
Schwyz 17	3	Free Democratic Party	1	Martin Steinegger
Obwalden 18	1	Catholic Right	1	Peter Anton Ming
Nidwalden 19	1	Catholic Right	1	Karl Niederberger
Glarus 20	2	Democratic Group	2	Eduard Blumer; David Legler
Zug 21	1	Free Democratic Party	1	Hermann Stadlin
Fribourg 22	2	Free Democratic Party	1	Hermann Liechti
Fribourg 22	2	Catholic Right	1	Eugène Descheneaux
Fribourg 23	5	Catholic Right	4	Max de Diesbach; Charles de Wuilleret; Alphonse Théraulaz; Eugène Grand
Fribourg 23	5	Free Democratic Party	1	A.-F.-L. Cailler
Solothurn 24	6	Free Democratic Party	4	Max Studer; Jakob Zimmermann; Adrian von Arx Sr.; Eduard Bally
Solothurn 24	6	Social Democratic Party	1	Hans Affolter
Solothurn 24	6	Catholic Right	1	Siegfried Hartmann
Basel-Stadt 25	7	Free Democratic Party	3	Johann Emil Müry; Christian Rothenberger; Emil Göttisheim
Basel-Stadt 25	7	Social Democratic Party	2	Bernhard Jäggi; Johannes Frei
Basel-Stadt 25	7	Liberal Centre	2	Isaak Iselin-Sarasin; Carl Christoph Burckhardt
Basel-Landschaft 26	4	Free Democratic Party	3	Jakob Buser; Johannes Suter; Hermann Straumann
Basel-Landschaft 26	4	Democratic Group	1	Albert Schwander
Schaffhausen 27	2	Free Democratic Party	2	Carl Spahn; Robert Grieshaber
Appenzell Ausserrhoden 28	3	Free Democratic Party	2	Arthur Eugster; Johannes Eisenhut
Appenzell Ausserrhoden 28	3	Social Democratic Party	1	Howard Eugster
Appenzell Innerhoden 29	1	Catholic Right	1	Adolf Steuble
St. Gallen 30	4	Free Democratic Party	3	Karl Emil Wild; Albert Mächler; Eduard Scherrer
St. Gallen 30	4	Democratic Group	1	J. A. Scherrer-Füllemann
St. Gallen 31	4	Catholic Right	2	Johann Baptist Eisenring; Carl Zurburg
St. Gallen 31	4	Free Democratic Party	1	Ernst Schmidheiny
St. Gallen 31	4	Democratic Group	1	Heinrich Otto Weber
St. Gallen 32	3	Free Democratic Party	3	Ernst Wagner; Gallus Schwendener; Robert Forrer
St. Gallen 33	2	Catholic Right	2	Johann Baptist Schubiger; Emil Grünenfelder
St. Gallen 34	2	Catholic Right	2	Othmar Staub; Thomas Holenstein Sr.
Grisons 35	6	Free Democratic Party	4	Johann Anton Caflisch; Eduard Walser; Andrea Vital; Paul Raschein Sr.
Grisons 35	6	Catholic Right	1	Johann Schmid
Grisons 35	6	Liberal Centre	1	Alfred von Planta
Aargau 36	3	Free Democratic Party	3	Johann Rudolf Suter; Otto Hunziker; Alwin Weber
Aargau 37	4	Free Democratic Party	4	Hans Müri; Conradin Zschokke; Hans Siegrist; Heinrich Eugen Abt
Aargau 38	1	Catholic Right	1	Jakob Nietlispach
Aargau 39	4	Catholic Right	2	Alfred Wyrsch; Franz Xaver Eggspühler
Aargau 39	4	Circle of Rhine Party	1	Josef Jäger
Aargau 39	4	Free Democratic Party	1	Gustav Adolf Ursprung
Thurgau 40	7	Free Democratic Party	5	Heinrich Häberlin; Carl Eigenmann; Adolf Germann; Jakob Müller; Oskar Ullmann
Thurgau 40	7	Catholic Right	1	Alfons von Streng
Thurgau 40	7	Democratic Group	1	Emil Hofmann
Ticino 41	4	Free Democratic Party	3	Romeo Manzoni; Achille Borella; Francesco Vassalli
Ticino 41	4	Catholic Right	1	Giovanni Lurati
Ticino 42	4	Free Democratic Party	2	Giuseppe Stoffel; Evaristo Garbani-Nerini
Ticino 42	4	Liberal Centre	1	Francesco Balli
Ticino 42	4	Catholic Right	1	Giuseppe Motta
Vaud 43	8	Free Democratic Party	5	Alphonse Dubuis; Félix Bonjour; Émile Gaudard; Charles-Eugène Fonjallaz; Paul Maillefer
Vaud 43	8	Liberal Centre	3	Alois de Meuron; Édouard Secretan; Alexandre Emery
Vaud 44	5	Free Democratic Party	4	Camille Decoppet; Ernest Chuard; Ulysse Crisinel; Jean Cavat
Vaud 44	5	Liberal Centre	1	Armand Piguet
Vaud 45	3	Free Democratic Party	3	Henri Thélin; Juste Lagier; Maurice Desplands
Valais 46	4	Catholic Right	4	Alexander Seiler; Joseph Kuntschen Sr.; Raymond Evéquoz; Charles de Preux
Valais 47	2	Catholic Right	1	Maurice Pellissier
Valais 47	2	Free Democratic Party	1	Eugène de Lavallaz
Neuchâtel 48	7	Free Democratic Party	5	Louis Perrier; Paul-Ernest Mosimann; Louis-Alexandre Martin; Jules-Albert Piguet; Henri Calame
Neuchâtel 48	7	Social Democratic Party	1	Charles Naine
Neuchâtel 48	7	Liberal Centre	1	Jules Calame
Geneva 49	8	Free Democratic Party	5	Henri Fazy; Marc-Eugène Ritzchel; Victor-Marc Charbonnet; Marc-Ernest Peter; Jacques-Louis Willemin
Geneva 49	8	Liberal Centre	1	Gustave Ador
Geneva 49	8	Social Democratic Party	1	Jean Sigg
Geneva 49	8	Catholic Right	1	Firmin Ody
Source: Gruner
