= Early modern Switzerland =

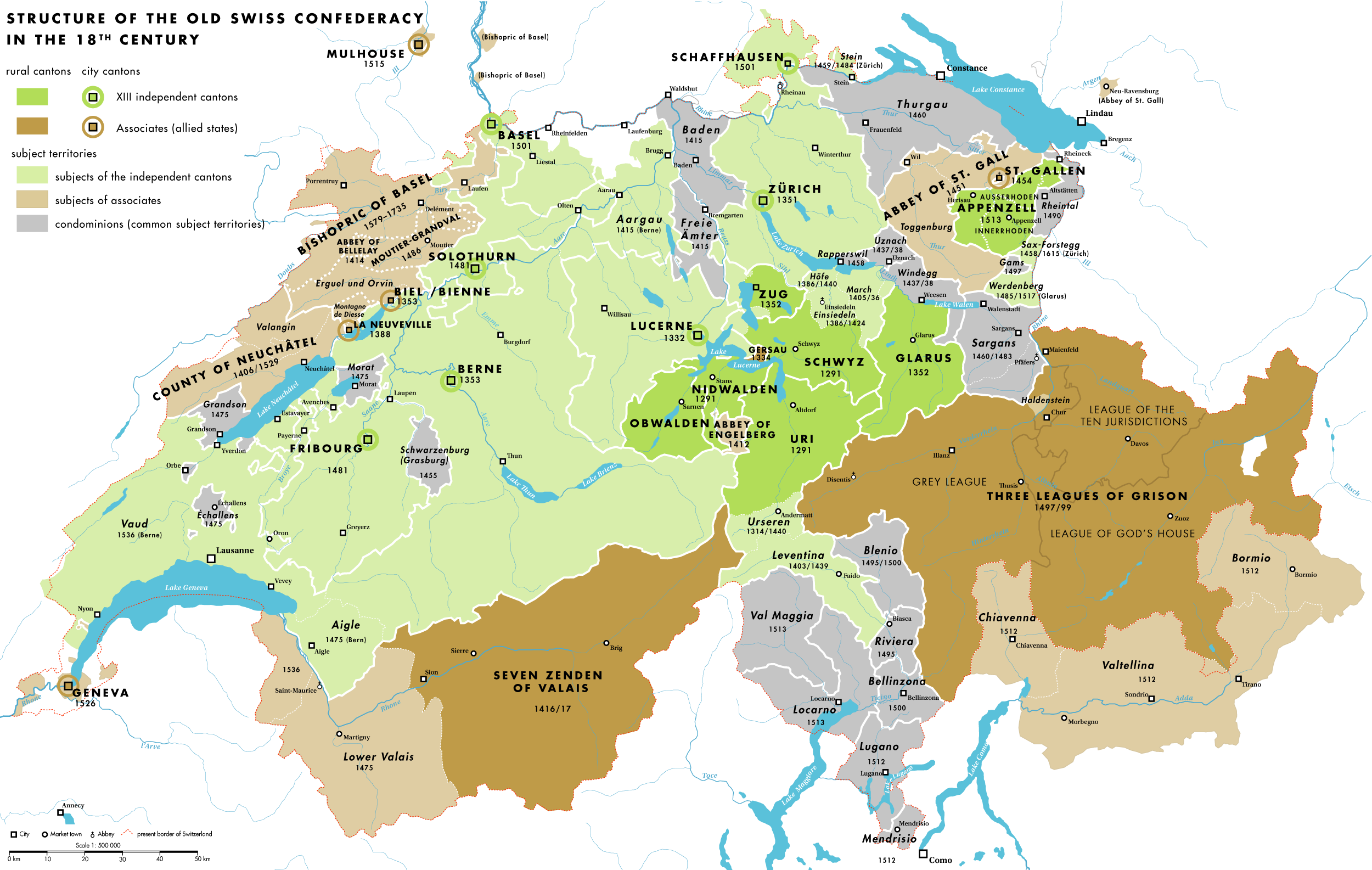
Map of the Swiss Confederacy during the 18th century. Member cantons are shown in green, associates in brown, condominiums in grey.

The early modern history of the Old Swiss Confederacy (Eidgenossenschaft, also known as the "Swiss Republic" or Republica Helvetiorum) and its constituent Thirteen Cantons encompasses the time of the Thirty Years' War (1618–1648) until the French invasion of 1798.

The early modern period was characterized by an increasingly aristocratic and oligarchic ruling class as well as frequent economic or religious revolts. This period came to be referred to as the Ancien Régime retrospectively, in post-Napoleonic Switzerland.

The loosely organized Confederation remained generally disorganized and crippled by the religious divisions created by the Swiss Reformation. During this period the Confederation gained formal independence from the Holy Roman Empire with support from France, and had very close relations with France.

The early modern period also saw the growth of French-Swiss literature, and notable authors of the Age of Enlightenment such as the mathematicians of the Bernoulli family and Leonhard Euler of Basel.

== Thirteen Cantons ==
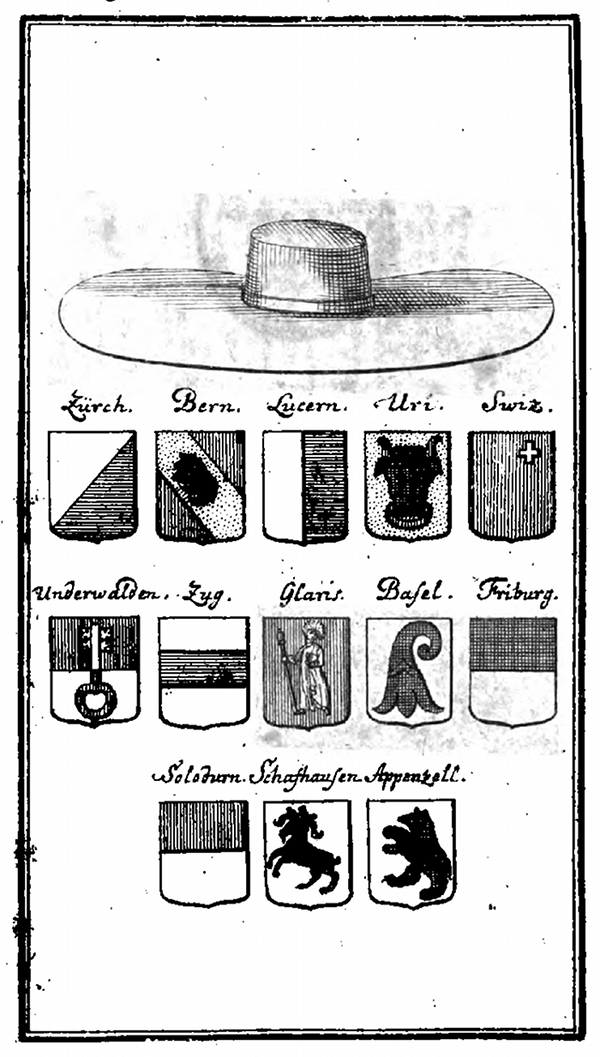
1724 depiction of the thirteen cantonal coats of arms

The Old Swiss Confederacy between phases of expansion consisted of Eight Cantons (German: Acht Orte) during 1352–1481, and of the Thirteen Cantons (German: Dreizehnörtige Eidgenossenschaft) from 1513 until its collapse in 1798.

The Thirteen Cantons thus correspond to the sovereign territories of early modern Switzerland.

They were listed in a fixed order of precedence, first the eight, old cantons of the "Alliance of the Eight Cantons" (German: Bund der Acht Orte) of the 14th century confederacy, then the five cantons which joined after the Burgundian Wars, and within these two groups, the more powerful urban cantons (Städte, "cities") were listed first, with Zürich heading the list as the de facto Vorort of the Eight Cantons prior to the Swiss Reformation. The order of precedence, similar but not identical to the modern order (which lists Zug after Glarus, and Basel after Solothurn), was as follows:

1. Zurich, city canton, since 1351
2. Berne, city canton, since 1353; associate since 1323
3. Lucerne, city canton, since 1332
4. Uri, founding canton (Pact of Brunnen 1315)
5. Schwyz, founding canton (Pact of Brunnen 1315)
6. Unterwalden, founding canton (Pact of Brunnen 1315) (Note: The old coat of arms of Unterwalden was identical with that of Solothurn; the new coat of arms was introduced in the 17th century.)
7. Zug, city canton, since 1352
8. Glarus, rural canton, since 1352
9. Basel, city canton, since 1501
10. Fribourg, city canton, since 1481; associate since 1454
11. Solothurn, city canton, since 1481; associate since 1353 (Note: The coat of arms of Solothurn was identical with that of Unterwalden during the 16th and early 17th centuries, and therefore sometimes shown with inverted colours or asymmetric division of the shield for disambiguation.)
12. Schaffhausen, city canton, since 1501; associate since 1454
13. Appenzell, rural canton, since 1513; associate since 1411

Symbolic depictions of the Confederacy consisted of arrangements of the thirteen cantonal coats of arms, sometimes with an additional symbol of unity, such as two clasping hands, or the "Swiss Bull" or (from the later 17th century), the Three Confederates or the Helvetia allegory.

The cantonal coats of arms were often accompanied by the coats of arms of the close associates of the confederacy, including Biel, the Imperial Abbey of St. Gallen, Imperial City of St. Gallen, the Sieben Zenden (Valais), the Three Leagues (Grisons), the Imperial City of Mulhouse, the Imperial City of Geneva and the Imperial City of Rottweil.

== Thirty Years' War ==
The Reformation in Switzerland left the Old Swiss Confederacy divided between two hostile factions. But still, Switzerland remained a relative "oasis of peace and prosperity" (Grimmelshausen) while Europe was torn by the Thirty Years' War. The cities generally lay low and watched the destruction from afar, the Republic of Zürich investing in building state-of-the-art city ramparts. The cantons had concluded numerous mercenary contracts and defence alliances with partners on all sides. Some of these contracts neutralized each other, which allowed the confederation to remain neutral – in the 1647 Defensionale von Wil, signed under the impression of the Swedes advancing as far as Lake Constance in the winter of 1646/47, the confederates declared "permanent armed neutrality", the historical starting point of Swiss neutrality, which would be re-confirmed by the Congress of Vienna and adhered to throughout the 19th and 20th century conflicts.

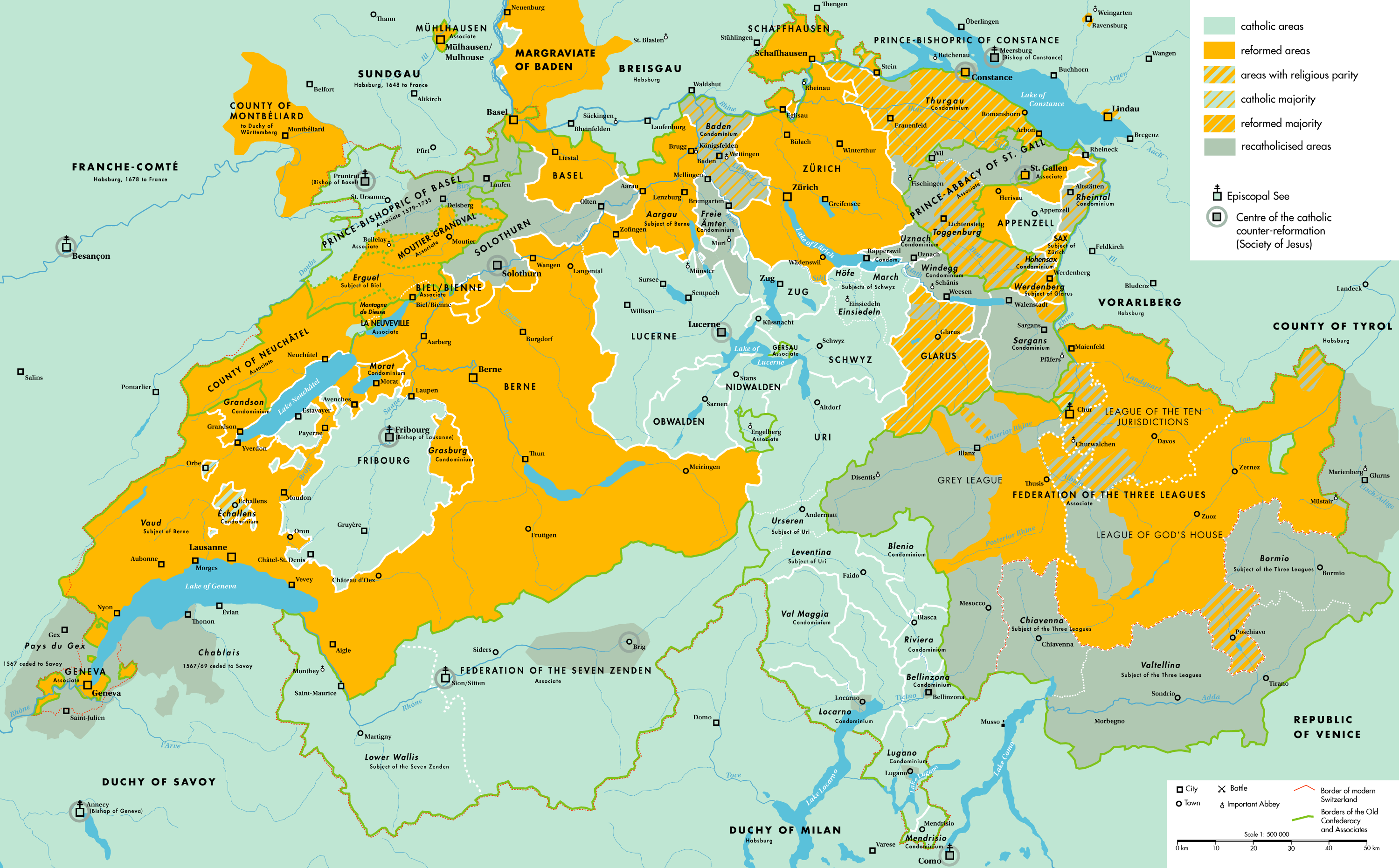
Religious division of the Old Confederacy during the 17th and 18th centuries

== Treaty of Westphalia ==
At the Treaty of Westphalia in 1648, the Swiss Confederacy attained legal independence from the Holy Roman Empire, although it had been de facto independent since the Swabian War in 1499. With the support of the Duke of Orléans, who was also prince of Neuchâtel and the head of the French delegation, Johann Rudolf Wettstein, the mayor of Basel, succeeded in getting a formal exemption from the empire for all cantons and associates of the confederacy.

During the Thirty Years' War, the Drei Bünde (Graubünden, an associate state of the Swiss Confederation) had been caught in the middle of internal and external conflict. Because the Leagues were very decentralized, conflicts over religion and foreign policy broke out during the war (known as the Bündner Wirren or Confusion of the Leagues). Following the war the League took steps to strengthen itself. The Valtellina, which had broken from the Three Leagues, became a dependency once again after the Treaty and remained so until the founding of the Cisalpine Republic by Napoleon Bonaparte in 1797.

== Relationships with France ==
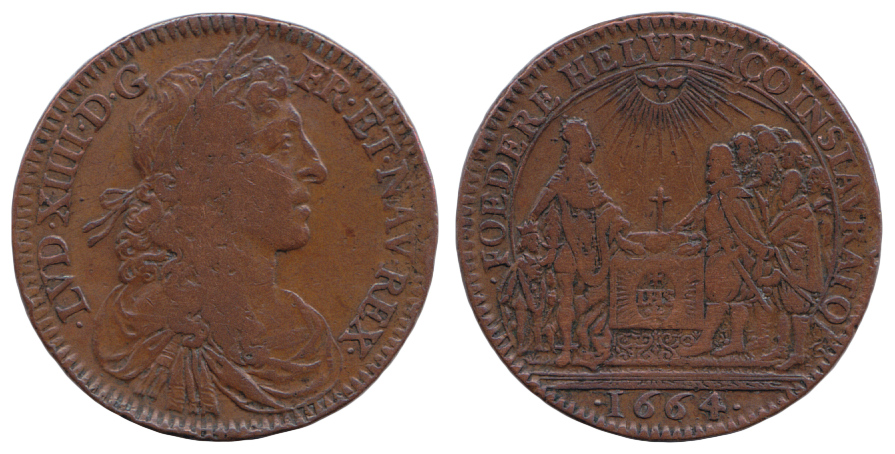
French token commemorating the renewal of the treaty between France and the Swiss Union in 1663

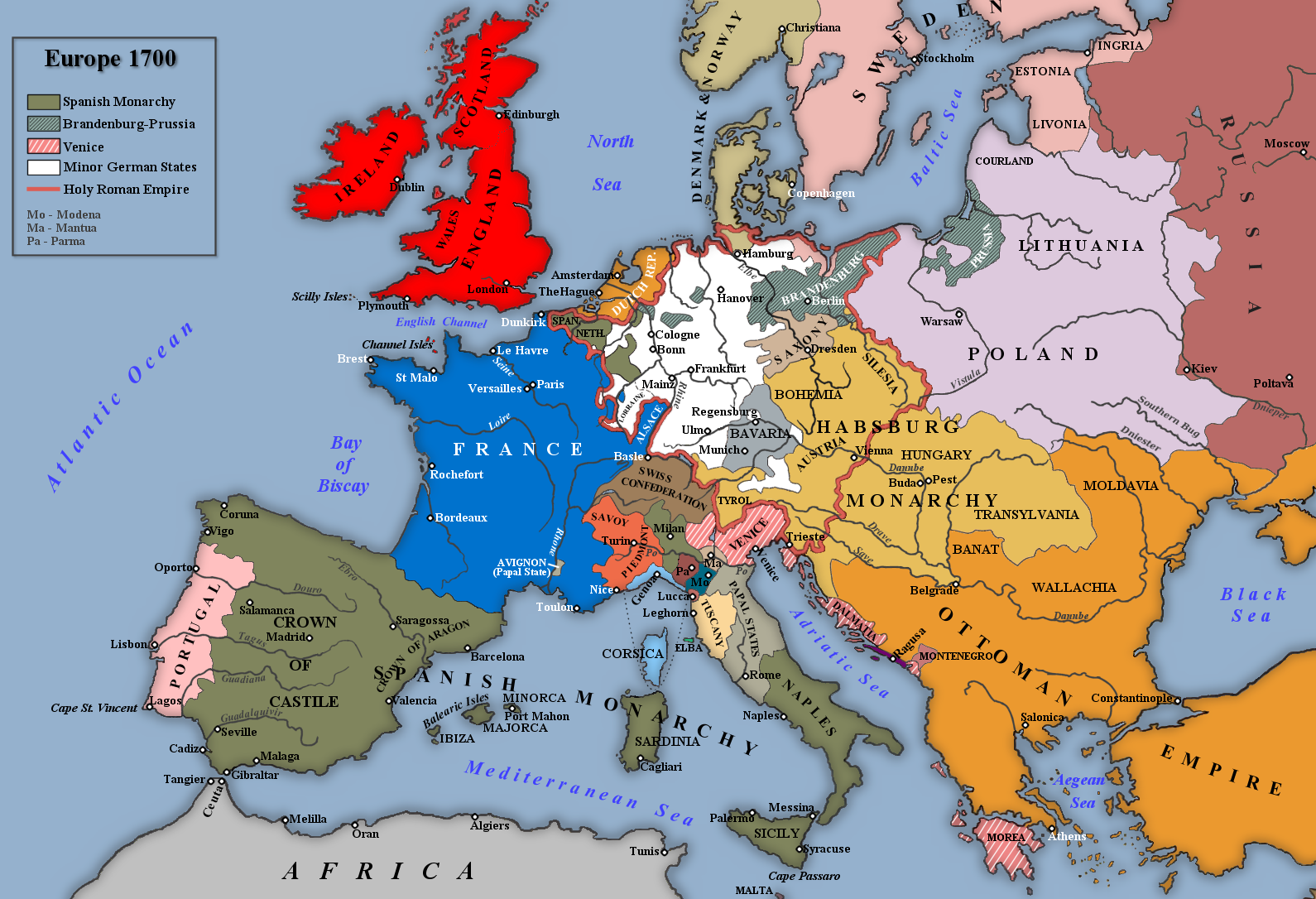
The Confederation, shown within Europe in 1700

Following the Thirty Years' War, as France grew into a great power in Europe, the newly independent Confederation turned to France for trade and protection. In 1663, the Confederation agreed to a new treaty with France which granted Swiss mercenaries certain rights and protections as well as promised French neutrality in Swiss religious conflicts. However, as a consequence of this treaty Switzerland could do nothing when Louis XIV took Alsace (in 1648), Franche-Comté (in 1678 during the Franco-Dutch War) and Strasbourg (in 1681). Following Louis XIV's revocation of the Edict of Nantes, which granted rights to Protestants, the Protestant cantons began to favor military service with the Protestant Dutch who were fighting a series of wars against several European powers including France.

In 1707, following the death of Marie de Nemours, Duchess of Nemours and Princess of Neuchâtel, the city, which was on the border of the Swiss Confederation, had to choose her successor from among fifteen claimants. While Louis XIV promoted a number of French pretenders to the title, the Protestant cantons of the Swiss Confederation encouraged Neuchâtel to select the Protestant King Frederick I of Prussia. In a victory for the Protestant half of the Confederation, Frederick I, who claimed his entitlement in a rather complicated fashion through the Houses of Orange and Nassau, was selected.

In 1715, the Catholic cantons, to regain prestige following their defeat during the Second Battle of Villmergen, renewed the Confederation's treaty with France with several major and unpopular changes. France was placed in the position of the guarantor of their freedom with rights of interfering in case of attack from forces within or without the Confederation. France also promised to procure restitution for the lands lost by the Catholic cantons to the Protestant cantons. This agreement removed much of the independence that the Confederation had enjoyed. In 1777, the unpopular clause was dropped from a renewed agreement between the Confederation and France and the independence of Switzerland was explicitly stated.

== Growth of the aristocracy ==
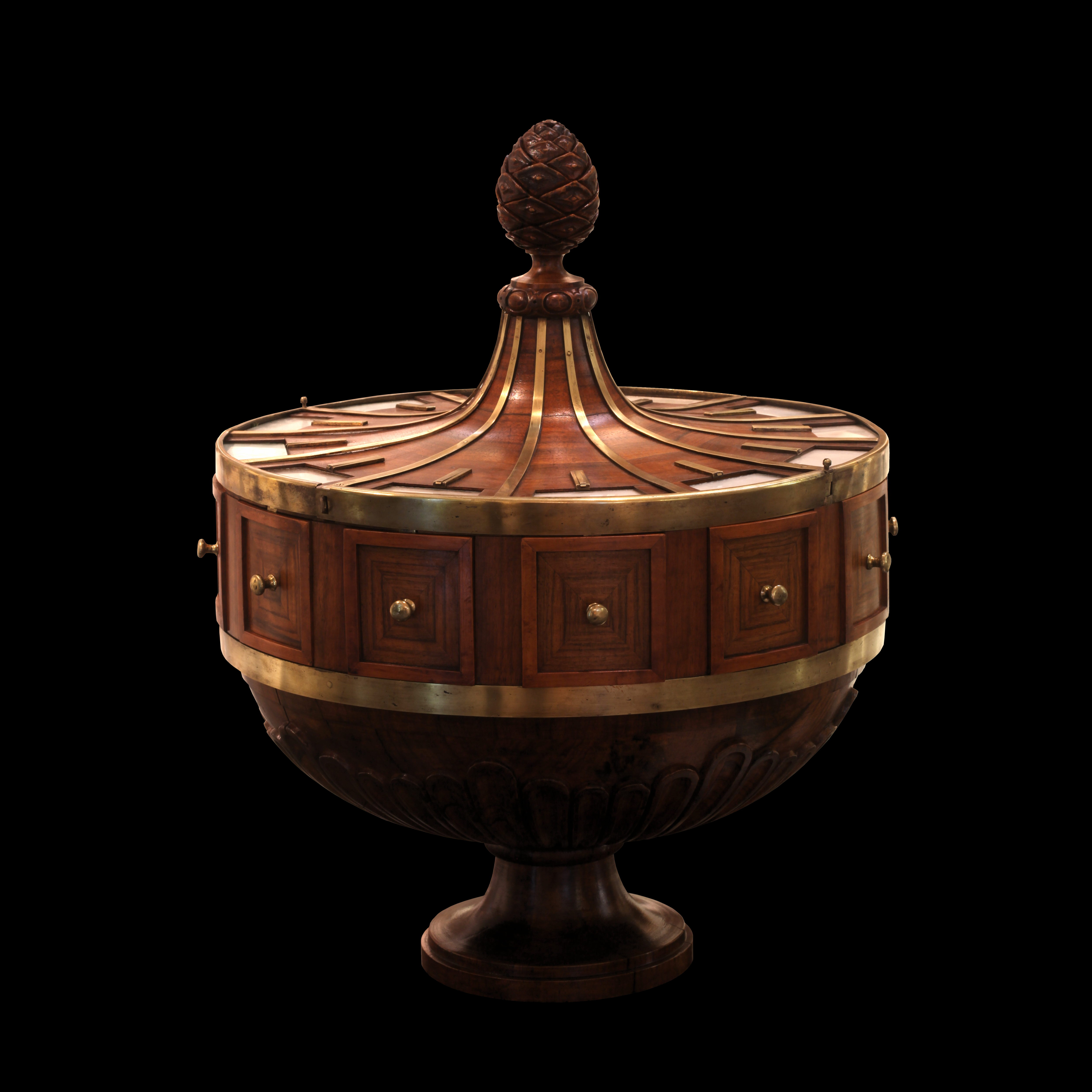
The concentration of wealth among the aristocrats allowed art such as this ballot box from Neuchâtel to be created, Musée d'Art et d'Histoire (Neuchâtel)

Political power congealed around the 13 cantons (Bern, Zürich, Zug, Glarus, Uri, Schwyz, Unterwalden, Fribourg, Solothurn, Basel, Luzern, Schaffhausen, Appenzell) of the old confederation. During this era, the patrician families decreased in number but increased in power. Some patrician families were drawn from leadership in the guilds or trading groups within the town, while other families grew from successful mercenary captains and soldiers. The trend toward increasing authoritarianism conflicted with the history of public expression that grew out of the Swiss Reformation. In many regions the patrician families were unable to suppress the public assemblies, but they did dominate the assemblies. The tradition of inviting the people to express their opinions died out mostly during this era.

During this time, changes to the membership of city councils became increasingly rare. Throughout the Middle Ages a seat on the town council was normally a lifetime appointment. However, plagues, battlefield deaths, and conflicts over the Reformation guaranteed a regular turnover in the city councils. During the early modern era, growing scientific knowledge and relative peace reduced the number of open seats in the cities. At the same time, council members were increasingly able to fill the council with relatives. The population in Europe began to expand again following the Thirty Years' War. This led to population pressure that hadn't been experienced in several generations. For protection and help against the rising number of immigrants and landless peasants, many villages began to draw closer to neighboring towns, eventually coming under the authority of the larger towns.

During the 17th century seats in the councils became increasingly hereditary. There were between 50 and 200 families that controlled all the key political, military, and industrial positions in Switzerland. In Bern out of 360 burgher families only 69 still had any power and could be elected by the end of the 18th century. However, the aristocracy remained generally open, and in some cities new families were accepted if they were successful and rich enough. An unusual example of interstate family relations are the Counts de Salis-Soglio who were naturalized as British subjects in 1743, only to be sent back immediately to Chur by George II of Great Britain as envoys to the Three Leagues (nowadays the canton of Grisons), a country where the family was predominant in the 18th century. They have ever since remained land owners in England and Switzerland, kept both nationalities and continue to commute between both countries to this day.

== Conflict and Revolution ==
During the Ancien Régime the nobility of Switzerland grew in power becoming nearly absolute rulers. Among the population the loss of power, growing taxes, conflicts between rural and urban populations and religious conflicts all lead to uprisings and conflicts throughout the Confederation.

During the Thirty Years' War, the Swiss Confederacy had been spared from all belligerent action. This allowed the Swiss economy to flourish as war ravaged neighbors bought food and equipment from the Confederacy. However, following the end of the war the German economy recovered and demand for Swiss exports dropped. Many Swiss peasants, who had raised mortgages during the boom at wartime, suddenly faced financial problems.

For cities the war had brought both prosperity and new expenses. The cities required new defenses such as new bastions. During the war France and Spain had paid Pensions, the agreed sums in return for the cantons providing them with mercenary regiments. With the end of the war this money had to be replaced. Taxes were raised and new ones were created. Additionally, less valuable copper coins called Batzen were minted. The Batzen had, however, the same face value as the previously minted silver money. The population began hoarding the silver coins, and the cheap copper money that remained in circulation continually lost its purchasing power. At the end of the war, the population thus faced both a postwar depression and a high inflation, combined with high taxes. This financial crisis led to a series of tax revolts in several cantons of the Confederacy, for instance 1629–36 in Lucerne, 1641 in Bern, or 1645/46 in Zürich. The uprising in 1653 continued this series, but would take the conflict to an unprecedented level.

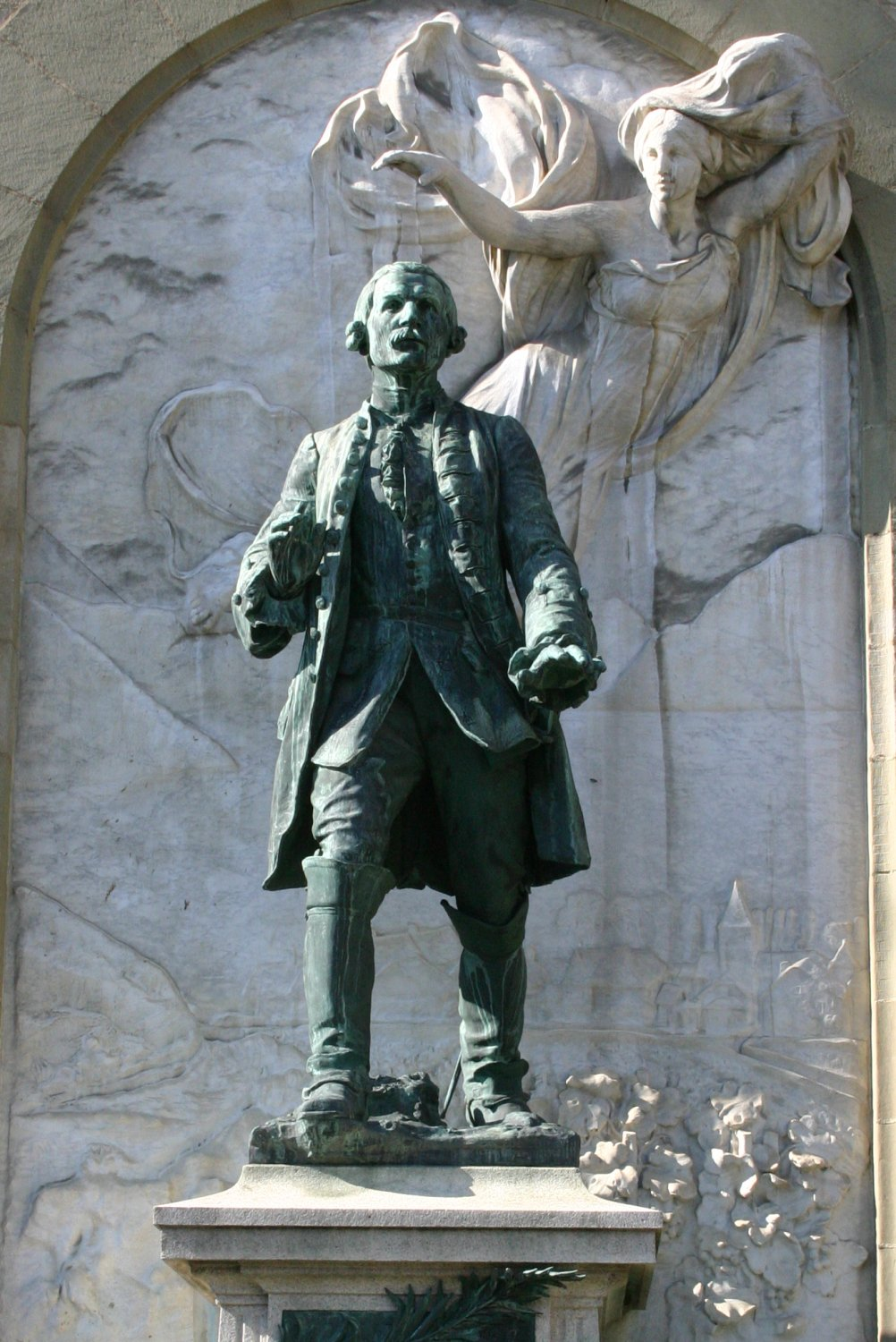
Statue of Major Davel in front of the Château Saint-Maire in Lausanne

In 1653, the largest uprising occurred as peasants of territories subject to Lucerne, Bern, Solothurn and Basel revolted because of currency devaluation. Although the authorities prevailed in this Swiss peasant war, they did pass some tax reforms and the incident in the long term prevented creation of an absolutist state, unlike many of the other states of Europe. The Confederation remained a decentralised and disorganised country during this era, torn by religious and political conflicts. In 1655, an attempt to create a central administration fell apart after the two proposers, Bern and Zürich, couldn't agree with each other.

In 1656, a conflict over religious refugees from Schwyz who had fled to Zürich erupted in the First War of Villmergen. The Catholics were victorious and able to maintain their political dominance, and a treaty agreement that each canton would be totally independent with respect to religious matters. Around 1707 unrest erupted in the city of Geneva which continued throughout the early modern period. Additionally in 1707, the Toggenburg valley rebelled against the Prince-Abbot of St. Gall. Attempts by the Abbot to suppress the valley led to the Second Battle of Villmergen in 1712 and the sacking of the Abbey of St. Gall by Bernese and Zürich troops. From 1719 to 1722 the Werdenberg region rebelled against the city of Glarus.

In 1717, Major Jean Daniel Abraham Davel was appointed the commander of the Lavaux region, which is in modern-day Canton Vaud. He identified with the French-speaking population that felt oppressed by the German-speaking city of Bern that occupied Vaud. Davel believed that he had been called by God to free the inhabitants of Vaud from Bern. On 31 March 1723 he mobilised 600 men and marched on Lausanne to ask the city leaders to revolt with him. However, they reported him to Bern and arrested him on the next morning. He was judged guilty of treason and beheaded.

About a quarter century later, in 1749, there was another unsuccessful uprising in Bern against the patrician families of the city. A few years later, in 1755, the unsuccessful Liviner Uprising against Uri. Finally in 1781 the Chenaux Uprising occurred against the city of Fribourg.

== Age of Enlightenment ==
The Age of Enlightenment was well received in Swiss cities, in spite of contemporary tendencies towards political conservatism. The early modern period was a time when Swiss science and literature flowered. In Zürich the scholar and physician Johann Jakob Scheuchzer wrote about Swiss history, geology, geography and science. In Basel the Bernoulli family and Leonhard Euler worked on mathematics and physics, coming up with some fundamental concepts in these fields. Albrecht von Haller and Jean-Jacques Rousseau praised the natural beauty and unspoiled state of Switzerland and triggered an early wave of tourism (notably, Goethe's visit to Switzerland in 1775).

Zürich at the time was home to a number of internationally known scholars, such as Johann Jakob Bodmer, Salomon Gessner, Johann Heinrich Pestalozzi and Johann Caspar Lavater, styling itself as "Republic" (after the great city states of the time, such as the Republic of Venice).

== Culture during the early modern period ==
Before the early modern period most of the literature of the Swiss Confederation was either in Latin or German as until 1798 the confederation was overwhelmingly German with only small pockets of French. During the early modern period German still dominated though French, Italian and Romansh began to develop literary traditions within the boundaries of modern Switzerland.

=== German writings ===
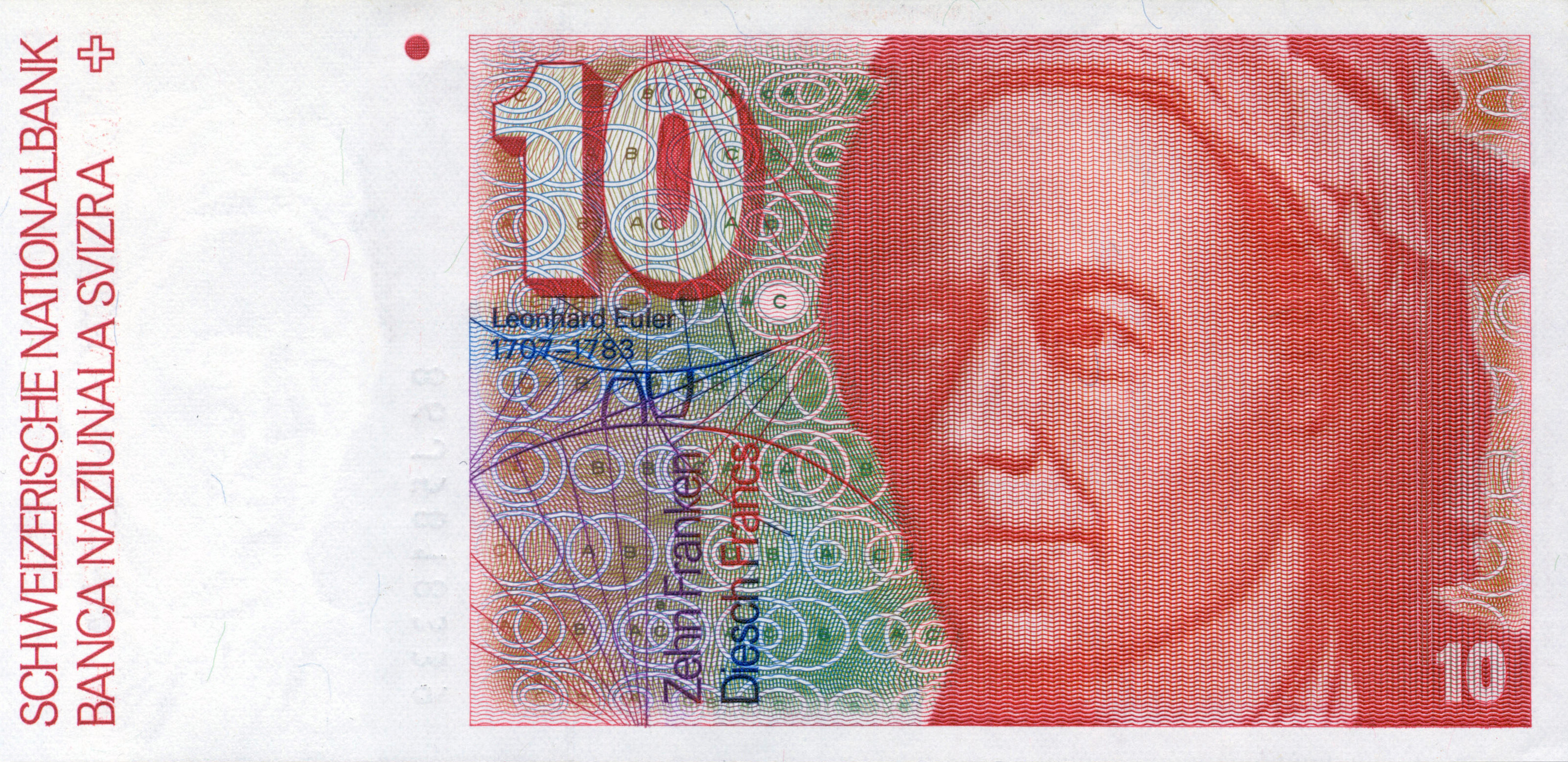
Old Swiss 10 Franc Banknote honouring Leonhard Euler who developed many key concepts in mathematics, calculus, physics and engineering

In the 18th century the intellectual movement in Switzerland greatly developed, though it was naturally strongly influenced by local characteristics. Basel, Bern and especially Zürich were the chief literary centres. Basel was distinguished for its mathematicians, such as Leonhard Euler (1707–1783), and three members of the Bernoulli family, the brothers Jakob (1654–1705) and Johann (1667–1748), and the latter's son Daniel (1700–1782). But its chief literary glory was Isaak Iselin (1728–1782), one of the founders of the Helvetic Society (1760) and of the Economical Society (1777). He wrote about the philosophy of history, ideal politics and economics.

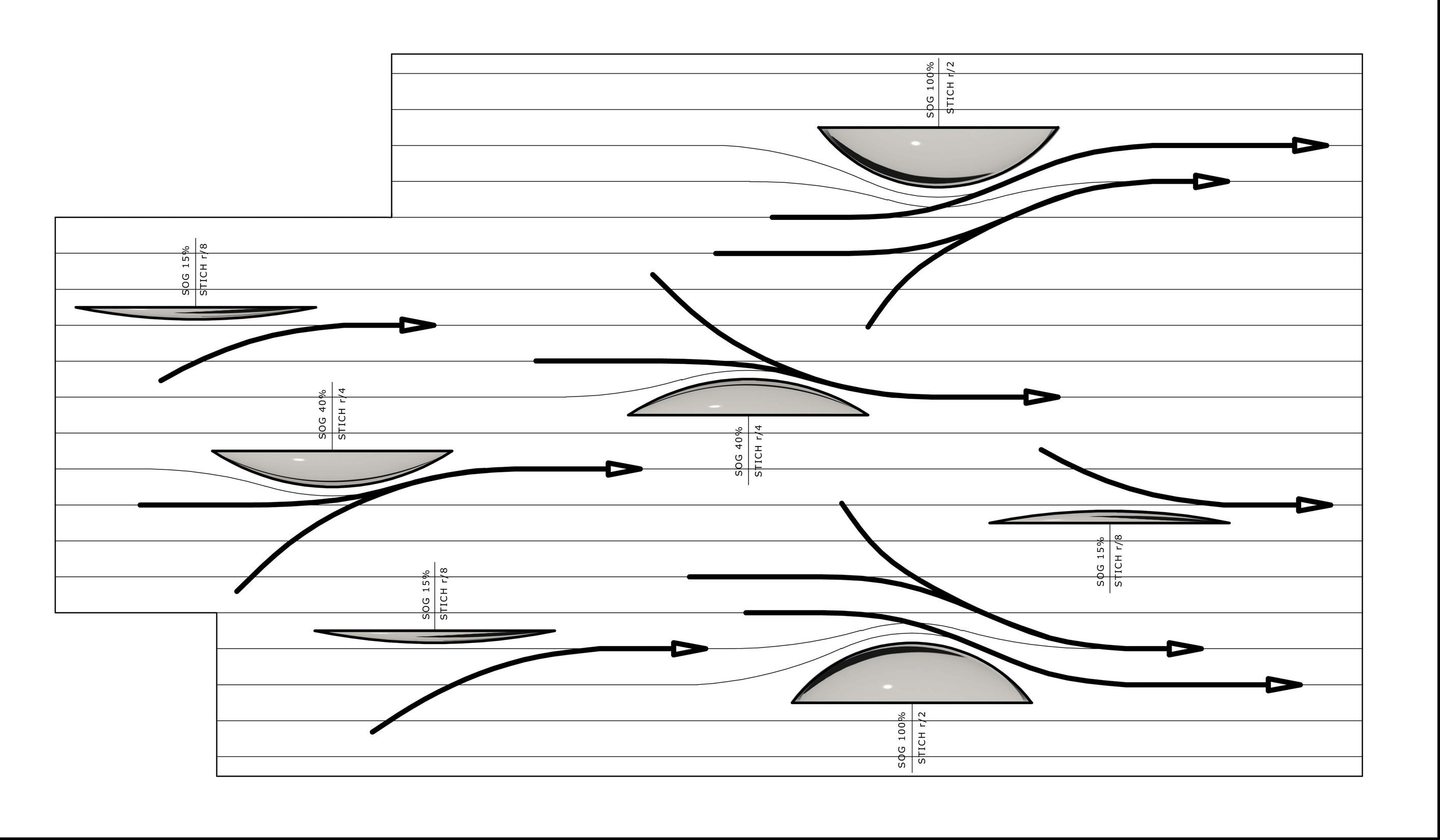
Air-flow over different shapes (a first step in developing wings for flight) was one of many subjects studied by the Bernoulli family in Switzerland.

In Bern both German and French were commonly used in writing, making the separation of Bernese authors into one category difficult. Albrecht von Haller wrote both scientific works as well as poems which praised the beauty of the countryside. His son Gottlieb Emanuel von Haller (1735–1786), compiled a useful bibliography of writings relating to Swiss history, which is still used today. Beat Ludwig von Muralt (1656–1749) analysed, in French, the racial characteristics of other nations for the instruction of his fellow-countrymen. Samuel Wyttenbach (1748–1830), Gottlieb Sigmund Gruner and Johann Georg Altmann (1697–1758) all wrote descriptions of the countryside in a combination of literary and scientific styles.

In Zürich JJ Scheuchzer wrote in Latin of his travels around the country, and shared them with the London Royal Society of which he was a Fellow. He associated closely with other Fellows of the Royal Society, including Isaac Newton. JJ Bodmer and his friend Johann Jakob Breitinger (1701–1776) were among the most prominent purely literary writers in the city. Another famous Zürich writer was Solomon Gesner, the pastoral poet, and yet another was JK Lavater, now best remembered as a supporter of the view that the face presents a perfect indication of character and that physiognomy may therefore he treated as a science. Other well-known Zürich names are those of JH Pestalozzi (1746–1827), the educationalist, of Hans Caspar Hirzel (1725–1803), another of the founders of the Helvetic Society, and of Johann Georg Sulzer (1720–1779), whose chief work is one on the laws of art or aesthetics.

Outside the three towns named above there were several significant writers of German-speaking Switzerland. One of the best known is Johann Georg Zimmermann (1728–1795), whose Betrachtungen ueber die Einsamkeit (1756-1784/1785) profoundly impressed his contemporaries. He, like the fabulist AE Erhlich, was born at Brugg. Johannes von Müller of Schaffhausen, was the first who attempted to write (1780) a detailed history of Switzerland, which, though inspired more by his love of freedom than by any deep research, was very characteristic of his times. JG Ebel was a Swiss by adoption only, but deserves mention as the author of the first detailed guidebook to the country (1793), which held its ground until the days of Murray and Baedeker. A later writer, Heinrich Zschokke (1771–1848), also a Swiss by adoption only, produced (1822) a history of Switzerland written for the people, which had a great vogue.

=== French writing ===
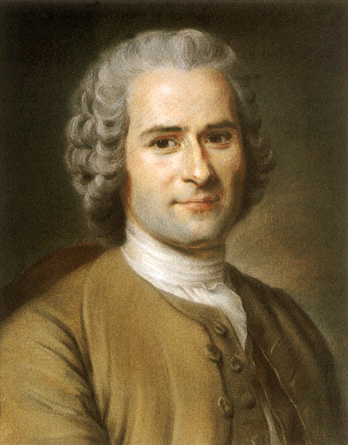
Jean-Jacques Rousseau wrote in Geneva during the 18th century.

The 18th century was the "golden age" for Swiss literature. This was due to the influence of French refugees who came to Switzerland after the Revocation of the Edict of Nantes in 1685. Among the refugees was Louis Bourguet (1678–1743) who wrote geological works and founded two periodicals that provided Italian research and works by French Swiss authors to the country. Abraham Ruchat (1678–1750), who was published in Bourguet's periodicals, is best known as the author (under the pen-name of Gottlieb Kypseler) of an excellent guide-book to Switzerland, which was published from 1714 until 1778. Around the same time the historian Charles Guillaume Loys de Bochat (1695–1754) and the philosopher JP de Crousaz (1663–1750), were working the Vaud region, which was at the time part of the Canton of Bern. A French refugee at Lausanne, Jean Barbeyrac (1674–1744), published in 1712 a translation of Samuel von Pufendorf's works on natural law. The philosopher Jean-Jacques Burlamaqui (1694–1750) and the celebrated international lawyer Emeric de Vattel (1714 1767) were natives of Neuchâtel, though de Vattle only returned to die in the city.

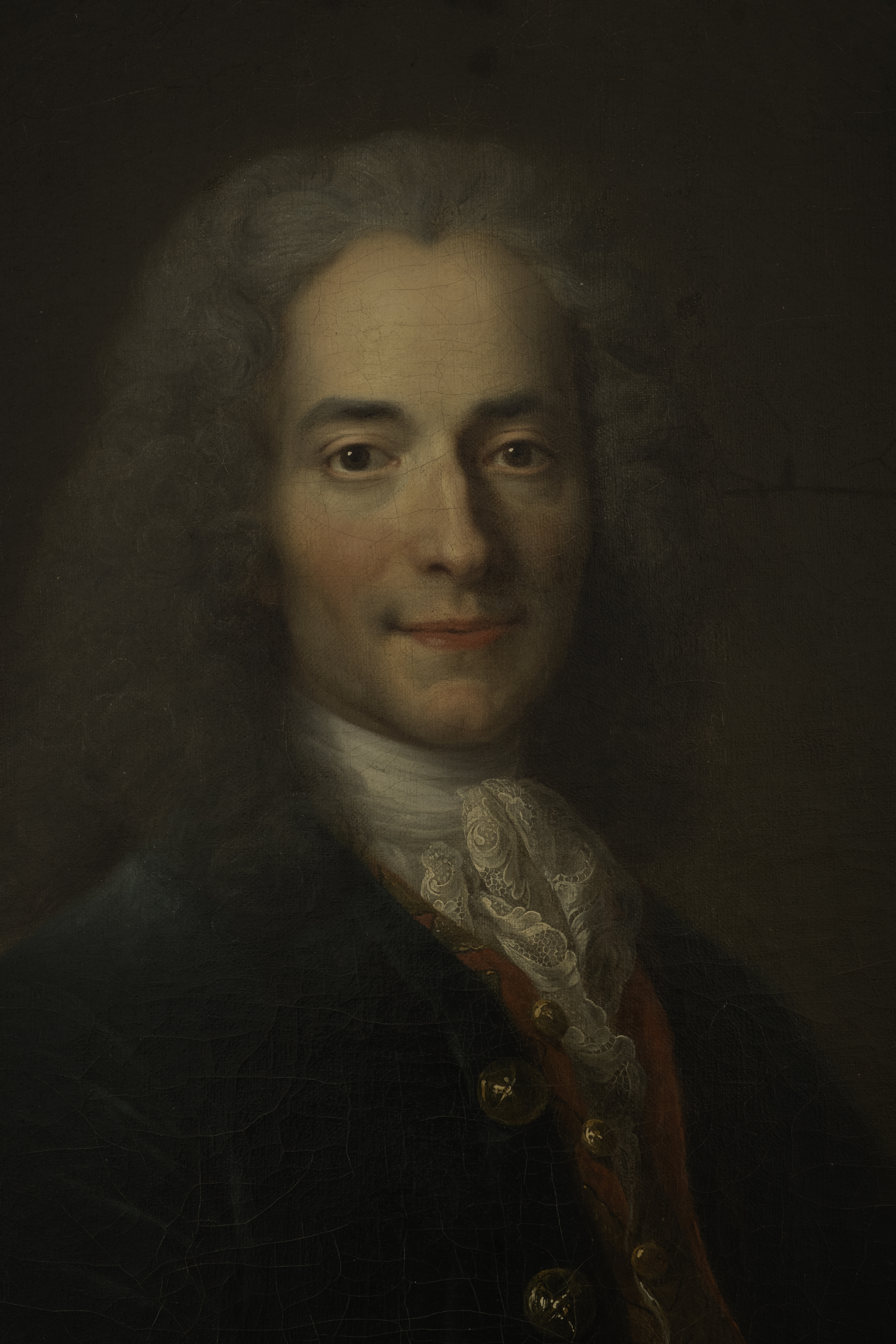
Voltaire wrote Candide: Or, Optimism, one of his best known works while in Switzerland.

The second half of the 18th century was when some of the best known writers of the era established themselves in what would become French Switzerland. In 1754, the famed philosopher Rousseau came back for good to Geneva, and Voltaire established himself at Ferney, while in 1753 the historian Edward Gibbon moved to Lausanne. These three, while their works were not specifically Swiss, lead the golden age of French literature in Switzerland.

Also during this time there were other active writers. Madame de Charrière (1740–1805) was Dutch by birth, but married to a native of Neuchâtel. She wrote of sad results of an unsuitable marriage and set her books in highly detailed small provincial towns. Paul Henri Mallet, a Genevese, who held a chair at Copenhagen, devoted himself to making known to the educated world the history and antiquities of Scandinavia.

During the mid and late 18th century Geneva produced a number of scientists who were interested in the characteristics of the Alps. The chief of this school was Horace-Bénédict de Saussure one of the founders of the sciences of geology and meteorology, while his Alpine ascents (undertaken in the cause of science) opened a new world even to non-scientific travellers. Jean-André Deluc devoted himself mainly to questions of physics in the Alps, while Jean Sénebier, the biographer of Saussure, was more known as a physiologist than as a physicist, though he wrote on many branches of natural science, which in those days was not yet highly specialised. On the other hand, Marc Théodore Bourrit, the contemporary of these three men, was rather a curious and inquisitive traveller than a scientific investigator, and charms us even now by his genial simplicity as contrasted with the austerity and gravity of the three writers we have mentioned.

In Vaud, at this time part of the Canton of Bern, nationalist feelings among the French-speaking inhabitants and against the German-speaking Bern administration began to grow. Philippe Cyriaque Bridel (1757–1845), began writing poetry in 1782 and is considered the earliest Vaudois poet. His descriptions of his travels around the Vaud region were published in serial form for nearly 50 years, from 1783 until 1831. His paintings and written portraits of the Vaud countryside inspired a number of later writers and helped unify the nationalist movement in Vaud.

== See also ==
- 17th-century philosophy
- Age of Enlightenment
- History of Switzerland
- Swiss peasant war of 1653

== Notes and references ==
=== Bibliography ===
- Coolidge, William Augustus Brevoort (1911). "Switzerland § Literature" . In Chisholm, Hugh (ed.). Encyclopædia Britannica. Vol. 26 (11th ed.). Cambridge University Press.
- Häuser, Albert (1987). Was für ein Leben: Schweizer Alltag vom 15. bis 18. Jahrhundert. Verlag Neue Zürcher Zeitung. ISBN 978-3-85823-179-6.
