= Salomon Hirzel =

Salomon Hirzel may refer to:

- Salomon Hirzel (historian) (1727–1818), Swiss politician and historian, treasurer of Zurich
- Salomon Hirzel (publisher) (1804–1877), Swiss-German publisher, co-head of the Weidmannsche Buchhandlung
