= Joseph Maria Christen =

Swiss sculptor (1767-1838)

- Born: Joseph Anton Maria Christen; 22 February 1767; Buochs, Switzerland
- Died: 30 March 1838 (aged 71); Thorberg, Switzerland
- Occupation: Sculptor
- Known for: Portrait busts, medallions
- Movement: Neoclassicism

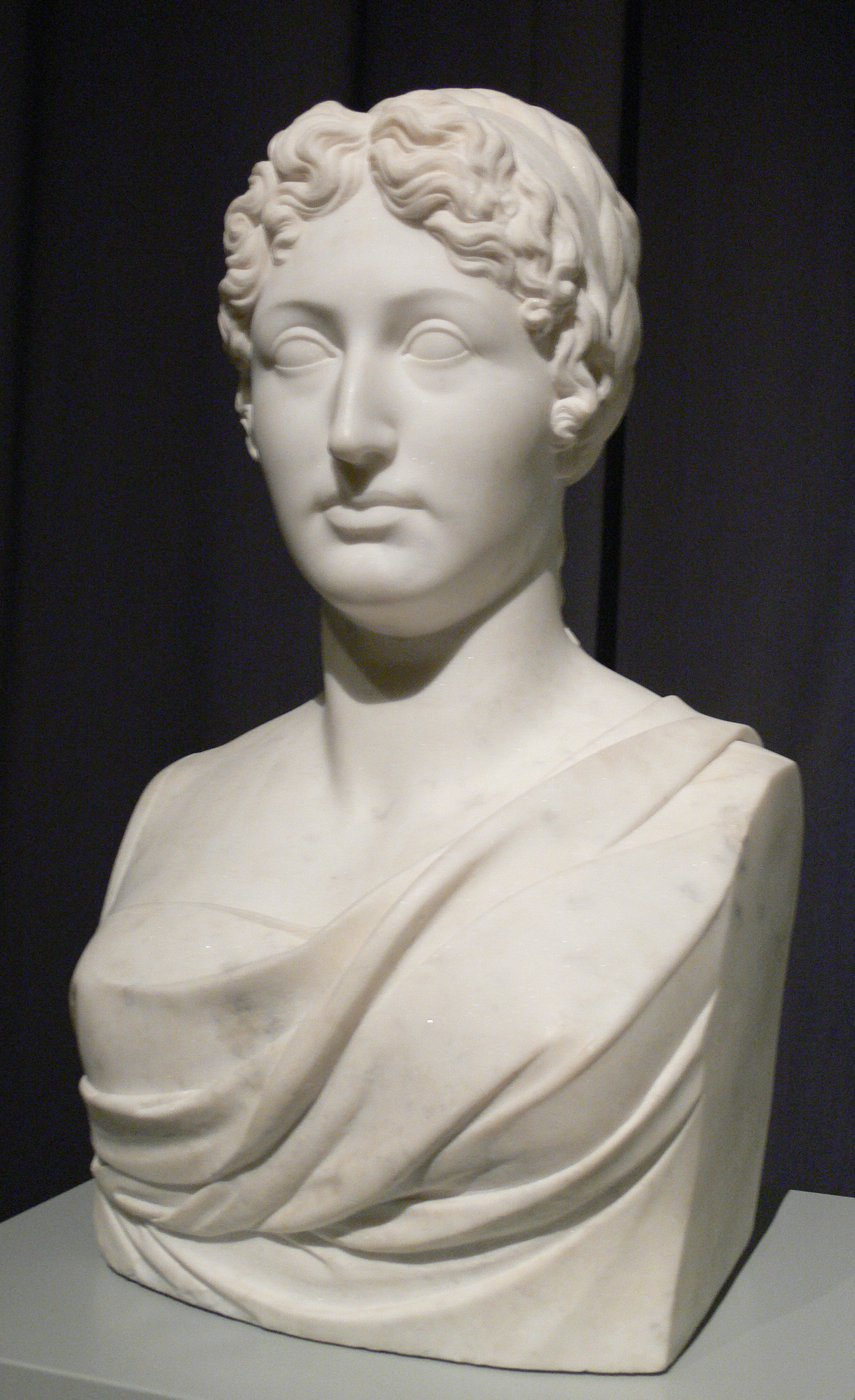
Bust of Countess Ernestine von Montgelas, wife of Maximilian von Montgelas, 1822

Joseph Anton Maria Christen (22 February 1767 – 30 March 1838) was a Swiss sculptor known for his portrait busts. He worked in a Neoclassical style and gained recognition beyond Switzerland with his 1805 bust of Napoleon.

== Biography ==
Joseph Maria Christen was born on 22 February 1767 in Buochs. His father, Johann Jakob Walter Laurenz Christen, painted religious images and also worked as a shepherd and woodcarver. Christen grew up in a family of limited means, received no formal education and began earning money during childhood.

In 1785, Christen entered the drawing school in Lucerne, where he studied under Johann Melchior Wyrsch and also trained in woodcarving. Three years later, he travelled to Rome to study with the Swiss sculptor Alexander Trippel.

In 1790, Christen was in Zurich and later spent time in Stans and Lucerne. His marriage to Rosina Scheuermann, a Protestant from Aarburg, further distanced him from his home region. Before settling in Basel in 1800, he moved between Bern, Lucerne, Aarau and Basel. He remained based in Basel until 1817.

Christen and his wife had six children. Their eldest son, Raphael Christen, also became a sculptor. Christen became a citizen of Aarau in 1819. He later worked in Germany, including a period working with Ludwig Schwanthaler in Munich in 1824, and produced models for an iron foundry from 1826 to 1831.

After returning to Switzerland, an illness led to his being placed under guardianship and later admitted to the psychiatric institution at Königsfelden. He was subsequently transferred to the institution at Thorberg, where he died on 30 March 1838.

== Work ==
Christen was a sculptor and woodcarver who produced portrait busts and figures from mythology. His training in Rome under Alexander Trippel marked a shift towards Neoclassicism.

After finding patrons in Zurich, Christen gained commissions from collectors in Basel who had previously supported Trippel. Portrait busts and medallions gradually became the main focus of his work.

His colossal bust of Napoleon, made in Milan in 1805, brought him recognition beyond Switzerland. He received numerous portrait commissions during the occupation of Basel in 1813 and around the time of the Congress of Vienna in 1815. These were among the most successful years of his career. While in Vienna, he made portraits of prominent participants in the congress, including Klemens von Metternich and Alexander I of Russia.

Christen also received commissions for portrait busts for the Walhalla memorial near Regensburg. Only the 1812 bust of Heinrich von Hallwyl was completed. In 1818, he produced a marble bust of the Swiss politician Frédéric-César de La Harpe for the Aargau government, which was planning a hall of fame modelled on the Walhalla.

Other works include the 1799 funerary monument to Esther Forcart-Weiss in Basel and the now-lost sculpture Venus Anadyomene of 1809.

Works by Christen are held in collections including the Aargauer Kunsthaus and the Historisches Museum Basel.

== Gallery ==
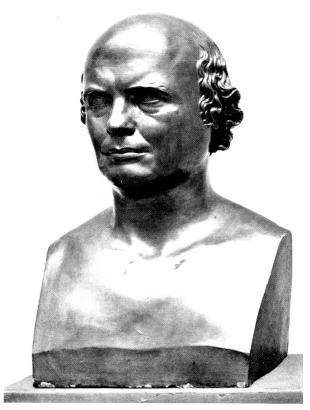
Portrait of Franz Xaver Bronner

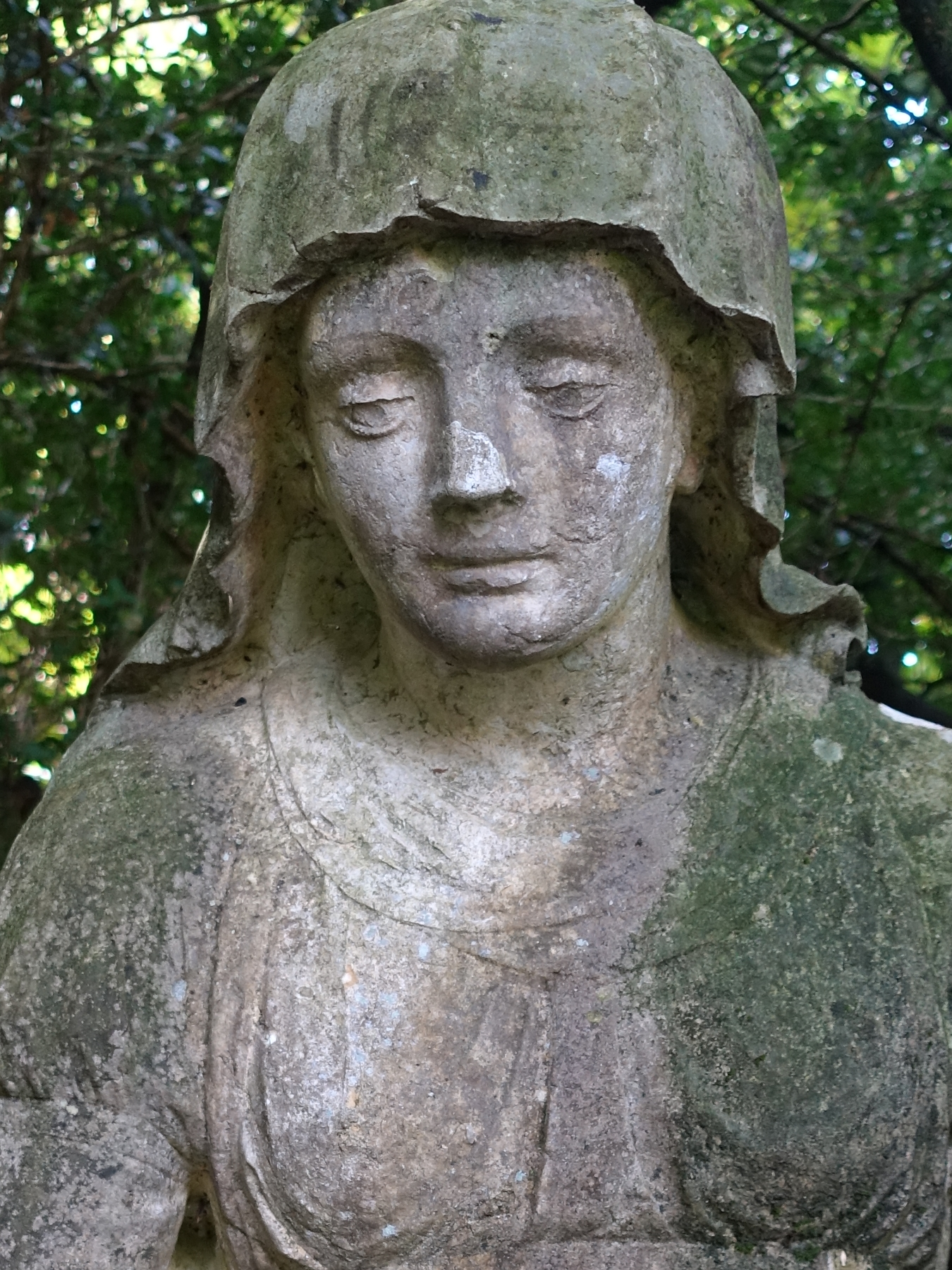
Funerary monument in the Wettsteinanlage, Riehen, attributed to Christen
