= Place de la Palud =

Square in Lausanne, Switzerland

Coordinates: 46.52183471253074°N 6.633037243661226°E

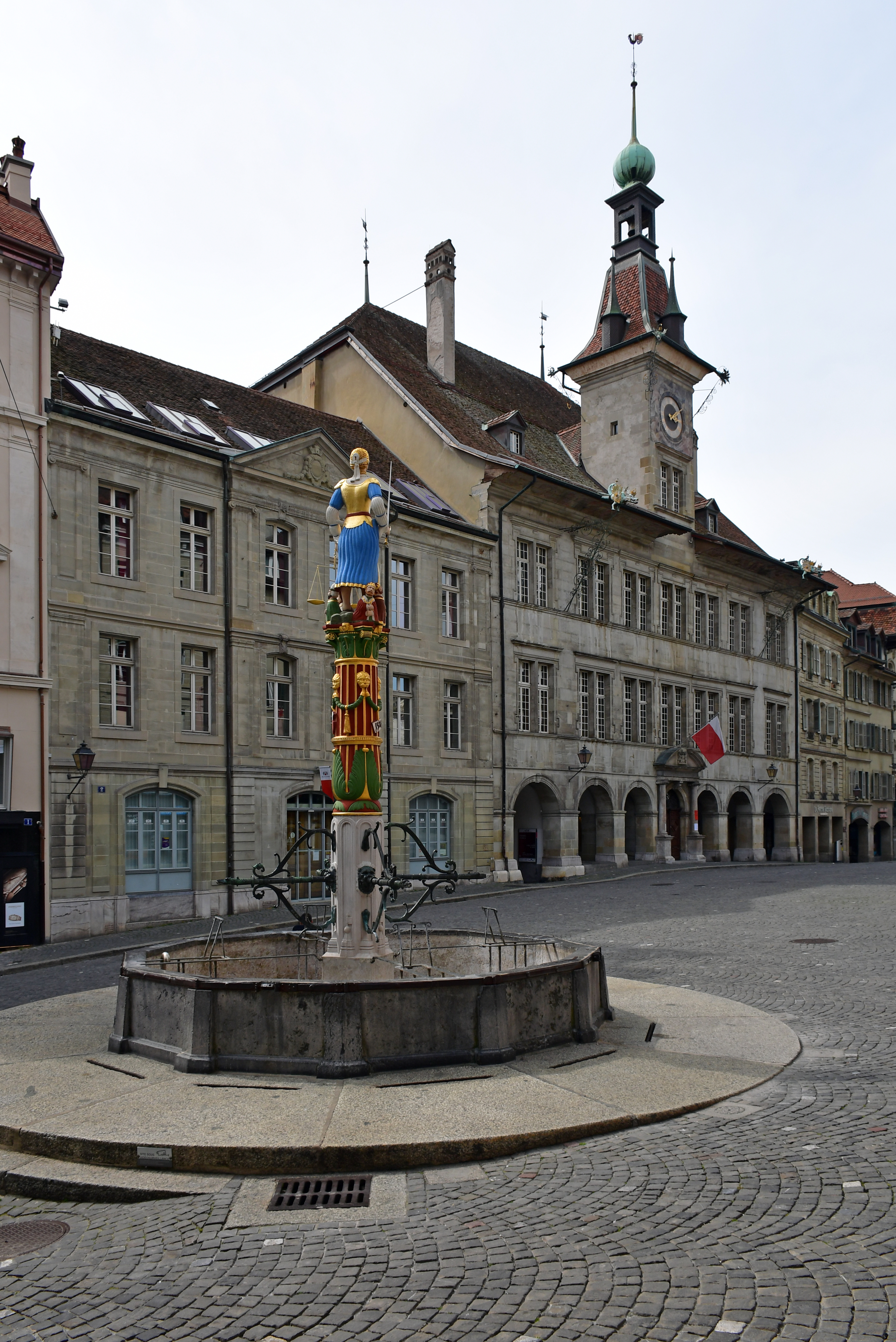
Place de la Palud in 2020.

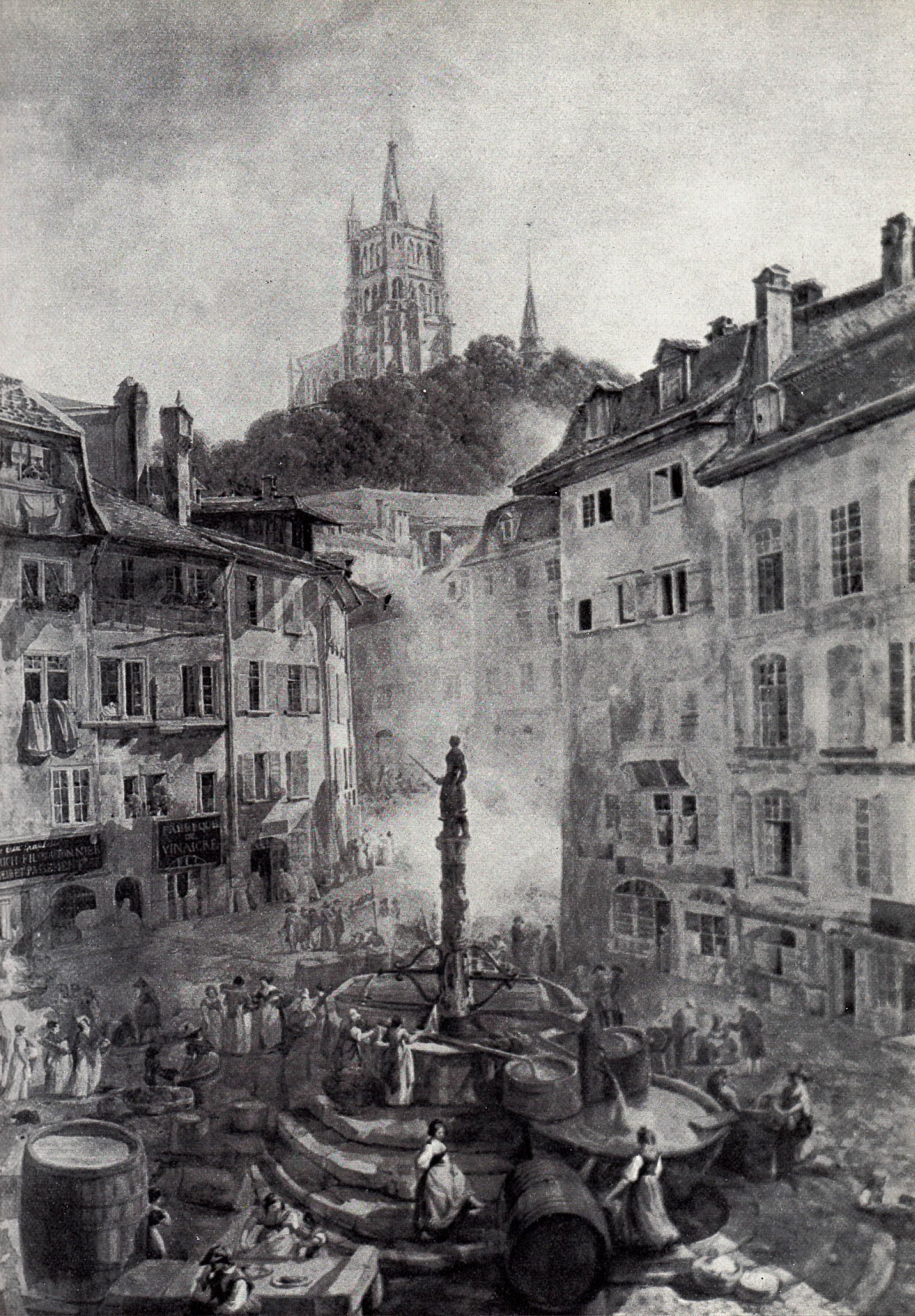
Place de la Palud in 1800, with the Fountain of Justice at its center, by Abraham-Louis-Rodolphe Ducros.

Place de la Palud is a cobblestone square in the Old Town of Lausanne, Switzerland.

== History ==
Towards the end of the 9th century, when the city of Lausanne was limited to the Cité hill given the region's topography, the communication routes heading west and south naturally passed through slightly marshy terrain from which it was possible to turn west to cross the Louve or south to cross the Flon. This intersection, which would become the Place de la Palud, saw the creation of a small market. The existence of the square is attested by a 13th-century document. Its name recalls that the area was once marshy, "palud" being an outdated synonym for "marsh".

The market grew in importance over the years and was considered the city's main market in 1220; the market on Place du Crêt was relocated there in the 14th century. Documents mention a covered market hall from the 14th century, serving as a warehouse, shelter for merchants, and a weighing room for goods. The market, which was then probably limited to the eastern part of the current square and which had recently become home to goldsmiths, tailors, hatters and other craftsmen in addition to market gardeners and butchers, became cramped at the beginning of the 15th century. The Palud district having been partly destroyed by a fire in 1405, the bishop of Lausanne decided to buy some of the houses around the square to rebuild new halls specifically for wheat. The work was used to level the bumpy and sloping square. These new wooden market halls again quickly proved too small, and a new one, partially built of masonry, was added in 1415. From then on, public assemblies, in case of bad weather, were held in the market halls, which were eventually transformed into a town hall between 1454 and 1461. The Town council met there for the first time on January 24, 1469; La Palud became the town's administrative center, a status confirmed after the union of the Lower Town and the City in 1481. From 1501, elections for the Council and the Syndic (mayor) were held in La Palud and no longer at the cathedral.

The "modern" Town Hall was built in 1675 and was raised in 1816 by the architect Henri Perregaux. It was on Place de la Palud that the Independence of Vaud was proclaimed on January 24, 1798. Cheese merchants joined the market in the mid-19th century. The covered market was moved to the Grenette on the new Place de la Riponne in 1840, and part of the ground floor of the town hall housed the guardhouse, which remained there until 1903. The square was lit by gas in 1848.

Place de la Palud became pedestrianized in 1972, and cafés opened terraces the following year. Since then the square has been the site of numerous folk and political events, concerts, and demonstrations.

== Features and attractions ==
=== Fountain of Justice ===
Documents from the 13th century report the presence of a fountain, first dug into a tree trunk, then made of stone from 1557. A statue of Lady Justice was installed there in 1585 and it received a new basin in 1726. A washing tub was later added before being removed in 1906.

=== Palud Clock ===
On the first floor of the building behind the fountain is an animated clock. It was commissioned by the merchants' association for the 1964 Swiss National Exhibition and inaugurated on April 25, 1964. It was completely renovated in 2005. Every hour between 8 a.m. and 7 pm, three groups of figurines emerge from the partition and circulate to a musical background. The first scene depicts Abraham Davel's attempt to liberate the Vaud region from Bernese domination; the second depicts the arrival of the deputies at the first session, on April 14, 1803, of the Grand Council of Vaud; and the third scene depicts six dancing couples in traditional Vaudois dress, symbolizing moments of joy in the canton. While the first two groups of figurines walk along the clock from right to left, the group of dancers circles around it before re-entering it. The scenes are described by the recorded voice of Pierre Walker, a comedian, actor and radio host from Vaud, who plays the role of the cathedral lookout who witnessed these events.

=== Market ===
A market is held in the square and in the surrounding streets every Wednesday and Saturday.
