= Louis Vulliemin =

Swiss theologian and historian

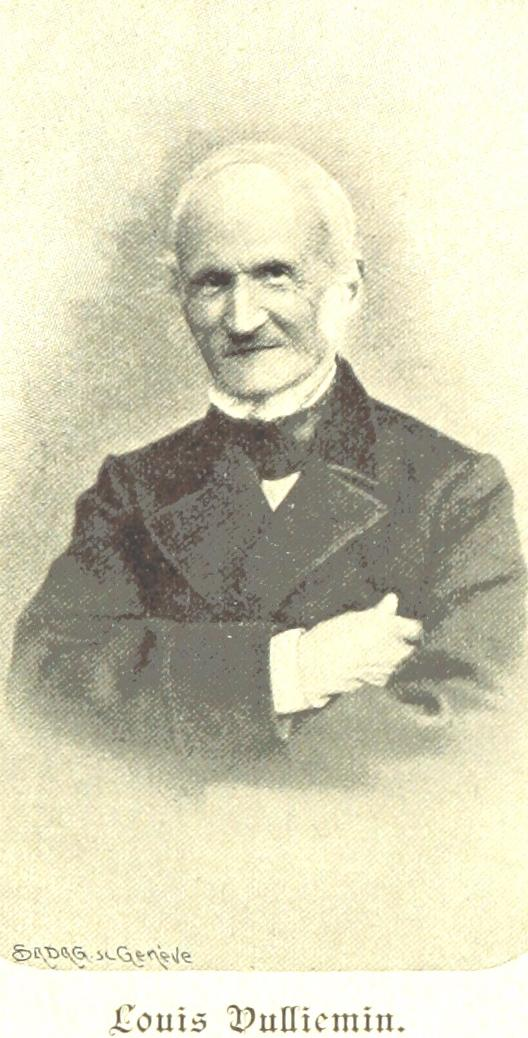
Louis Vulliemin

Louis Vulliemin (7 September 1797, in Yverdon-les-Bains – 10 August 1879, in Lausanne) was a Swiss theologian and historian.

He was educated at Johann Heinrich Pestalozzi's institute in Yverdon, then studied theology at the Academy of Lausanne, being ordained as a pastor in 1821. Later on, he was honorary professor of history, philosophy and literature at the Academy (1837–79). From 1847 to 1864 he was also a professor of theology to the faculty of the Free Evangelical Church in Lausanne.

He was a founding member and first president of the Société d'histoire de la Suisse Romande (1837–55).

== Selected works ==
With Charles Monnard, he published a French translation and continuation of Johann von Müller's Geschichten schweizerischer Eidgenossenschaft with the title Histoire de la Confédération suisse (18 volumes, 1837–51). He also published an edition of Abraham Ruchat's Histoire de la Réformation de la Suisse (7 volumes, 1835–38). Other noted works by Vulliemin are:

- Considérations sur les moeurs des Chrétiens : leur culte et leur gouvernement pendant les trois premiers siècles, 1829 – Considerations on Christian morals, its religion and government for the first three centuries.
- Chillon; étude historique, 1851 – Chillon, historical study.
- La Suisse historique et pittoresque, comprenant l'histoire, la géographie et la statistique de ce pays, avec un précis des antiquités, (2 volumes 1855–56, with others) – The historic and picturesque Switzerland, including history, geography, etc.
- Le canton de Vaud. Tableau de ses aspects de son histoire, de son administration et de ses moeurs, 1862 – The canton of Vaud; Tableau on aspects of its history, administration and customs.
