= Juliane Giovane =

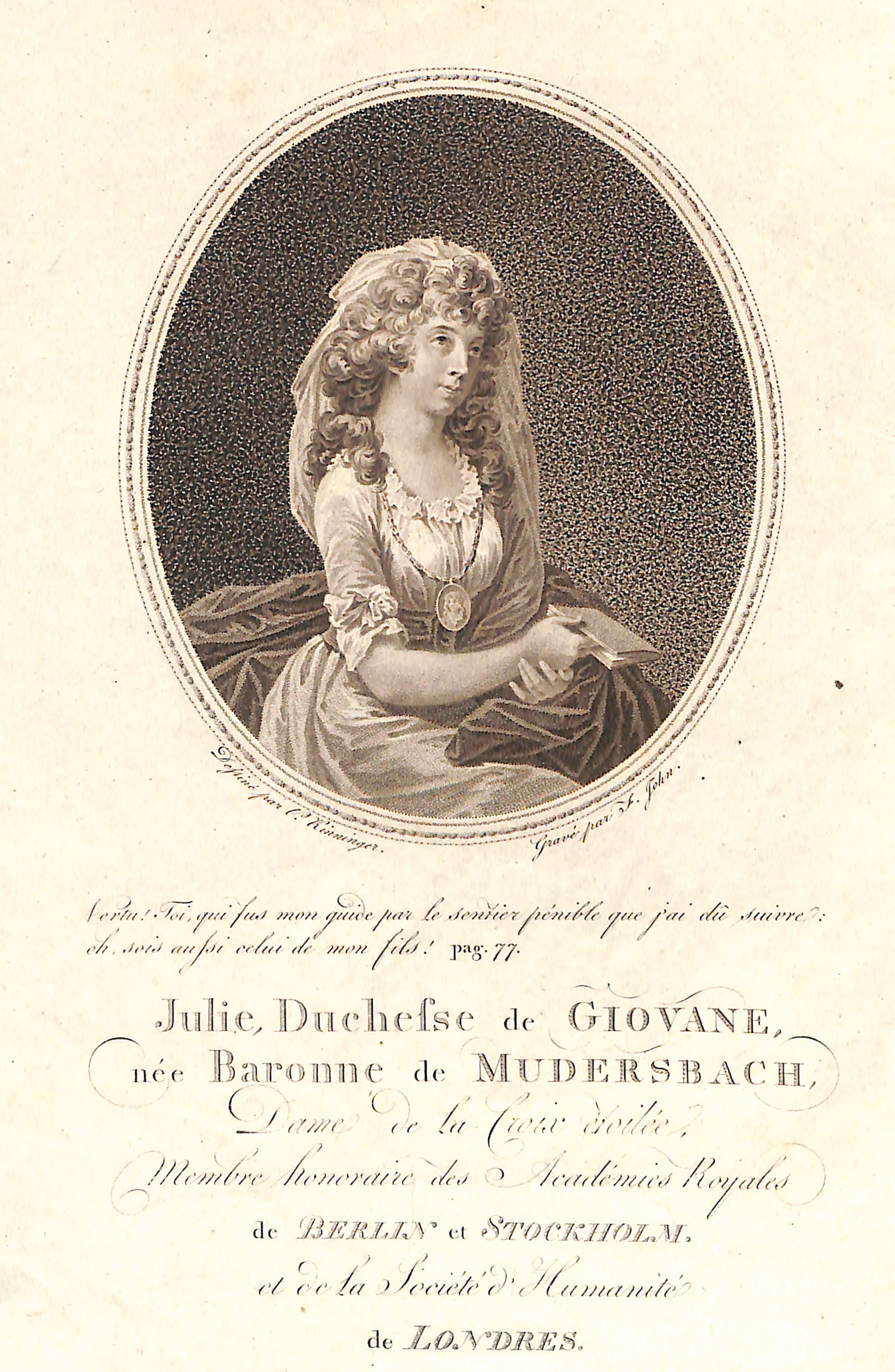
Portrait of Juliane Giovane di Girasole (1766-1805)

Juliane Giovane (21 December 1766 in Würzburg – August 1805 in Budapest) was a German writer and lady in waiting for Queen Maria Caroline of Naples, and the second female member of the Prussian Academy of Sciences.

== Life ==
Giovane was born Juliane von Mudersbach at Augustinergasse 11 in Würzburg, to a family of the lower nobility which had connections to the prince-bishop Philipp von Schönborn. As a child she was encouraged to learn by Karl Theodor von Dalberg, a friend of her mother's, and at the age of 13 was already credited with speaking Italian like a native. As a teenager, she contributed to the short-lived women's magazine Pomona für Teutschlands Töchter, in which Sophia von La Roche also participated. At this time she also contributed to public essay competitions on Enlightenment themes, and wrote Idylls inspired by Salomon Gessner and Ovid.

On 18 April 1786 at the Michaelskirche in Würzburg, Giovane was married by proxy to Duke Nicola Giovene di Girasole (who was represented by the Baron von Eberstein) and moved to his home in Naples. Their son Carlo was born just over a year later on 30 April 1787, and had Queen Maria Carolina as his godmother. A daughter, Elisabetta, died young.

On 2 June 1787, just days after the birth of her son, Giovane received Johann Wolfgang von Goethe in Naples while the latter was on his tour through Italy. According to Goethe, they discussed Herder, Garve, and female authors in Germany, and watched Vesuvius erupting in the evening, with Giovane seeking from him approval of her own literary ambitions. Herder and his wife Karoline would later visit Giovane in Naples on 2 February 1789.

After separating from her husband in 1790, Giovane moved to Vienna. Her son remained in Naples and in 1796 she dedicated her Idèes sur la maniére de rendre les voyage des jeunes gens utils à leur propre culture to him.

Giovane made a name for herself at the Viennese court in 1795 through her writings on education and became employed as a Hofmeister in the court of the Archduchess Marie Louise, the granddaughter of Queen Maria Caroline. She was the winner of the Star Cross Order. On 16 January 1794, Frederick William II of Prussia announced she was to be included in the Prussian Academy of Sciences, becoming the second female member. She was also an honorary member of the Royal Swedish Academy of Sciences.

From 1800 to 1804 she lived in Vienna with Josephine Deym. Due either to her poor health or to debts at court, she then moved into the home of the Brunszvik family in Budapest, where she died in 1805.

== Works ==
- Die vier Weltalter: Nach dem Ovid in vier Styken; Auf die Aufhebung der Leibeigenschaft in Böhmen. 1783. [reprint Vienna, 1793]
- Abhandlung über die Frage: Welche dauerhafte Mittel giebt es, die Menschen ohne äußerliche Gewalt zum Guten zu führen. 1785 Digitalisat bei Bayerische Staatsbibliothek
- Lettera di una dama sul codice delle leggi di S. Leucio. Naples, 1789 [reprint Vienna, 1793.]
- Review of Joseph Stahel's Lettres sur l’education des princesses. Vienna, 1791.
- Gesammelte Schriften der Frau Herzoginn Julie von Giovane gebornen Reichsfreyinn von Mudersbach, Sternkreuz-Ordensdame, Ehrenmitgliedes der K. Akademie der Schönen Wissenschaftern, Künste und Alterthümer zu Stockholm, edited by Joseph Edler von Retzer. Vienna, 1793.
- Table d’observations statistiques et politiques, d’après l’état actuel c. 1794–1805 des nations civilisées. Vienna, s.d.
- Idèes sur la maniére de rendre les voyage des jeunes gens utils à leur propre culture. 1796.
- Plan pour faire servir les voyages a la culture des jeunes gens qui se vouent au service de l’etat dans la carriere politique, accompagne d’un precis historique de l’usage de voyager [...]. Vienna,1797
- with Karl Theodor von Dalberg und Ludovico di Breme. De l’influence des sciences et des beaux-arts sur la tranquilité publique. Parma, 1802
