= Alexander Trippel =

Swiss sculptor (1744–1793)

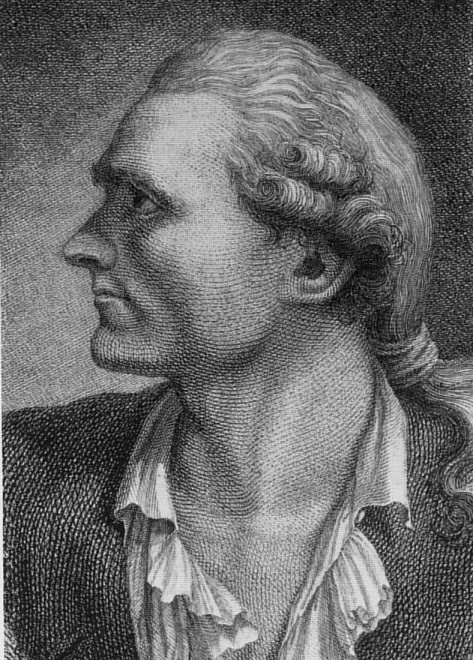
- Engraving after Clemens, 1775
- Born: 23 September 1744; Schaffhausen, Old Swiss Confederacy
- Died: 24 September 1793 (aged 49); Rome, Papal States
- Occupation: Sculptor
- Notable work: The Resting Hercules (1775); Tomb of Zakhar Chernyshev (1789); Salomon Gessner monument, Zurich (1793)
- Parents: Hans Jakob Trippel (father); Ursula Habicht (mother)

Alexander Trippel (23 September 1744 – 24 September 1793) was a Swiss sculptor from Schaffhausen. After an apprenticeship in London and years in Copenhagen and Paris, he moved to Rome in 1776 and established himself there as the leading artist and teacher of the young German Neoclassicism. His plaster figure The Resting Hercules (1775), conceived as an allegory of the Swiss Confederacy, aroused the interest of Swiss Enlightenment thinkers, and his monument to Salomon Gessner (1793) in Zurich was the first civic monument of the Enlightenment in Switzerland.

== Biography ==
Alexander Trippel was born on 23 September 1744 in Schaffhausen, the son of Hans Jakob Trippel, a joiner (Schreiner), and Ursula Habicht. He remained unmarried. In 1755 he came to London with his mother, who had followed her emigrant husband there, and he helped his father in his workshop. In 1760 he began an apprenticeship as a musical instrument maker, and shortly afterwards as an ivory carver in the workshop of Johann Lücke in London.

After the death of his mother, Trippel found a place in Copenhagen, in 1761 in the studio of the sculptor Johannes Wiedewelt and from 1766 with Carl Frederik Stanley. Under Wiedewelt he was influenced by Johann Joachim Winckelmann's reception of antiquity, and he worked among other things on the Danish royal tombs in Roskilde Cathedral. Stanley enabled him to attend the Royal Academy, where he won the large gold medal in 1768.

During his years in Paris, from 1772 to 1775, Trippel developed his virtuosity. Through the mediation of Christian von Mechel, his plaster figure Der ruhende Herkules (The Resting Hercules, 1775), conceived as an allegory of the Swiss Confederacy, aroused the interest of Swiss Enlightenment thinkers. Of his designs for the Helvetic Society, however, only the base of a cup (Pokalsockel), showing Tell with his son, was executed. This group of figures later became the emblem of the Helvetic Republic.

As a sculptor, Trippel found hardly any patrons in Switzerland able to pay for his work. In 1776 he moved to Rome, where he established himself as the leading artist and teacher of the young German Neoclassicism. In Rome he made portraits of Johann Wolfgang von Goethe (1788, 1790), among others, and in 1787 he received his first major commission, the tomb of Governor Zakhar Chernyshev (1789). With the monument to Salomon Gessner (1793) in Zurich he created the first civic (bürgerlich) monument of the Enlightenment in Switzerland. His last monumental work, the tomb of Prince Johann Nepomuk of Schwarzenberg in Třeboň, now in the Czech Republic, was completed shortly after his death. Trippel died in Rome on 24 September 1793.

== Bibliography ==
- K. H. Vogler, "Der Bildhauer Alexander Trippel aus Schaffhausen", in Neujahrsblatt des Kunstvereins und des Historisch-antiquarischen Vereins zu Schaffhausen, 1, 1892; 2, 1893
- Alexander Trippel, exhibition catalogue, Schaffhausen, 1993
- D. Ulrich, "Alexander Trippel als 'Fall'", in Outlines, 2, 2004
- B. Maaz, "Alexander Trippel", in Antikes Leben, exhibition catalogue, Bad Arolsen, 2009
