= Johann Rudolf Tschiffeli =

Swiss agronomist

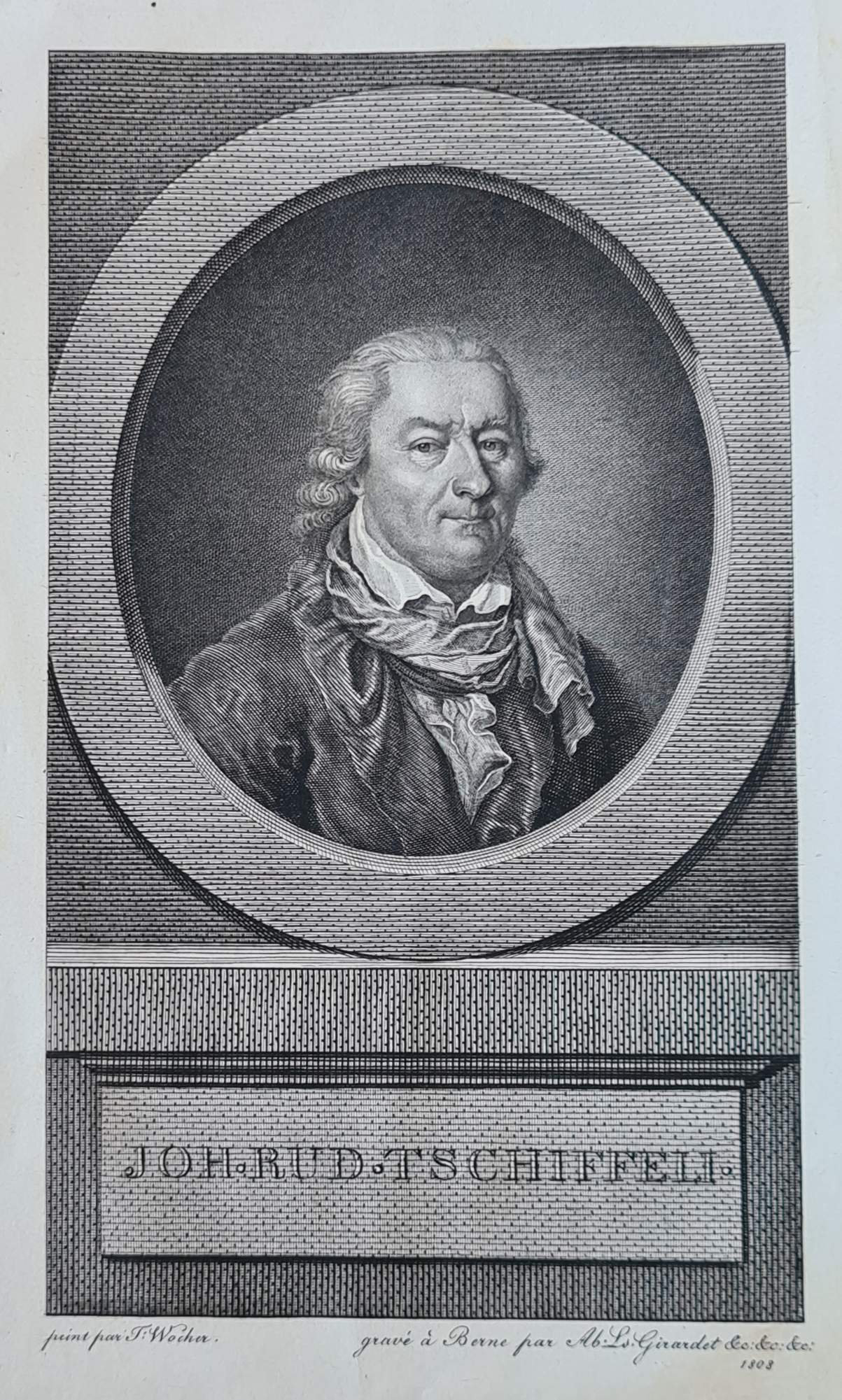
Portrait of Tschiffeli, engraving by Abraham-Louis Girardet from 1808 after a painting by Tiberius Wocher

Johann Rudolf Tschiffeli (16 December 1716 - 15 January 1780) was a Swiss agronomist who founded the Economic Society of Berne in 1758. He was a wealthy merchant, economist and lawyer.

== Biography ==
Johann Rudolph Tschiffeli was born in Bern in 1716, in a patrician family. He spent much of his youth in Rheineck. His father, also named Johann Rudolpf Tschiffeli (1688 - 1747), was at first the General Secretary of Canton of St. Gallen and from 1734 on the Landvogt of Bern, when the family moved to Wangen an der Aare. After the death of his parents, Tschiffeli took over the care of his four younger siblings, and of his own household. In 1755 he became clerk at the superior marriage court, which position meant a steady income. He occupied this post until his death.

In 1758, Tschiffeli formed the Economic Society ("Ökonomischen Gesellschaft"), which was influential beyond the Swiss borders. Albrecht von Haller was at one time the secretary and president of it, and in its long history it had contact with people like Carl Linnaeus, Voltaire, Victor de Riqueti, marquis de Mirabeau, Jean-Marie Roland, vicomte de la Platière, Gaetano Filangieri, and Arthur Young. Members included Niklaus Emanuel Tscharner and Vincenz Bernhard Tscharner. Activities decreased around 1800, but the society was restarted in 1838 and still exists in 2011.

Tschiffeli was also an agricultural reformer, and he owned two farms, one at Kirchberg and one at Moosseedorf. He trained educator Johann Heinrich Pestalozzi in agriculture in 1767 and 1768. Tschiffeli was a member of the Helvetic Society.

== Bibliography ==
- Mémoire sur la culture de la garance, 1765, Rouen, 2 volumes
- Grundsäze der Stadt Bern in ihren ersten Jahrhunderten, 32 pages, Brunner und Haller, 1766
- Von der Stallfütterung und vom Kleebau in der Schweiz, 139 pages, Haller, 1774 (republished 1789)
- Lettres sur la nourriture des bestiaux à l'étable, 72 pages, Perisse, 1779 (republished 1805, 1819)
- L'art de fertiliser les terres, ou observations sur les prairies artificielles & sur l'usage du plâtre employé comme engrais, 48 pages, Perisse, 1779

== See also ==
- Agriculture in Switzerland
