= Raphael Christen =

Swiss sculptor

Raphael Christen (16 July 1811 – 14 January 1880) was a Swiss sculptor.

Christen was born in Basel, son of the sculptor Joseph Maria Christen. He trained under Valentin Sonnenschein and Joseph Simon Volmar. The favour of Charles Victor de Bonstetten enabled him to spend some time in Rome where he continued his studies with Bertel Thorwaldsen. After that he worked for a short time as a teacher in the school of wood-carving in Brienz before eventually settling in Bern.

He created many busts, including one of Guillaume-Henri Dufour (1847) and one of Friedrich Frey-Herosé (about 1848). Among his most important works are four statues on the frontage of the Swiss National Bank head office in Bern, two medallions at the Kunstmuseum Bern and the figure on the Berna Fountain (Bernabrunnen).

He died in Bern, at age 68.
