= Gesellschaft für das Gute und Gemeinnützige =

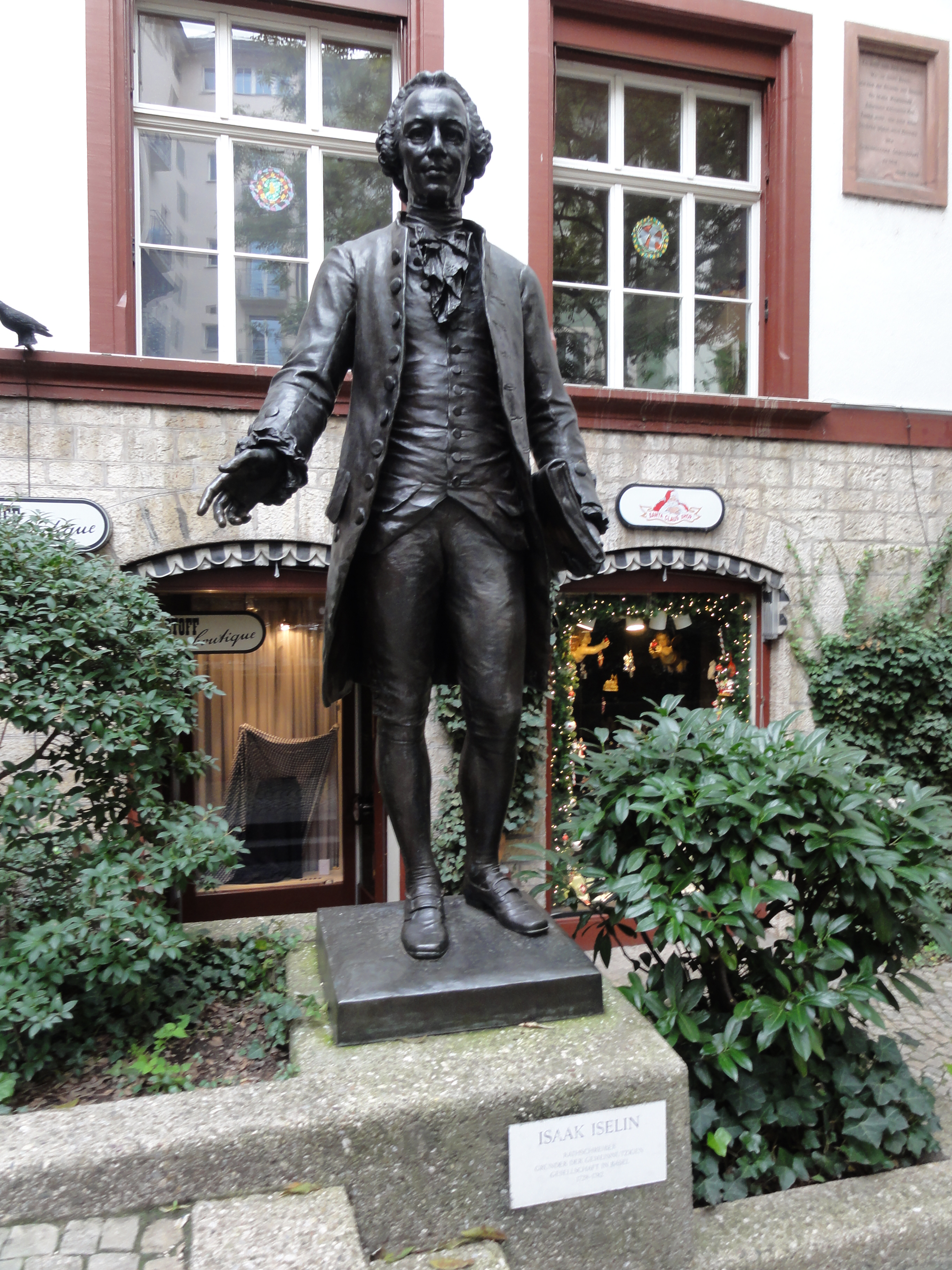
Main building of the GGG Stadtbibliothek Basel in Basel, called "Schmiedenhof", with a statue of GGG Founder Isaak Iselin in the foreground

The Gesellschaft für das Gute und Gemeinnützige (GGG) is a private, non-profit organization founded in 1777 in Basel, Switzerland. Inspired by Enlightenment ideals, the GGG has played a significant role in the history of education and social welfare in Basel.

The GGG's name means "society for the good and the common benefit", but there appears to be no official English translation of the name. (The German word gemeinnützig is commonly associated with non-profit institutions.)

The modern GGG operates as an umbrella organization supporting dozens of groups with social or cultural service missions, including charitable foundations, libraries, social service agencies, and a boy choir. As of 2008, about 90 organizations with more than 3,000 staff members belonged to the GGG.

== History ==
The philosopher, historian, and educator Isaak Iselin is considered the principal founder of the GGG, which was established in 1777 as the Gesellschaft zur Aufmunterung und Beförderung des Guten und Gemeinnützigen. Its purpose was to alleviate widespread poverty in Basel and to promote progress and education for the underprivileged classes. Similar institutions had already been founded in other German-speaking cities, including Hamburg and Lübeck.

The association founded schools for girls and women, as well as kindergartens that were later taken over by the state government. It also provided gymnastics, swimming, and public instruction in music and arithmetic in Basel schools. In 1831 the GGG built the city's first swimming pool facility for men. It took part in establishing hospitals and institutions for the physically and mentally handicapped. The GGG was also heavily engaged in providing subsidized housing. It founded a savings bank and a non-profit life insurance association.

== Structure ==
There are three types of organizations in the GGG, respectively classified as A, B, and C organizations.

=== A-Organizations ===
These are entirely owned by the GGG and are each led by a commission appointed by the GGG directors. A-Organizations include the GGG libraries (GGG Stadtbibliothek Basel, formerly known as Allgemeine Bibliotheken der GGG Basel, or ABG) and the BENEVOL union for volunteer work.

=== B-Organizations ===
These are independent organizations that are substantially supported by the GGG, or for whom the GGG appoints a majority of the leading officials. B-Organizations include a fund for student housing, the Kinderfreund foundation, and the Lighthouse Basel foundation.

=== C-Organizations ===
These are independent organizations that are patronized by the GGG, and to whom the GGG appoints at least one delegate. C-Organizations include the Basel Boys Choir (Knabenkantorei Basel), an emergency helpline for parents (Elternnotruf), and an association concerned with Alzheimer's disease in both Basel half-cantons (Alzheimervereinigung beider Basel).
