= Salomon Hirzel (historian) =

Swiss historian (1727–1818)

- Born: 13 May 1727; Zurich, Old Swiss Confederacy
- Died: 19 November 1818 (aged 91); Zurich, Switzerland
- Occupations: Politician; historian
- Spouse: Anna Elisabetha Ulrich (m. 1755)
- Parents: Hans Caspar Hirzel (father); Regula Hirzel (mother)
- Relatives: Hans Caspar Hirzel (brother); Johannes Zellweger (brother-in-law)

Salomon Hirzel (13 May 1727 – 19 November 1818) was a Swiss politician and historian from Zurich. He became town clerk of Zurich in 1762 and its treasurer in 1785, and he was a co-founder of the Helvetic Society and of the Moral Society in Zurich. He was known as the author of the Zürcher Jahrbücher.

== Biography ==
Salomon Hirzel was born on 13 May 1727 in Zurich, the son of Hans Caspar Hirzel, Statthalter (deputy mayor), and Regula Hirzel. His brother was Hans Caspar Hirzel. In 1755 he married Anna Elisabetha Ulrich, daughter of Hans Caspar Ulrich, a guild master (Zunftmeister). His sister Anna married the merchant Johannes Zellweger of Trogen.

In 1762 Hirzel became town clerk (Stadtschreiber) of Zurich, in 1769 bailiff (Obervogt) of Horgen, and in 1785 treasurer (Seckelmeister) and a member of the Secret Council (Geheimer Rat).

Hirzel was a co-founder of the Helvetic Society and of the Moral Society (Moralische Gesellschaft) in Zurich. He pursued historical studies and was known as the author of the Zürcher Jahrbücher (Zurich annals). He died in Zurich on 19 November 1818.

== Bibliography ==
- K. Keller-Escher, Die Familie Hirzel von Zürich, 1899

=== Archives ===
- Zentralbibliothek Zürich, family archive (Familienarchiv)
