= Hans Caspar Hirzel =

Swiss writer

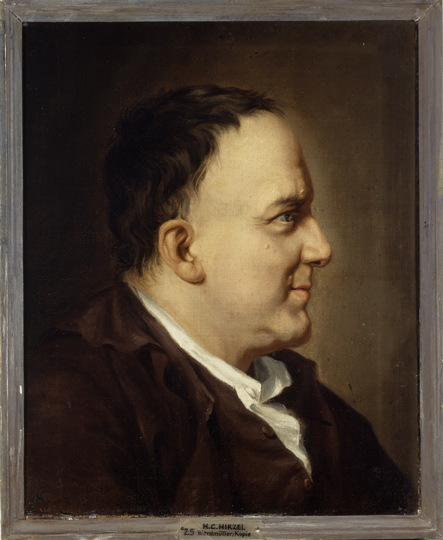
Hirzel (in 1787?)

Hans Caspar Hirzel (21 March 1725 - 18 February 1803), also known or spelt as - Herzil John Caspar, Kaspar Hirzel, Johann Kasper Herzel, or John Kaspar Hirzel, was a Swiss physician and writer on rural economy.

== Biography ==
Hirzel was born in Kappel am Albis in 1725 and adopted the medical profession by his learning and intelligence. He distinguished himself in lecturing on the theory and practice of medicine, including instructions to midwives. He was one of the principal founders of the Helvetic Society in 1762 along with Isaak Iselin, Salomon Gessner, and some 20 others.

== The Rural Socrates ==
He translated the works of Tissot into German. Subsequently, Hirzel published a treatise on rural economy first in German. This treatise was published in French under the title Le Socrate Rustique and in English under the title The Rural Socrates.

Hirzel was acquainted with a Swiss farmer, who was distinguished for his agriculture industry and skill. Hirzel was determined to publish the result of this man's agricultural occupation, including facts and observations from other sources. The British agriculturalist Arthur Young later published Hirzel's treatise in English, this translation was also sold in the United States.

Hirzel also authored some historical eulogies and dialogues on religion and tolerance. He died of apoplexy on 18 February 1803.
