= Charles Monnard =

Swiss historian (1790–1865)

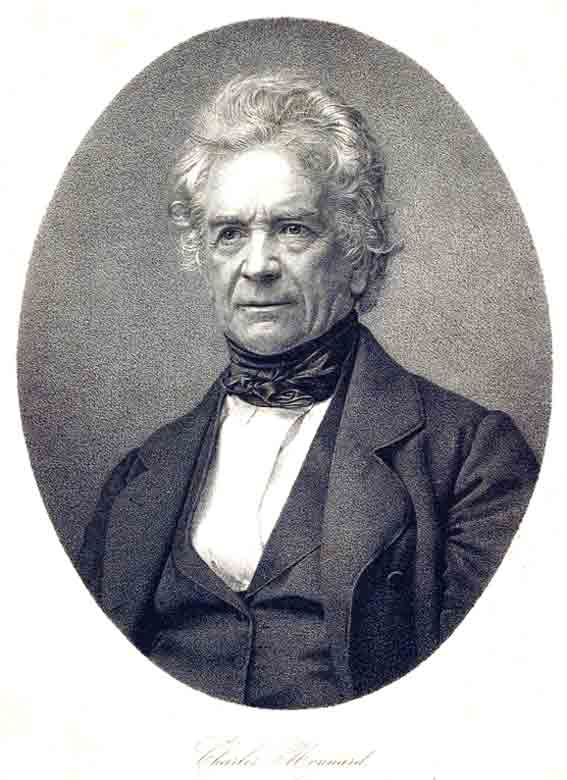
Charles Monnard

Charles Monnard (17 January 1790, in Bern – 13 January 1865, in Bonn) was a Swiss historian.

He studied theology in Lausanne, and from 1813 to 1816, worked as a tutor in Paris. From 1816 to 1845 he was a professor of French literature at the Academy of Lausanne. In 1847 he attained the chair of literature and Romance languages at the University of Bonn, a position he maintained up until his death.

He expanded to Romandy the national-historical movement in Swiss history that had been promoted by German-speaking Swiss historians such as Johannes von Müller and Heinrich Zschokke. He translated both men's works into French, and was one of several historians to work on a continuation of von Müller's Geschichten Schweizerischer Eidgenossenschaft. This work fit into the context of Monnard's liberal politics in the controversies of the time, opposing the attempts of the old elites to reestablish themselves.

Monnard was also a founding member of the Société d'histoire de la Suisse romande, and a member of the Helvetic Society after it was revived in 1819.
