= Defensionale =

Swiss defensive military alliances (16th–17th c.)

Defensionale was the term used in the Old Swiss Confederacy for the defensive military alliances concluded between the cantons in the second half of the 16th century and in the 17th century to defend the Confederation; the body of such agreements is also referred to as the Defensionalordnungen (French: défensionaux). They supplemented the outdated provisions of the late-medieval confederation and included clauses obliging the cantons to provide one another with mutual assistance, playing a considerable role in the history of the cantonal militias and of Swiss neutrality.

== History ==
The first such alliances were concluded in the second half of the 16th century among the Protestant cantons, in response to the Counter-Reformation. During the Thirty Years' War, the confessionally divided cantons drew closer together in an effort to have their neutrality accepted abroad. These first agreements were of short duration and were not signed by all the cantons. In the face of threats from imperial troops, the first confederation-wide measures were taken to protect the frontier in Thurgau, which proved decisive for the further development of the Defensionale. After the violation of the frontier near Basel by Duke Bernhard of Saxe-Weimar, the thirteen cantons declared in 1638 in favor of armed neutrality and shortly afterward reopened negotiations on the reorganization of the defense system.

In view of renewed French and Swedish attacks in the Lake Constance region, the war council met at Wil in 1647 and concluded a federal Defensionale for the protection of Thurgau. Approved by the Diet, it contained clauses on the levying, organization, and arming of troops. Although it addressed a specific threat, after the Peace of Westphalia it served as the basis for later measures.

The Ottoman wars of conquest in eastern Europe led to a renewal of the mutual obligations in 1664. After the French occupation of the Franche-Comté in 1668, the Defensionale of Baden—the first genuinely national military legislation of the Confederation—was concluded in 1673 by sixteen cantons and allied territories. Read out each year at the Diet, it could be adapted to new dangers or threats, and the war council was given wide-ranging powers, including political ones. The Defensionale remained in force only briefly because of confessional disputes: the Catholic cantons, with the exception of Lucerne, renounced it between 1676 and 1703. At the outbreak of the War of the First Coalition, the Defensionale of Baden was sworn for the first and last time by all the cantons at the Diet of May 1792. Under the Restoration, it formed the basis of the federal military regulation of 1817, which lasted until 1848, and in its essentials until 1874.

== Bibliography ==
- G. Grosjean, Berns Anteil am evangelischen und eidgenössischen Defensionale im 17. Jahrhundert, 1953
- Bonjour, Neutralität, 1
- J. Stüssi-Lauterburg, "Das Defensionale von Wil (1647)", in 1648, Die Schweiz und Europa, ed. M. Jorio, 1999, 147–173
