= Abraham Ruchat =

Swiss Protestant theologian and historian

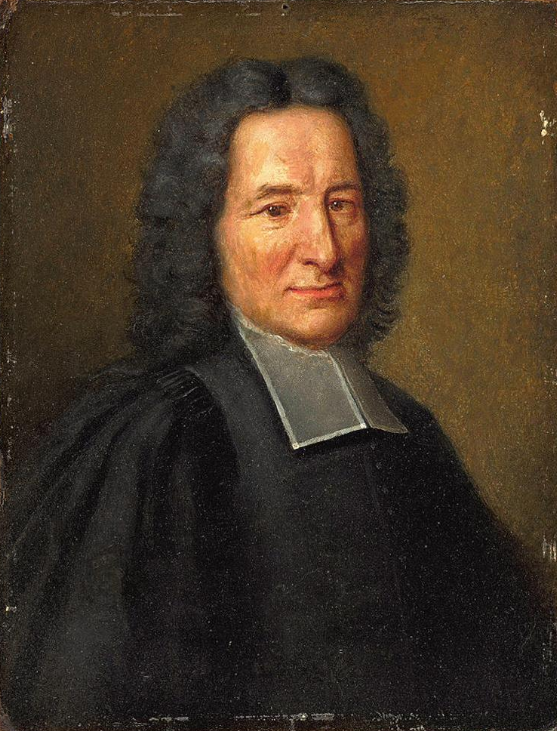
Anonymous portrait, c. 1730–1740

Abraham Ruchat (baptized 27 February 1680 – 29 September 1750) was a Swiss Protestant pastor, theologian and historian.

== Biography ==
Originally from Grandcour, Ruchat was born in Vevey, Vaud, as the son of Jacques Ruchat and Jeanne Marie Dubois. He began studying theology at the Academy of Lausanne in 1693, receiving his ordination in 1702. Ruchat lived in Bern and studied in Berlin and Leiden between 1704 and 1709. He served as pastor of Aubonne from 1709 to 1716 and of Rolle from 1716 to 1721. In 1721, Ruchat was appointed professor of rhetoric at the Academy of Lausanne, where from 1733 up until his death, he taught classes in theology. He served as the academy's rector from 1736 to 1739.

In 1727–28, Ruchat published several volumes on the Swiss Reformation, titled Histoire de la Réformation de la Suisse — in 1835–38 the work was published in its entirety by Louis Vulliemin (7 volumes). It was later translated into English and published with the title History of the Reformation in Switzerland (1845). In 1714, under the pseudonym "Gottlieb Kypseler", he published a guide for foreigners, Les Délices de la Suisse ("The Delights of Switzerland"; 4 volumes). Another noted work by Ruchat was Abrégé de l'histoire ecclésiastique du Pays de Vaud ("Abstract on the ecclesiastical history of the land of Vaud"; 1707).

With Louis Bourguet, Charles Guillaume Loys de Bochat and Gabriel Cramer, he was editor of the journal Bibliothèque italique, ou, Histoire littéraire de l'Italie. Ruchat died in Lausanne on 29 September 1750, aged 70.
