= Salomon Gessner =

Swiss painter and poet (1730–1788)

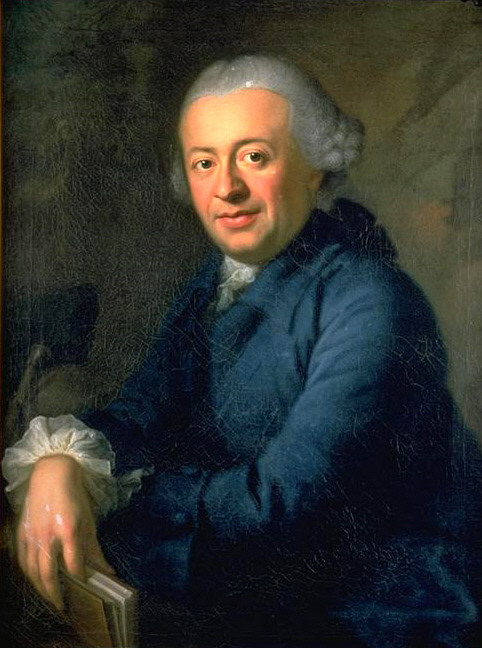
- Portrait by Anton Graff (1765/66)
- Born: April 1, 1730; Zurich
- Died: March 2, 1788 (aged 57); Zürich
- Known for: Painting; Poetry
- Notable work: Idyllen (1756)

Salomon Gessner (1 April 1730 – 2 March 1788) was a Swiss painter, graphic artist, government official, newspaper publisher, and poet, best known in the latter instance for his Idylls. He was a co-founder of the Helvetic Society and the first publisher and editor of the Neue Zürcher Zeitung.

== Biography ==
His father, Hans Konrad Gessner (1696–1775), was a printer, publisher, bookseller and member of the High Council of Zürich. From the age of six until his death, he lived in a home his father bought, at Münstergasse 9. He began an apprenticeship in 1749, at a bookshop in Berlin, but stayed for only a year, having decided to devote himself to landscape painting and etching. After a short stay in Hamburg, where he encountered the poetic works of Karl Wilhelm Ramler and Friedrich von Hagedorn, he also developed an interest in poetry.

He returned home, without definite plans, but felt uninclined to take part in his father's business. Instead, he joined a group of young men, known as the Dienstags-Compagnie, that met for discussions and social activities at the homes of their parents (in winter) or at a vineyard clubhouse in Selnau. There, they became enraptured by "Naturschwärmerei" (nature enthusiasm or enchantment) and fancied themselves to be ancient shepherds.

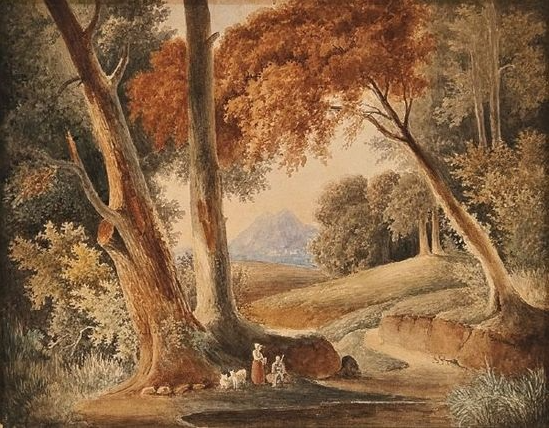
Wooded Landscape with Figures

His first published poem was Lied eines Schweizers an sein bewaffnetes Mädchen and his first painting was Die Nacht (1753). His next, longer poem, Daphnis (1754), was inspired by a translation of Longus by Jacques Amyot. The first edition of what would become his best known work, Idyllen, appeared in 1756 and a volume of collected works was issued in 1762. From then until 1772, he concentrated on painting.

In 1760, he was a co-founder of the Helvetic Society. (Note: Sources disagree on the year: Gessner's HDS biography gives 1760, while the HDS biography of Hans Caspar Hirzel dates the founding to 1762.) In 1761, against fierce opposition, he married Judith Heidegger (1736–1818), the daughter of one of his father's competitors. A year later, his daughter, Dorothea, was born. In 1763, he became a partner and the artistic director of the Porzellanmanufaktur Kilchberg-Schooren. A son, Konrad, was born in 1764.

In 1765, he was elected to represent the porcelain guild on the Zürich High Council. Three years later, he won election as an Obervogt (supervisor) for the Territoriale Entwicklung Zürichs, in charge of Erlenbach, and his son Heinrich was born. After 1776, he held the same office for Wipkingen.

In 1780, he began publishing and editing the Zürcher Zeitung, which became the Neue Zürcher Zeitung in 1821. From 1781 until his death, he held the title of "Sihlherr", the senior administrator of Sihlwald, and was responsible for supplying firewood to Zürich. He spent the summers there, at a cabin in the forest.

In 1792/93, the Gessner Monument was erected in Platzspitz park. It was designed by Alexander Trippel and was one of the first patriotic monuments in Switzerland. Another monument dedicated to him in Bad Dürkheim was destroyed by the French in 1794. A commemorative plaque has been placed on his lifelong home. Several streets and a bridge have been named after him.

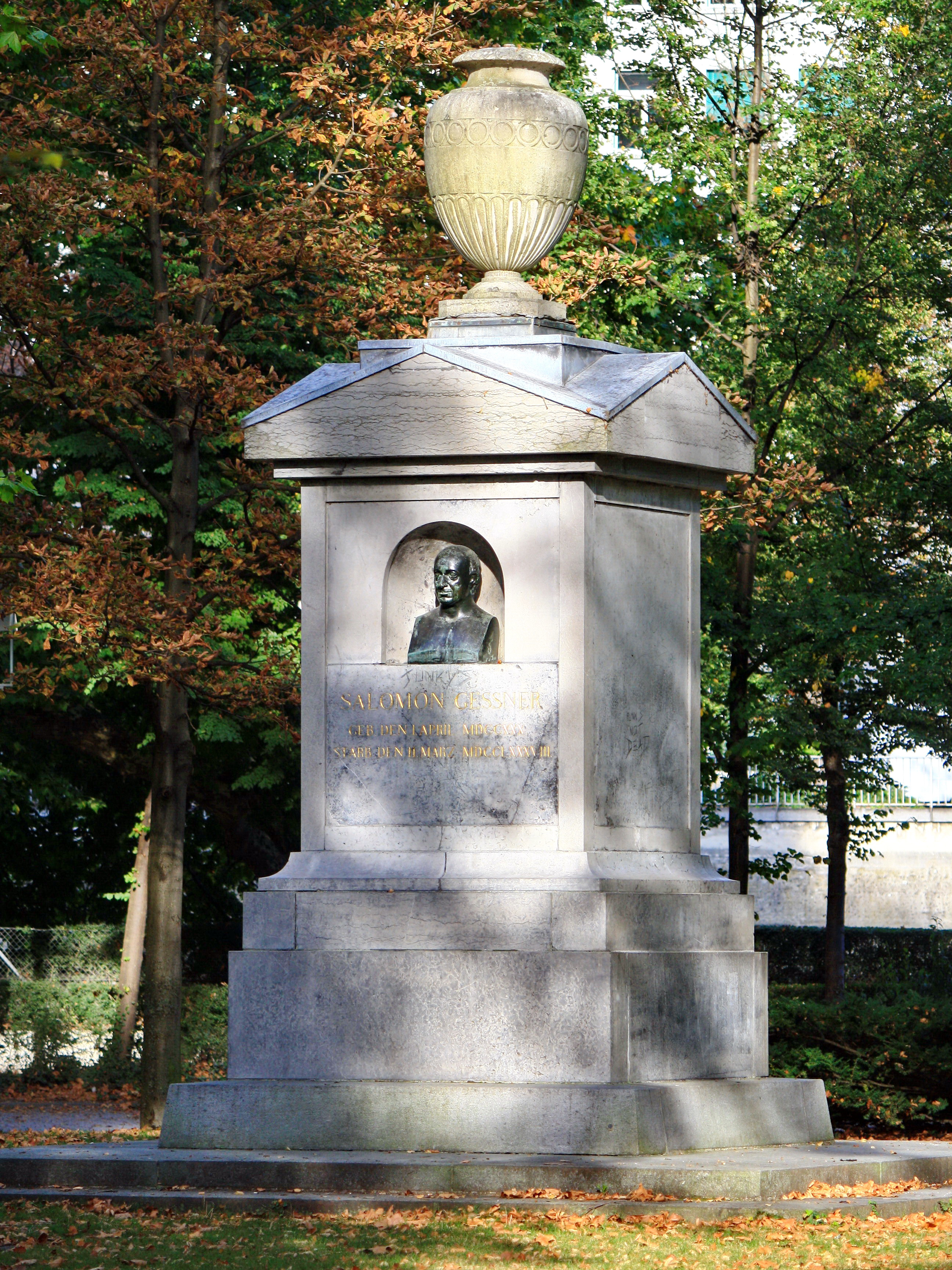
The Gessner Monument

== Works ==
- Idyllen. Gessner, Zürich 1756. (Digitalized copy, online @ the Deutsches Textarchiv)
- In 1776, George Robinson in London published an English translation of Gessner's work as New Idylles.
- His collected works were self-published in Zürich from 1777 to 1778. (2 volumes, Digitalisate, by the Landesbibliothek Oldenburg). They were translated into French, published in Paris (1786–1793), and Amsterdam (1784) 3 volumes. Juliane Giovane translated the Idyllen into Italian.
- The German edition was reissued in Leipzig in 1841. His Briefwechsel mit seinem Sohn appeared in Bern and Zürich in 1801. Juliane Giovane translated the Idyllen into Italian.
