= Isaak Iselin =

Swiss philosopher

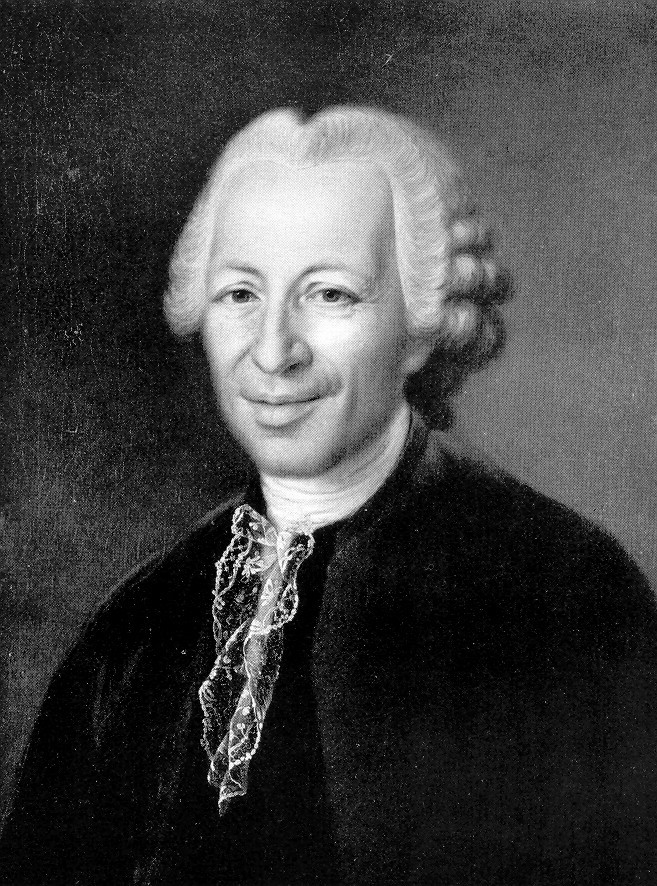
Isaak Iselin

Isaak Iselin (7 March 1728 in Basel – 15 July 1782 in Basel) was a Swiss philosopher of history and politics.

His family was an "old business family" in Basel. Iselin studied law and philosophy at the University of Basel and the University of Göttingen. He unsuccessfully tried to become a professor in Basel.

In 1756 he became secretary of the republic of Basel. He was a co-founder of the Helvetic Society, the first national Swiss reform society.

Iselin's Geschichte der Menschheit ("History of Humanity") was the first fully-fledged history of humanity in German. The Geschichte der Menschheit was provoked by what Iselin conceived as Montesquieu's climatological determinism and Rousseau's critique of progress and at the same time inspired by exponents of the Scottish Enlightenment such as Lord Kames. Iselin's pen-friend Moses Mendelssohn in his review of the first edition of 1764, lauded Iselin as one of the best German prose writers.

== Works ==
- Philosophische und Politische Versuche, 1760
- Ueber die Geschichte der Menschheit, 1764
- Versuch über die gesellige Ordnung, 1772
- Träume eines Menschenfreundes, 1776

== Recent edition of Iselin's works ==
- Gesammelte Schriften. Kommentierte Ausgabe. Schwabe Verlag, Basel 2014–2018.
  - volume 1: Schriften zur Politik, ed. by Florian Gelzer, 2014, ISBN 978-3-7965-3339-6.
  - volume 2: Schriften zur Ökonomie, ed. by Lina Weber, 2016, ISBN 978-3-7965-3442-3.
  - volume 3: Schriften zur Pädagogik, ed. by Marcel Naas, 2014, ISBN 978-3-7965-3340-2.
  - volume 4: Geschichte der Menschheit, ed. by Sundar Henny, 2018, ISBN 978-3-7965-3497-3 (open access).

== See also ==
- Gesellschaft für das Gute und Gemeinnützige
