= Helvetic Society =

Swiss patriotic reform society

The Helvetische Gesellschaft / Société Helvétique, or Helvetic Society as it is known in English, was a patriotic society and the first Swiss reform society. It was founded by Swiss philosopher Isaak Iselin, poet Solomon Gessner and some 20 others on 15 May 1762, and was dissolved with the formation of the Helvetic Republic in 1798. It was revived again from 1819 on until 1849. The latter should not be confused with the contemporary Helvetic Society for the Natural Sciences, established in 1815.

== History ==
The Helvetic Society was the first patriotic society in Switzerland aimed at all Swiss people. It was inspired by Franz Urs Balthasar's Patriotische Träume eines Eidgenossen von einem Mittel, die veraltete Eidgenosenschaft wieder zu verjüngen, an essay from 1758 which was distributed in manuscript form and was discussed by Joseph Anton Felix von Balthasar (son of the author), Iselin, Gessner and Hans Caspar Hirzel.

After two years of discussion, and a change of scope from an historical society to a more socially directed one, the Society first met with 9 members in 1761, and was eventually formed on 15 May 1762 in Schinznach-Dorf, with statutes by Hirzel, with 25 initial members. While it had an open membership structure and advocated religious harmony, very few Catholics joined, and the members were predominantly German-speaking. The society tried to be more than just a philosophical debate club like most other similar European societies, and also organised social activities, and a yearly autumn meeting from 1763 on, first in Schitznach, and from 1780 on in Olten, and finally in Aarau. New statutes were approved in 1766, focusing on the inclusiveness of the society towards all Swiss from all cantons. The aims of the Society included a democratic reform of the Swiss constitution, and education for all, influenced by the ideas of Jean-Jacques Rousseau as expressed in Emile: or, On Education. The pedagogic reformer Johann Heinrich Pestalozzi was an early member of the Society. He was one of the contributors for the Society's magazine Der Erinnerer, established in 1765, but it was soon suppressed for being too radical and critical of the authorities.

The 1766 statutes listed as the aim of the Society "The only goal and unique object of our Society must be to establish and conserve between the Swiss love and friendship, unity and concord; to maintain among them the taste for beautiful, noble and great acts; and to transmit for posterity liberty, peace and virtue through the care of good citizens".

After a halting start, with a membership that stayed at around 80 until 1770, the society flourished, with 159 members by 1780 and 283 by 1797, with a steady rise in visitors as well, like some members of the Bernoulli family in 1763. Among the new members were a lot of cantonal magistrates and other members of the Swiss elite. Of the 386 members the society had between 1762 and 1798, some 90 percent held a political office at some time.

In 1798, instead of an annual meeting, the members of the Helvetic Society started with the creation of the legislative assembly for the new Helvetic Republic, providing many members. The Society was abandoned, and was revived in 1819. The second version of the Society existed until 1849, when the society had become superfluous when most of its ideas were included in the new Swiss Federal Constitution of 1848.

== Members ==
- Franz Urs Balthasar (1762, honorary member)
- Joseph Anton Felix von Balthasar (1762)
- Urs Glutz von Blotzheim
- Johann Kaspar Bluntschli
- Johann Jakob Bodmer
- Charles Victor de Bonstetten
- Johann Jakob Breitinger
- Jacques Clavel de Brenles (1765)
- Johann Rudolf Forcart (1773)
- Solomon Gessner (1762)
- Wilhelm Haas-Münch
- Salomon Hirzel (1762)
- Isaak Iselin (1762, first president)
- Johann Kaspar Lavater (1765)
- Christian von Mechel
- Joseph Rudolf Valentin Meyer (1762)
- Johann Heinrich Pestalozzi
- Gottlieb Konrad Pfeffel (1776, president in 1785)
- Jacob Sarasin
- Johann Heinrich Schinz (1762)
- Johann Georg Stokar (president in 1777)
- Johann Rudolf Tschiffeli (1762)
- Louis Eugene, Duke of Württemberg (1765, honorary member)

== Members (post 1819) ==
- Charles Monnard (1819)
- Johann Heinrich Pestalozzi (president in 1826)
- Ignaz Paul Vital Troxler
- Heinrich Zschokke (president, 1820s)
