= Abraham Davel =

Swiss soldier

Jean Daniel Abraham Davel
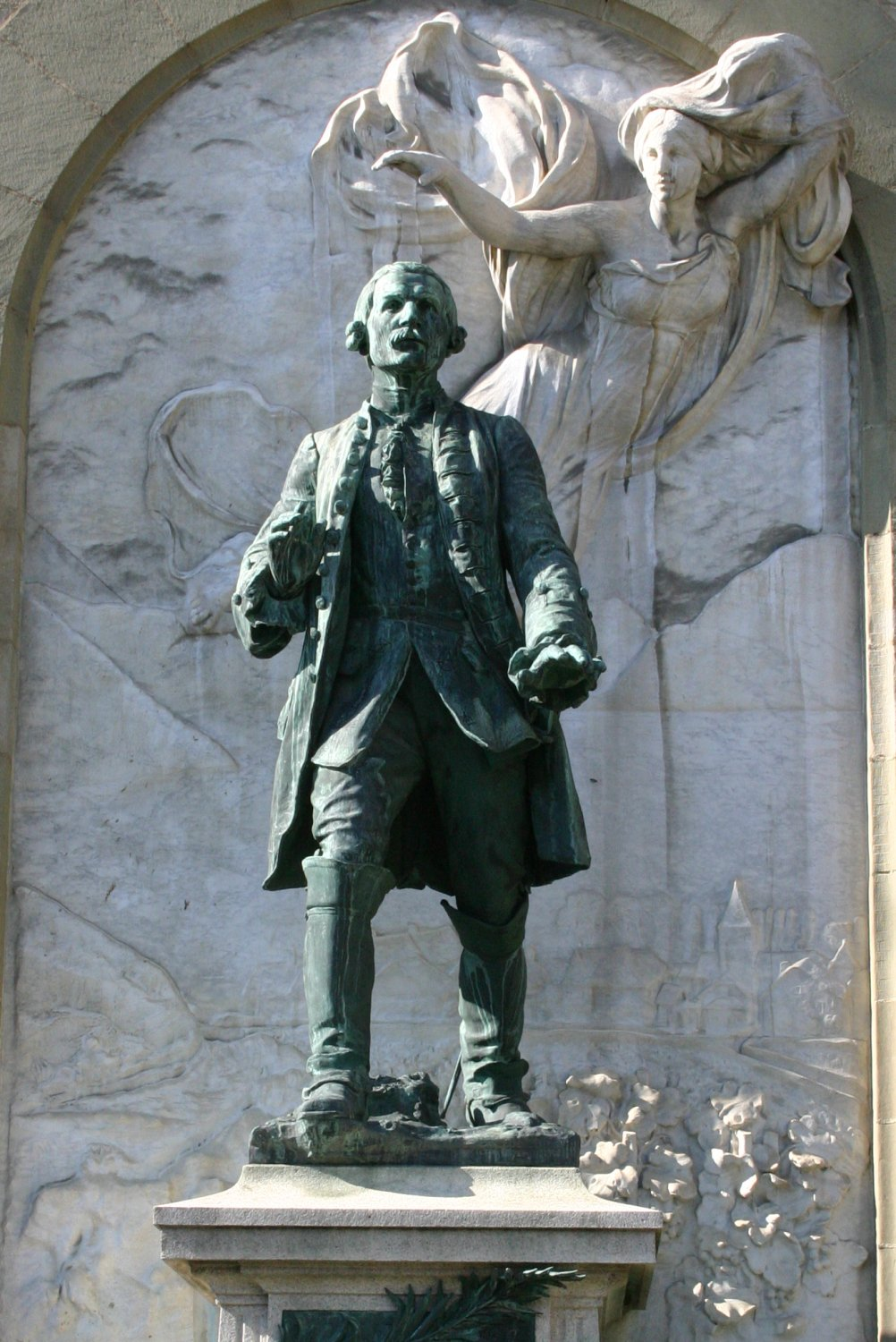
- The statue of Major Davel in front of the Château Saint-Maire in Lausanne
- Born: 20 October 1670; Morrens, Swiss Confederacy
- Died: 24 April 1723 (aged 52); Lausanne, Swiss Confederacy
- Education: University of Lausanne
- Occupations: Notary, soldier
- Known for: First martyr of the independence of Vaud

Jean Daniel Abraham Davel (20 October 1670 - 24 April 1723), known as Major Davel, was a Swiss soldier and patriot of Vaud. He was sentenced to death and beheaded for calling for Vaud's independence from the Bern authorities.

== Early life and military career ==
The son of a Protestant minister, Jean Daniel Abraham Davel studied in Lausanne, where his family moved after the death of his father in 1676. In 1688 he began his career as a notary, and also worked as land commissioner in the neighbouring town of Cully. He started his military career in 1692 in the service of Prince Eugene of Savoy and John Churchill. Back in the Confederacy, he participated alongside the Bernese in the second Villmergen War of 1712. After the victory of the Protestant alliance, Davel settled in Vaud where he resumed judicial office. In 1717, he was given a sizeable pension and appointed to the rank of Major by the Bernese, and received the command of the Vaud militia of the district of Lavaux.

== Rebellion ==
In the face of Vaudois resistance to the introduction of the Helvetic Consensus, Davel had felt himself to be called since 1691 by what he called La belle inconnue ("the beautiful unknown woman") to liberate his country from the arrogance and tyranny of Bern. On 31 March 1723, pretexting a military parade for the Easter week, he entered Lausanne in the company of 600 troops at a moment when the Bernese bailiffs were absent. Leaving his men to guard the cathedral, he walked alone to the city hall and assembled the municipal council to present them with a manifesto in which a number of failures and abuses were levelled at the government. The council asked for a delay and immediately reported the incident to Bern. Davel was arrested on 1 April and imprisoned in Saint-Maire Castle. Interrogated five times, tortured twice, he maintained that his undertaking was suggested directly by God and that he had no accomplices. He was sentenced to death by the court of citizens, in Lausanne, and was beheaded on 24 April at Vidy.

== Legacy ==
Initially derided as crazy, Davel became a martyr of Vaudois independence after his rehabilitation by Juste Olivier first and then Frédéric-César de La Harpe in the mid-18th century. Today the Vaud section of the Swiss fraternity, Zofingia, commemorates the sacrifice of Major Davel every 24 April, in a procession following his route on that day in 1723, leaving from the Château Saint-Maire in Lausanne and leading up to the monument at Vidy, the site of his execution. A stele was erected in Louis Bourget Park at the place where the scaffold was placed. It bears the following inscription: "Here Davel gave his life for his country, 24 April 1723".

A series of streets are named in his honor: "rue du Major Davel" in Baulmes, "rue Davel" in Cully, "avenue Davel" ("avenue Jean-Daniel-Abram-Davel") in Lausanne, "chemin du Major Davel" in Morrens, "chemin Davel" in Pully, "rue Davel" in Riex, "avenue du Major-Davel" in Vevey.

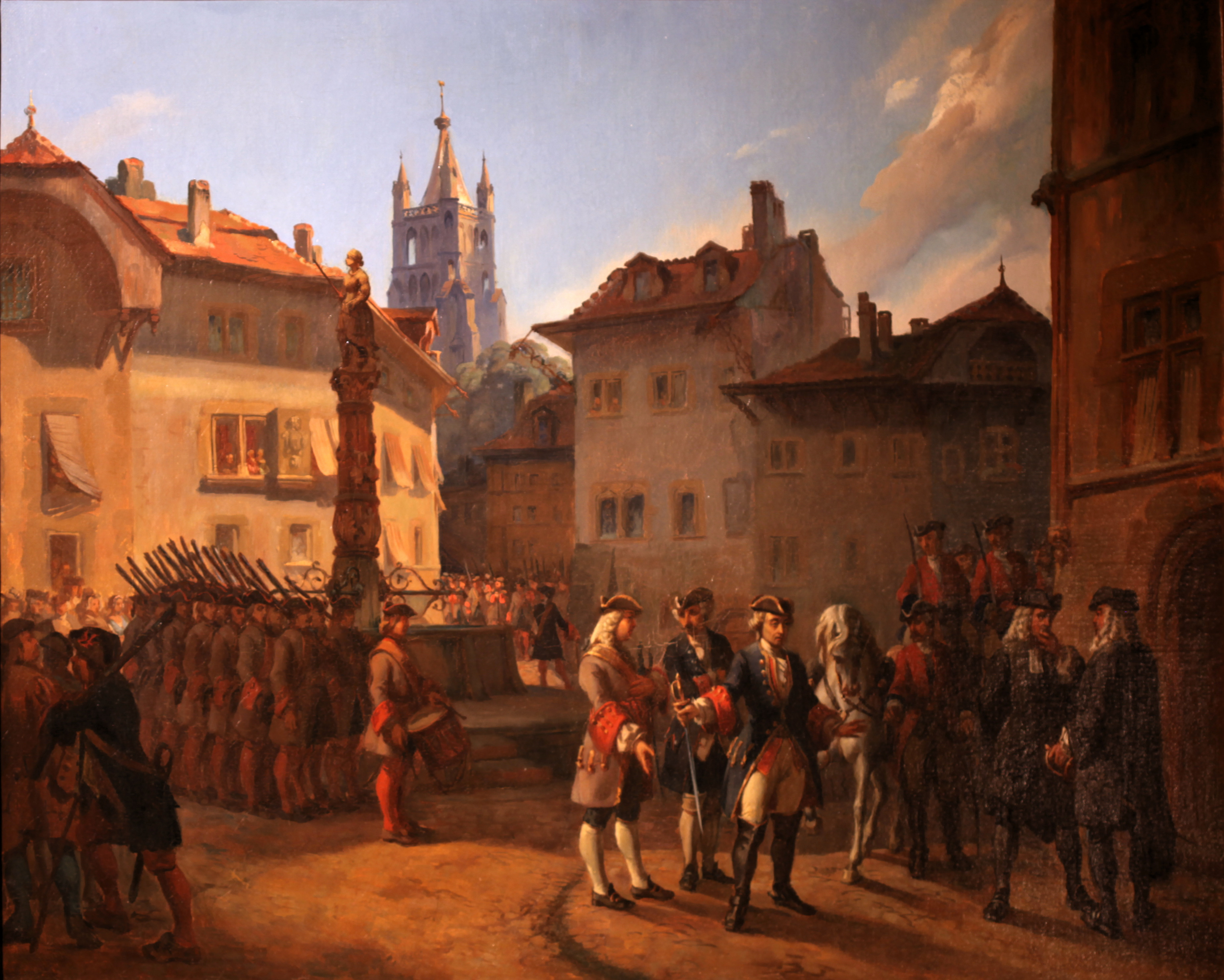
The arrest of Major Davel, by François Bonnet

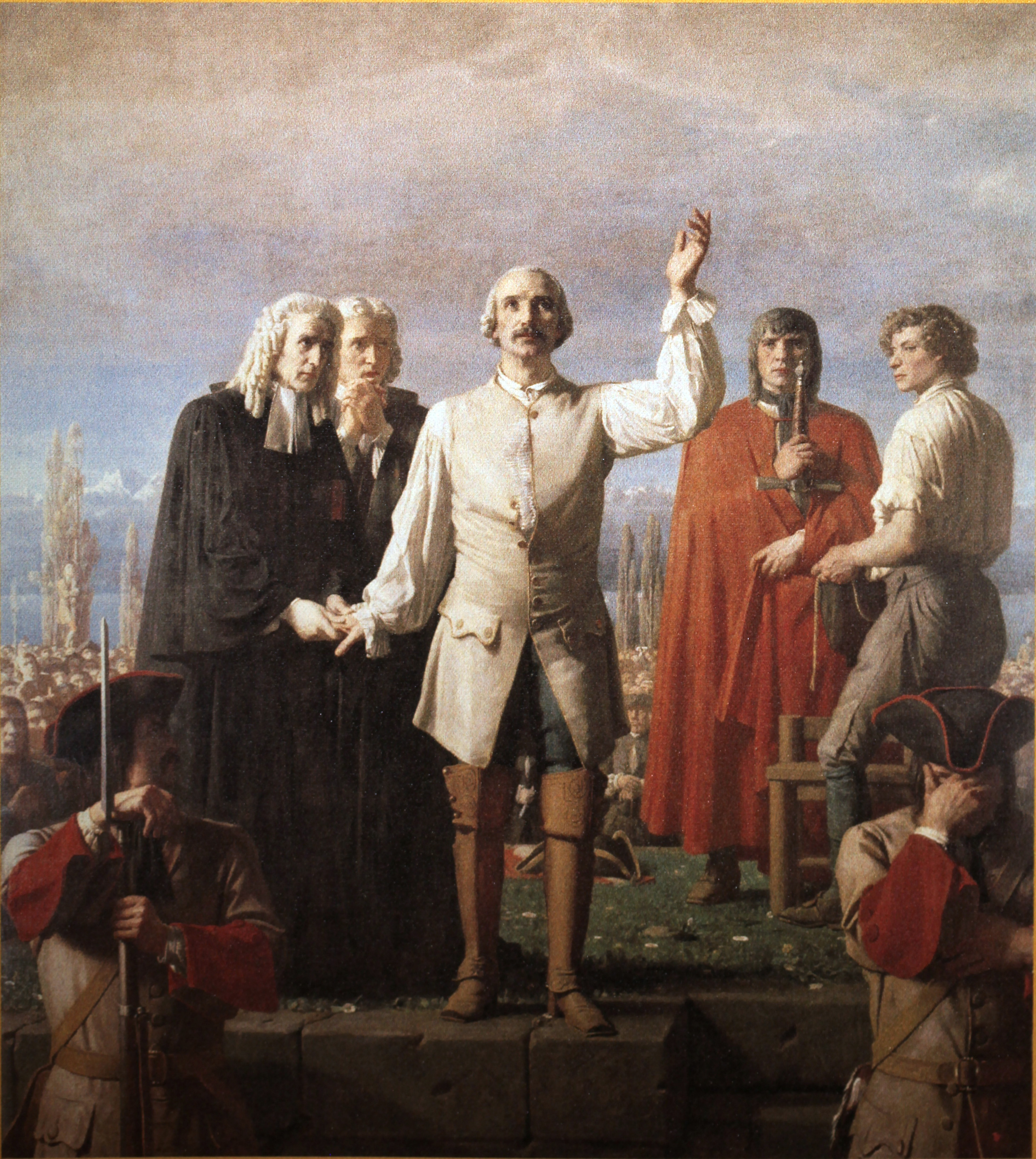
The execution of Davel by Charles Gleyre

== See also ==
- Frédéric-César de La Harpe

== Bibliographie ==
- Gilbert Coutaz, Le Major Davel. Naissance du premier patriote vaudois, Orbe-Yverdon, 2022, 256 p.
