= Swiss Insurance Association =

Swiss insurance industry organisation

The Swiss Insurance Association (SIA) represents the interests of the private insurance industry at the national level in Switzerland.

== Aims ==
Swiss private insurers are of economic importance. They assume and cover companies' and private individuals financial risks. The association is committed to ensuring an economically viable and sustainable framework for these activities. It works to maintain and promote a liberal and socially acceptable market and competitive system.

The SIA is active in the following fields:

- social security (occupational pensions, life insurance)
- medical insurance, accident insurance
- insurance law and supervision
- competition and regulation
- economic and fiscal policy
- climate and environment protection
- health promotion activities
- education and training

== Governance ==
=== Members ===
The Swiss Insurance Association (SIA) is the industry association for Swiss private insurers. With approximately 70 members – including global primary insurers and reinsurers as well as nationally oriented specialist property, life and supplementary health insurers – the association represents over 95 per cent of the insurance premiums generated in Switzerland. The SIA is committed to the insurance industry’s sustainable development and promotes solutions that contribute to the stability and security of the Swiss economy and society. As such, the private insurance industry makes a significant contribution to prosperity within Switzerland. The sector is one of the most productive and highest value-creating economic sectors in the country and employs roughly 50,000 employees. 2025 sees the SIA celebrate its 125th anniversary.

=== Structure ===
The SIA is an association ("Verein") in accordance with article 60ss. of the Swiss Civil Code. Its main bodies are elected by the general assembly. The Managing Board sets the objectives and establishes the strategy of the SIA; it also monitors the activities of the head office. Committees and commissions, consisting of highly qualified representatives of the membership, are in charge of drafting solutions in the interest of the entire insurance industry. The SIA head office is divided into the three divisions "Insurance Strategy and Regulation", "Public Affairs and Communications" and "Directorate".

=== Supervisory authority ===
The member companies of the SIA are subject to supervision by the Swiss Financial Market Supervisory Authority (FINMA). Compulsory basic health insurance, the Swiss Accident Insurance Institution SUVA, the cantonal buildings insurers and the autonomous pension funds are not considered private insurers. FINMA is in charge of client protection and monitors the insurers’ ability to continuously meet their contractual obligations. The SIA shares the general interest in a strong and competent regulator.

=== Memberships ===
The SIA is a member of national and international associations and organisations. It represents its members’ interests and concerns namely vis-à-vis economiesuisse, the Swiss Employers Confederation and the Swiss Chamber of Commerce. Its membership in the European (re)insurance federation Insurance Europe and the Global Federation of Insurance Associations GFIA are of particular relevance.

== History ==
The SIA's predecessor – the "Verband concessionierter schweizerischer Versicherungs-Gesellschaften" – was founded in December 1900 as a section of the Swiss Federation of Commerce and Industry, to prevent compulsory accident insurance from being concentrated in a state institution and to defend the position of the primary insurance and reinsurance sector. It has had its present name since 1978. The life insurers had organized from 1891, following the introduction of the federal insurance act of 1885, and Gottfried Georg Schaertlin, director of the Rentenanstalt and a leading figure of the Conference of Directors of Swiss Life Insurance Companies, was the association's first president, from 1901 to 1937. The founding was also linked to the political debate on federal health and accident insurance: a first draft, the lex Forrer, which provided for the nationalization of the accident insurance companies, had been rejected in a popular vote in May 1900. The founding members were the directors of 21 Swiss insurance companies, among them the Rentenanstalt (Swiss Life from 2002), Bâloise, the Swiss Reinsurance Company, Helvetia, La Mobilière, the Swiss Accident Insurance Company (Winterthur Insurance from 1975) and the Zürich Allgemeine Unfall- und Haftpflicht-Versicherungs-Aktiengesellschaft (later Zurich Insurance).

Before the First World War, the association helped draw up the Federal Act on Insurance Contracts of 1908, which came into force in 1910. It defended the interests of the Swiss companies in a domestic market in which foreign groups held strong positions, with 43% of total premiums in 1886 and still 34% in 1913, and a total of 78 foreign companies against only 28 Swiss ones. The inflation and currency turmoil that followed the war weakened the foreign companies and strengthened the association's members. In 1936, 43 Swiss insurance companies held 98% of the premiums generated in Switzerland, while 27 foreign companies shared the rest. The Swiss companies were also very active on international markets, where they already earned two thirds of their premium volume.

From the interwar period, alongside the association and the Conference of Directors of Swiss Life Insurance Companies, separate associations brought together the companies specializing in transport insurance (1921), accident insurance (1922), glass breakage (1925), and water damage and fire insurance (1932). Compared with these sector associations, the association had very limited means and played a secondary role. It was the conference of the life insurers' directors, not the association, that closely followed the drafting and legislation of old-age provision during the first debates on old-age and survivors' insurance (AHV/AVS) from the 1920s. The life insurers also contributed to the development of pension funds and accepted the introduction of the AHV in 1947, whose low pensions favored the growth of private old-age provision.

After the Second World War, new associations of the health insurers (1952) and of the foreign insurance companies present in the Swiss market (1960) were formed outside the association. In 1960 it joined the Central Union of Swiss Employers' Organizations, and the presidents of the associations of the main insurance branches (life, accident, fire and transport) joined the union's board. Until 1962 the association was always chaired by the director of a Zurich insurance company; in all, 10 of the 18 presidents elected between 1900 and 2023 came from the Zurich insurance center. It was strengthened by an information office set up in Bern in 1961 to coordinate the sector's public relations and run information and awareness campaigns, by a central secretariat set up in Zurich in 1968, and by an ombudsman's office opened in 1972.

In Switzerland, the association worked on insurance technique, contracts and vocational training. It had close contacts with the Federal Insurance Office, founded in 1886, which became the Federal Office of Private Insurance in 1978 and was merged into the Swiss Financial Market Supervisory Authority (FINMA) in 2009. It closely followed the granting of licenses to foreign insurance companies and contributed to cartel agreements, notably on premium levels, among the main insurance companies in the Swiss market. The association monitored the development of social insurance and helped defend the positions of private insurance in accident insurance, where the market for occupational accident insurance was reopened to private companies in 1984, and in health insurance, where compulsory coverage was introduced in 1996. In old-age provision, the anchoring of the three-pillar system in the Federal Constitution in 1972, which prevailed over the popular initiative of the Swiss Party of Labour "for a real people's pension", and the federal act on occupational pensions (BVG/LPP) of 1985 served the interests of the insurance companies by favoring private solutions for pension funds. At the beginning of the 21st century, the life insurers and the association were criticized by the left over the distribution of pension fund surpluses. These controversies, the debate on the Rentenklau ("pension theft"), did not fundamentally change the fact that old-age provision remained a major market for the life insurance sector.

Internationally, the association joined the European Insurance Committee (Insurance Europe from 2012) in 1953 and took an early interest in the development of the European insurance market. After the Single European Act of 1986, it campaigned for an agreement on direct insurance with the European Community. Although Switzerland did not join the European Economic Area in 1992, the association took part in European and international initiatives to liberalize the insurance sector, notably the Solvency I and II directives, which came into force in 2002 and 2016. It also accompanied the strong growth of the sector and the structural changes that came with the end of the cartel agreements, the development of multi-line insurance groups and the attempts to bring banks and insurers together in bancassurance. These changes led in 1997 to the merger of the association with the sector-specific insurance associations (life, health and accident, and property and reinsurance) and to a single central secretariat. After this refounding, the association's 80 members (about 70 in 2025) employed more than 50,000 people, a fifth of the workforce of the financial sector, and accounted for almost 40% of the sector's gross value added. The companies it represented were less affected than the banks by the financial crisis of 2007–2008, while covering the risks linked to global warming has become one of the major challenges for the insurance and reinsurance sector.

=== Presidents ===
Presidents of the association
President	Company	Term
Gottfried Georg Schaertlin	Rentenanstalt	1901–1937
Robert Mathias Naef	Zurich Insurance	1937–1943
Heinrich Fehlmann	Swiss Accident Insurance Company	1943–1950
Otto Müller	Swiss Accident Insurance Company	1950–1952
Carl Briner	La Suisse Compagnie Anonyme d'Assurances Générales	1952–1961
Raymond Devrient	La Suisse Assurances	1962–1967
Jon Pinösch	Bâloise	1967–1973
Paul Aerni	Swiss Accident Insurance Company / Winterthur Insurance	1973–1979
Walter Diehl	Swiss Reinsurance Company	1979–1985
Fritz Theo Hefti	Helvetia Fire Insurance / Helvetia Insurance	1985–1991
Rolf Schäuble	Bâloise	1991–1994
Riccardo L. Jagmetti	Rentenanstalt	1995–2000
Hansjörg Frei	Winterthur Insurance	2000–2003
Albert Lauper	La Mobilière	2003–2007
Erich Walser	Helvetia Insurance	2007–2011
Urs Berger	La Mobilière	2011–2017
Rolf Dörig	Swiss Life	2017–2023
Stefan Mäder	La Mobilière	2023–
