= Borgeaud =

Borgeaud is a surname. Notable people with the surname include:

- Charles Borgeaud (1861–1940), Swiss historican and writer
- Marius Borgeaud (1861–1924), Swiss painter
- Henri Borgeaud (1895–1964), French–Swiss politician
- Georges Borgeaud (painter) (1913–1998), Swiss painter
- Georges Borgeaud (1914–1998), Swiss writer and publisher
- Nelly Borgeaud (1931–2004), French film actress
- Pierre Borgeaud (1934–2019), Swiss business executive
- Bernard Borgeaud (born 1945), Swiss artist
- Pierre-Yves Borgeaud (born 1963), Swiss film director

== See also ==
- Bourgeat
