= Homberger =

Homberger is a surname. Notable people with the surname include:

- Alex Homberger (1912–2007), Swiss rower
- Daniel Homberger (born 1955), Swiss rower
- Dominique G. Homberger (born 1948), American zoologist
- Ernst Homberger (1869–1955), Swiss industrialist
- Esther Fischer-Homberger (1940–2019), Swiss psychiatrist and medical historian
- Hans Homberger (1908–1986), Swiss rower
- Heinrich Homberger (1896–1985), Swiss business federation director
- Rudolf Homberger (1910–?), Swiss rower
