= Eric Honegger =

Swiss politician and businessman

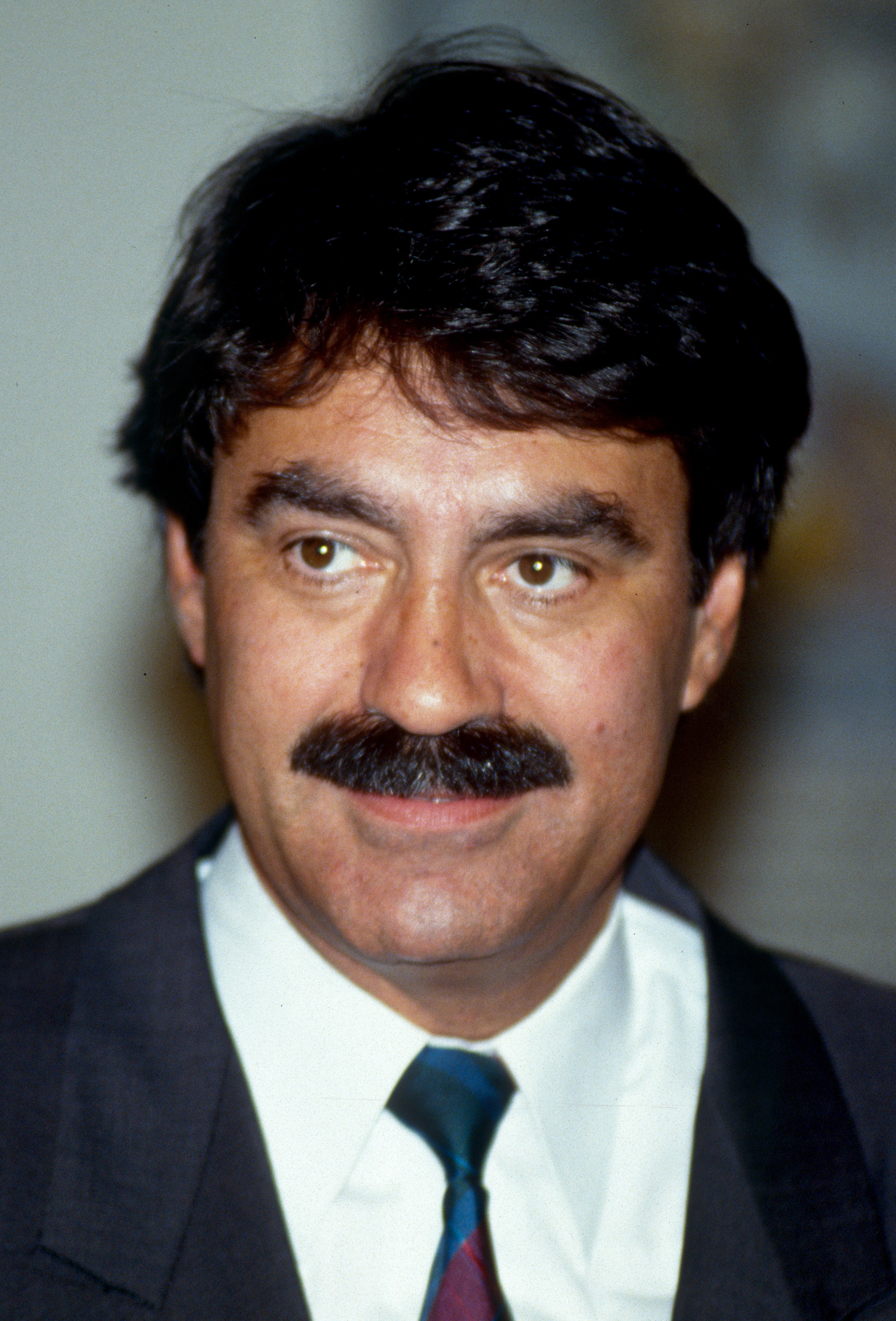
- Honegger in 1986
- Born: Eric Antoine Pierre Honegger; 29 April 1946 (age 80); Zürich, Switzerland
- Occupations: Politician, manager

Eric Antoine Pierre Honegger (born 29 April 1946) is a Swiss politician, member of the FDP. The Liberals party, and manager.

== Life ==
Eric Honegger was born in Zürich, a native of Rüschlikon and Fischenthal, the son of the late Fritz Honegger. He graduated in 1964 from the high school in Freudenberg, Zürich. Subsequently, he studied history and journalism at the University of Zurich and received his doctorate in 1976.

From 1975 to 1979 Honegger was party secretary of the FDP for the city and canton of Zürich. From 1980 to 1981 he worked at the Society for the Promotion of the Swiss economy (now part of Economiesuisse). He was from 1982 to 1987 leader of the Swiss Association of Graphic Company (SVGU, now Swiss Association for Visual Communication, Viscom).

From 1974 to 1978 he was a member of the council of Rüschlikon. From 1979 to 1987 he was a member of the Zürich cantonal parliament. In 1987 he was elected to the executive council, where he served until 1999 and he presided at the official 1993/94 and 1998/99. He initially led the Building Department, from 1991, the Finance Office.

Honegger had been since 1993 member of the board of SAirGroup. After his resignation as Minister, he was executive vice president of the Board of SAirGroup and from 1 May 2000 as a successor to chairman Hannes Goetz. In January 2001 he also took over the executive committee of the SAirGroup. In March 2001 he was deposed by the board and replaced by Mario Corti. In addition, Honegger was until 2001 a member of the board of directors of UBS and chairman of the Neue Zürcher Zeitung.

The prosecutor of the canton of Zürich raised charges against Honegger and another 18 people in March 2006 in connection with the Swissair bankruptcy case. Honegger was accused of embezzlement and tax fraud.

Honegger is CEO of the company Sophocles GmbH, which provides services and advice on matters of corporate governance (corporate management and supervision). He also has more mandates.

He is married and lives in Einsiedeln.
