= Raymond Devrient =

Swiss business executive (1904–1987)

- Born: 23 April 1904; Saint Petersburg, Russian Empire
- Died: 27 January 1987 (aged 82); Pully, Switzerland
- Occupation: Business executive
- Spouse: Renée Germaine Borel

Raymond Devrient (23 April 1904 – 27 January 1987) was a Swiss business executive. He was director of Publicitas from 1930 to 1943, director and then delegate of the board of the insurer La Suisse Assurances from 1943 to 1970, and president of the Swiss Insurance Association from 1962 to 1967.

== Biography ==
Raymond Devrient was born in Saint Petersburg, the son of Wilhelm-Woldemar Devrient, a publisher in Russia, and Marie-Hélène-Clara Lambossy. He went to school in Saint Petersburg and, from 1918, in Lausanne, and obtained a doctorate in law in 1931. He spent some time in Zurich and was secretary of the Vorort from 1927 to 1930. He married Renée Germaine Borel, daughter of Edouard Pierre Borel.

From 1930 to 1943 Devrient was director of Publicitas. From 1943 to 1970 he was director and then delegate of the board of directors (administrateur-délégué) of La Suisse Assurances. He shared Marcel Regamey's admiration for the corporatist model and was president of the Fédération vaudoise des corporations (Vaud federation of corporations) from 1938 to 1943. From 1954 to 1970 he was president of the Vaud Chamber of Commerce and Industry (Chambre vaudoise du commerce et de l'industrie). He was a member of the Zofingia student society. From 1962 to 1967 he was president of the Swiss Insurance Association.

He died in Pully on 27 January 1987.

== Bibliography ==
- Ph. Maspoli, Le corporatisme et la droite en Suisse romande, 1993
- J.-M. Spothelfer, Les Zofingiens, 1995, no. 2852
