= Alfred Frey =

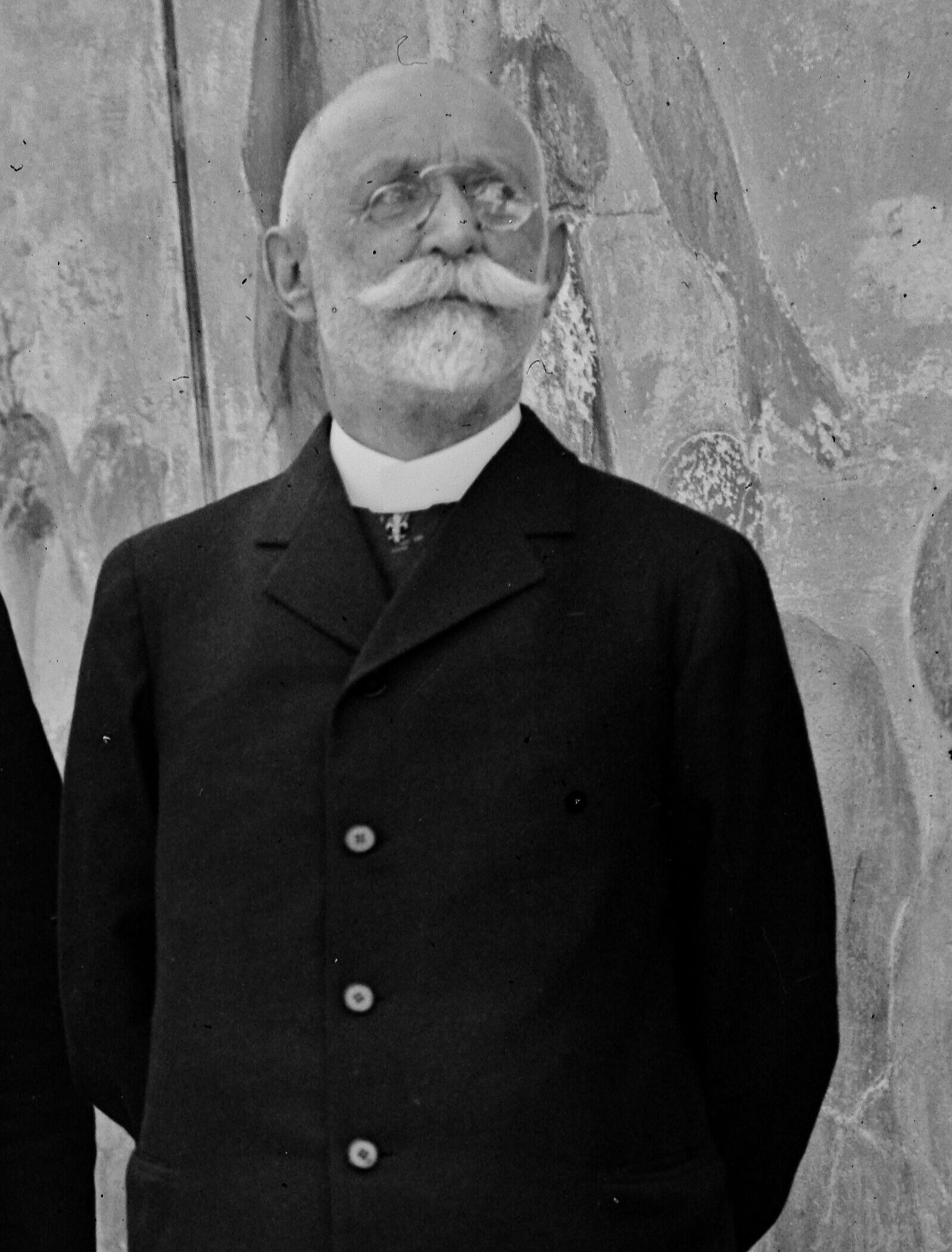
- Frey, c. 1922

Member of the National Council (Switzerland)
- In office 19 March 1900 – 22 September 1924
- Preceded by: Conrad Cramer-Frey
- Constituency: Canton of Zurich

Member of the Cantonal Council of Zürich
- In office 1902–1905

Personal details
- Born: Eugen Alfred Frey; 24 August 1859 Bern, Switzerland
- Died: 22 September 1924 (aged 65) Zürich, Switzerland
- Children: 6
- Occupation: Economist, politician

Eugen Alfred Frey colloquially Alfred Frey (24 August 1859 – 22 September 1924) was a Swiss economist and politician who served on the National Council (Switzerland) for the Free Radical Liberals from 1900 to 1924 (his death). He concurrently also served on the Cantonal Council of Zurich from 1902 to 1905.

In his professional life he was in a variety of executive capacities and served on the boards of Swiss Annuity Institution (Swiss Life), Neue Zürcher Zeitung, SUVA, Swiss Credit Institution (Credit Suisse), Beznau-Löntsch power plant (Axpo Holding), Aluminium-Industrie (Alusuisse) and the Swiss Federal Railways.

== Early life and education ==
Frey was born 24 August 1859 in Bern, Switzerland, the youngest of four children, to Jakob Frey, a writer and poet, and Rosina Frey (née Hunziker; 1830–1890), both originally from Gontenschwil. His siblings were; Lili Frey, Adolf Frey and Emil Frey (1856–1895), who founded Volksversicherung (later known as AHV).

Initially, after Mittelschule, Frey completed a commercial apprenticeship in Todtnau in the Wiesental, Black Forest. In 1878, aged 21, he began to study law, history and economics at the University of Zurich. Since 1880 he also studied abroad at the University of Berlin, Leipzig University and the University of Paris. He completed his Doctorate in Economics.

== Personal life ==
Frey married Emma Burger, originally of Freienwil, with whom he had four sons and two daughters.

- Alfred Frey, married Leonie Hablützel, with issue.
- Rosa Frey (1880–1960), married Gottlieb Hunziker, with issue.
- Max Frey (1895–1993), married Anna "Anny" Zuber, with issue.
- Siegfried Frey (1896–1945), married Gertrud Rütschi, three children.
- Jakob Frey (1904–1989), an attorney, married Irene Söhl (died 1979), originally from Uitikon, one daughter.

In the Swiss Armed Forces, Frey held the rank of Lieutenant colonel. He was distantly related to Samuel Frey, whom he strongly resembled.
