= Charles Boiceau =

Swiss lawyer and politician (1841–1907)

- Born: 14 July 1841; New York City, United States
- Died: 22 September 1907 (aged 66); Lausanne, Switzerland
- Occupations: Lawyer, politician

Charles Boiceau (14 July 1841 – 22 September 1907) was a Swiss lawyer and politician from the canton of Vaud. Specializing in international law, he held cantonal and federal office, sitting on the cantonal government and in the National Council.

== Biography ==
Boiceau was the son of Samson, a businessman in New York and later Lausanne who was one of the founders of the insurance company La Suisse in 1858, and of Hélène Wallace. He married Léonie Hollard, daughter of Charles, a tax collector in Lausanne, and was the brother-in-law of Emile-Samuel Bory. He studied law in Lausanne, Erlangen, and Bonn, became a lawyer in Lausanne from 1867 specializing in international law, and served as adviser to the British legation in Switzerland.

A liberal, Boiceau was a member of the legislative council of Lausanne (1871–1874, 1886–1905), a deputy in the Grand Council of Vaud (1874, 1885–1907), and a member of the cantonal government (1874–1885, in charge of public education). As a member of the National Council (1878–1881, 1893–1899), he sat on the important commission for the study of popular insurance. He was a cavalry colonel and president of the military court of cassation.

Boiceau also sat on boards of directors in the railway and insurance sectors, worked as a journalist for the Nouvelliste vaudois, and was active in charitable works and within the Vaud national church, serving as president of its synod. He was a member of Belles-Lettres.

== Bibliography ==
- Gruner, L'Assemblée fédérale suisse, 1, 776
