= Hans Wunderly-von Muralt =

Swiss industrialist and politician

- Born: 3 July 1842; Meilen, Switzerland
- Died: 23 January 1921 (aged 78); Zurich, Switzerland
- Occupations: Industrialist; politician
- Spouse: Amalia von Muralt (m. 1869)

Hans Wunderly-von Muralt (also spelled Wunderli; 3 July 1842 – 23 January 1921) was a Swiss industrialist and politician. From 1893 he headed the spinning company Wunderli, Zollinger & Cie., which in 1888 had been the largest in Switzerland. He sat in the National Council from 1893 to 1899 and was president of the Swiss Federation of Commerce and Industry from 1900 to 1917.

== Biography ==
Hans Wunderly-von Muralt was born in Meilen, the son of Johannes Wunderly and Susanna Zollinger. He grew up in Meilen and, from 1857, in Zurich. After a commercial apprenticeship he spent some time in England and France, and then worked in his father's spinning mill and in the family's tannery in Meilen. In 1869 he married Amalia von Muralt, daughter of Felix Robert von Muralt, a silk manufacturer.

From 1893 Wunderly-von Muralt headed the firm Wunderli, Zollinger & Cie. (formerly Heinrich Kunz). In 1888, with 224,000 spindles in the cantons of Zurich, Glarus and Aargau, the company was the largest spinning group in Switzerland. From 1875 to 1896 he was a liberal member of the Cantonal Council of Zurich for the constituency of Meilen, and from 1893 to 1899 a member of the National Council (Liberal-Democratic group). He represented large-scale industry and the banks and played a major part in the revision of the Swiss customs tariff.

In 1873 he was a co-founder of the Zurich Merchants' Society (Kaufmännische Gesellschaft Zürich). He was president of the Swiss Federation of Commerce and Industry from 1900 to 1917, vice-president of Credit Suisse (Schweizerische Kreditanstalt) from 1883 to 1900 and from 1911 to 1921, and a member of the boards of directors of various companies. Wunderly-von Muralt owned a valuable collection of coins and medals and was a patron in Meilen. He was made a knight of the French Legion of Honour. He died in Zurich on 23 January 1921.

== Bibliography ==
- Tobler-Meyer, Wilhelm: Die Münz- und Medaillen-Sammlung des Herrn Hans Wunderly von Muralt in Zürich, 5 vols., 1896–1898.
- Neue Zürcher Zeitung, 1921, nos. 116, 134 and 143.
- Gruner, Erich: Die schweizerische Bundesversammlung 1848–1920, vol. 1, 1966, pp. 127–128.
- Kummer, Peter: Chronik der Familie Wunderly von Meilen, 1999, pp. 25–26, 49–56.
