= Rolf Dörig =

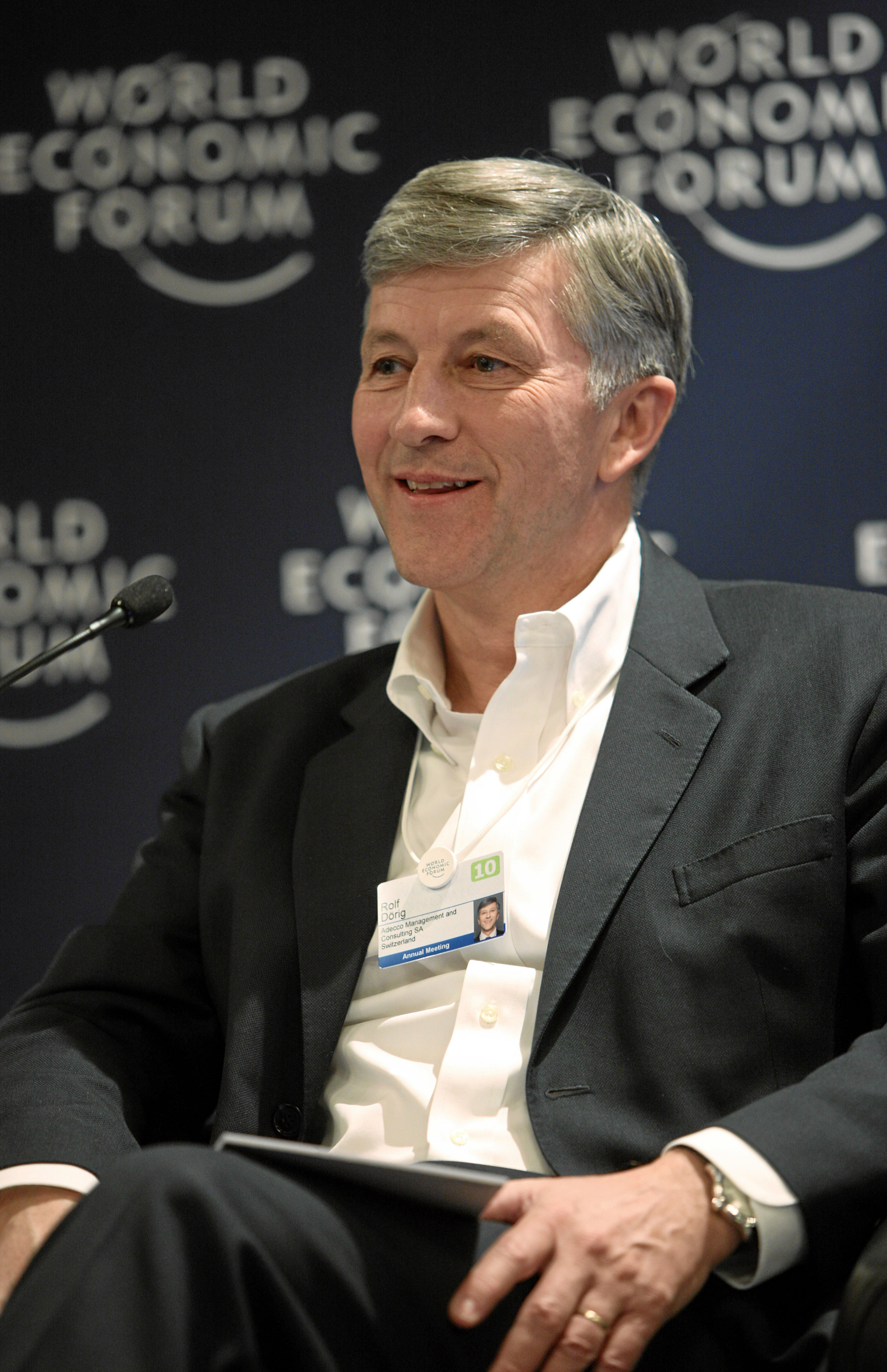
- Dörig in 2010
- Born: 19 May 1957 (age 69)
- Education: University of Zurich (PhD)
- Occupations: Chairman of Swiss Life, former chairman of The Adecco Group
- Spouse: married
- Children: 3

Rolf Hugo Dörig (born 19 May 1957) is a Swiss business executive He is chairman of Swiss Life. He was chairman of the Adecco Group from 2009 to 2020.

== Early life ==
Dörig graduated from the Cantonal School Enge and studied law at the University of Zurich, where he received his doctorate in 1985 from Max Keller. He earned a lawyer's license in the Canton of Zürich. He later attended an Advanced Management Program at Harvard Business School.

== Career ==
In 1986, Dörig joined Credit Suisse Bank, where he assumed leadership roles in various business areas. From 2000, he was a member of the Executive Board of Credit Suisse Group and responsible for the corporate banking and retail business in Switzerland. In 2002, he held the office of Chairman Switzerland of the Bank.

From November 2002 to May 2008, Dörig was President of the Executive Board of life insurer Swiss Life and from May 2008 to May 2009 Delegate of the Board of Directors. He has been Chairman of the Board of Directors of Swiss Life Holding since May 2009. He was also Chairman of the Board of Directors of the world's largest HR service provider the Adecco Group from 2009 to 2020. He is a member of the supervisory board of the wood manufacturer Danzer AG. He was Vice President of Kaba Holding AG (security company) and is member of the Board of Directors of Walter Frey Holding AG. He is a member of the Executive Committee of Economiesuisse, and a member of the Executive Board of the Grasshopper Club Zürich; from 2004 to 2009, he held the presidency there. Dörig was a member of the Friends of the FDP, formerly as president. Later he became a member of the "Stiftung für bürgerliche Politik" (Foundation for Civic Politics) whose goal is the financing of the Swiss People's Party (SVP). This also made him a close confidant of the SVP leadership. He has been a member of the SVP since 2023. From 2003 to 2008, he was a board member of the Swiss Insurance Association (SVV) and from 2003 to 2014, board member of the Zurich Chamber of Commerce. In November 2017, Rolf Dörig was voted President of the Swiss Insurance Association (SIA), he retired in June 2023. He also presided over the "Zürcher Volkswirtschaftliche Gesellschaft" (ZHVG).

== Other activities ==
- Trilateral Commission, Member of the European Group

== Political positions ==
Döring is a member of the Swiss People's Party, a national-conservative, right-wing populist political party in Switzerland. He defines himself as "socially conservative" and denounces the "sanctimonious woke attitude" in society. His views include a strong restriction of immigration, and the use of temporary work permits for foreigners with no right of family reunification.

== Personal life ==
Dörig is married, father of three sons and lives in Küsnacht. In the Swiss army he is colonel in the general staff. His hobbies are playing tennis, skiing and the opera.

== Publications ==
- Rolf Dörig: Ersatz sogenannter «Mangelfolgeschäden» aus Kaufvertrag (Art. 208 OR). Thesis, University of Zurich, 1985.
- Rolf Dörig et al. (Hrsg.): Versicherungsbranche im Wandel: Chancen und Risiken einer Neubesinnung. Liber amicorum für Moritz W. Kuhn zum 65. Geburtstag. Stämpfli, Bern 2009, ISBN 978-3-7272-2957-2

== Literature ==
- Rolf Dörig, in the Munzinger-Archiv
