= Negative Population Growth =

American population concern organization

Negative Population Growth is a non-profit organization in the United States, founded in 1972. It is named after the organization Zero Population Growth, which founder Don Mann believed wasn't going far enough to address his concerns about overpopulation.

NPG advocates for a gradual reduction in U.S. and world population. The organization believes the optimal population for the United States is between 150 and 200 million, while the optimal world population is between two and three billion. To achieve their goal of a smaller U.S. population, NPG promotes policies aimed at reducing the fertility rate in the U.S. to 1.5 births per woman and advocates for reducing immigration to the United States to 100,000 to 200,000 per year, down from the existing level of over 1.5 million per year.

In 2011, NPG claimed that their membership exceeded 25,000, although it is unclear what constituted a member.

== See also ==
- Agriculture and population limits
- Criticisms of globalization
- List of population concern organizations
- Malthusian catastrophe
- Over-consumption
- Overpopulation
- Population Connection
- The Limits to Growth
- The Revenge of Gaia
