= Junod =

Junod is a Swiss French surname.

== People ==
- Tom Junod, American journalist
- Marcel Junod, Swiss medical doctor
- Willy Junod, Swiss biathlete
- Henri-Alexandre Junod, Swiss theologian, ethnographer, anthropologist, and naturalist
- Etienne Junod, Swiss business executive
- Ellie Junod, Australian professional basketball player
- Eugene Junod - Interwar Polish actor, singer, and director - killed by the NKVD

== Other ==
Junod is a brand name of a biosimilar for the monoclonal antibody medication denosumab.
