= 2014 Swiss immigration initiative =

Referendum in Switzerland

Federal popular initiative "against mass immigration"
- 9 February 2014
- Do you accept the federal popular initiative 'against mass immigration'?
- Website: Official results

Results
Choice	Votes	%
Yes	1,463,854	50.33%
No	1,444,552	49.67%
Valid votes	2,908,406	98.65%
Invalid or blank votes	39,750	1.35%
Total votes	2,948,156	100.00%
Eligible to vote/turnout	5,211,426	56.57%
Yes	50.3%
No	49.7%
Blank	1.1%
Null	0.3%
- Results of the initiative, in the twenty-six cantons of Switzerland. It shows differences between linguistic regions (German-French: +10.6%; German-Italian: -16.0%; French-Italian: -26.6%) as well as between countryside and cities (-9.9%).

In Switzerland, the federal popular initiative "against mass immigration" (German: Eidgenössische Volksinitiative "Gegen Masseneinwanderung", French: Initiative populaire « Contre l'immigration de masse », Italian: Iniziativa popolare "Contro l'immigrazione di massa") was a referendum that aimed to limit immigration through quotas, as it had been prior to the bilateral treaties between Switzerland and the European Union (EU) launched in 2002.

The popular initiative was launched by the national conservative Swiss People's Party and was accepted by a majority of the electorate (50.3%, a difference of 19,526 votes) and a majority of the cantons (14.5 out of 23; 12 of 20 full cantons plus five of six half cantons) on 9 February 2014. This initiative was mostly backed by rural parts (57.6% approvals) of Switzerland as well as by a strong majority (69.2% approvals) in the Italian-speaking canton of Ticino, while metropolitan centres (58.5% rejection) and the French-speaking part (58.5% rejection) of Switzerland rejected it.

Swiss-EU bilateral treaties on single market participation are all co-dependent; if one is terminated, then all are terminated. Consequently, should Switzerland choose unilaterally to cancel the free movement agreement, then all its single market agreements with the EU will lapse unless a compromise is found. On 22 December 2016, Switzerland and the EU concluded an agreement that a new Swiss law (in response to the referendum) may require Swiss employers to give priority to Swiss-based job seekers (Swiss nationals and foreigners registered in Swiss job agencies) but does not limit the free movement of EU workers to Switzerland.

== Context ==
Transition in stages until free person movement between the European Union and Switzerland.

As of 2014, 23.4% of Switzerland's population were foreigners (9% in Germany). The net immigration was 80,000 people per year, 1% of the total population (three times more than e.g. in Germany, four times more than in the United States). Every year 30,000 to 40,000 received Swiss nationality (this represented a per capita rate of about three times that of both Germany and the United States). According to the European Commission about 1 million EU citizens lived in Switzerland and another 230,000 crossed the border daily for work, while 430,000 Swiss lived in the EU.

Immigrant workers made up a large part of the Swiss workforce in several industries. Scienceindustries, the Swiss association of chemical, pharma, and biotech businesses, emphasized that they relied on highly qualified workers from outside Switzerland to keep an edge over their competitors, and that 45% out of 67,000 people that its member companies employed in Switzerland were from abroad.

In 2002, the Swiss People's Party launched a federal popular initiative "against asylum abuse" that was rejected by 50.1% of voters (with a difference of 4,208 votes). In 2009, the referendum on biometric passports required by the Schengen Agreement was also accepted by 50.1% of voters (with a difference of 5,680 votes).

More recently, the Swiss People's Party had successfully launched federal popular initiatives "against the construction of minarets" (2009, 57.5%) and "for the expulsion of criminal foreigners" (2010, 52.3%).

== Proposal ==
The initiative "against mass immigration" proposed the following changes, under article 121a of the Swiss Federal Constitution:

1. Switzerland independently controls the immigration of foreigners.
2. The number of residence permits for foreigners in Switzerland shall be limited by annual maximums and quotas. The maximums apply to all permits of immigration law including the asylum system. Claims to permanent residence, family reunification, and social benefits can be restricted.
3. The annual maximums and quotas for employed foreigners shall be set according to the overall economic interests of Switzerland with priority for Swiss nationals; cross-border commuters shall be included. The deciding factors for the granting of residence permits shall especially be the request of an employer, the ability to integration, and a sufficient, independent livelihood.
4. No international treaties that infringe on this article may be concluded.
5. The law shall regulate the details.

In addition, the initiative added the following transition provisions under article 197 number 11 of the Federal Constitution:

1. International treaties that contradict article 121a shall be renegotiated and adjusted within three years of their adoption by the people and the cantons.
2. If the legislation to implement article 121a has not entered into force three years after its adoption by the people and the cantons, the Federal Council shall at that point issue ordinances for temporary implementation.

The Federal Assembly recommended against the adoption of the initiative on 27 September, 2013.

== Results ==
Detailed results of the vote on the federal popular initiative "against mass immigration" on 9 February 2014
Category	Absolute number	Proportion of total	Proportion of received	Proportion of valid and blank	Proportion of valid
Voters	5,211,426	100%	-	-	-
Ballot papers received	2,948,156	56.57%	100%	-	-
Invalid	8,656	0.17%	0.29%	-	-
Blank votes	31,094	0.60%	1.05%	1.06%	-
Valid votes	2,908,406	55.81% (yes and no)	98.65% (yes and no)	98.94% (yes and no)	100%
Yes	1,463,854	28.09%	49.65%	49.80%	50.33%
No	1,444,552	27.72%	49.00%	49.14%	49.67%

== Reception ==
=== National reactions ===
After the acceptance of the federal popular initiative "against mass immigration", views varied widely as to why the initiative was successful at the polls, and how it might actually be implemented. To some observers, the situation was reminiscent of the referendum held on 6 December 1992, when 50.3% of the Swiss people voted against joining the European Economic Area.

The Swiss People's Party, which was the main proponent of the initiative, celebrated the referendum outcome as a major victory. The party's head Toni Brunner stated: "This is a sea change in Switzerland's migration policy. It is clear that immigration will have to be massively restricted."

Some commentators fear a slowdown in economic activity due to the enforcement of the initiative. Business and industry groups were opposed to the initiative during the campaign and expressed concern about the measure's impact on their ability to attract and retain top talent from abroad. The Swiss Bankers Association expressed disappointment and concern at the result, saying: "We urgently need to hold constructive talks with the EU to explain our position".

Although all governing parties except the Swiss People's Party opposed the initiative, the Federal Council (the Swiss government) announced that it would promptly start implementing the new constitutional provisions and would set to work on re-introducing immigration quotas "without delay". The acceptance of the initiative binds the Swiss government to renegotiate the entire EU labor market agreements with the EU within three years; the current treaties stay in force in the meantime.

=== European Union reactions ===
The European Commission issued a statement saying that it was "disappointed" in the Swiss referendum on immigration restriction result but would wait to study how exactly the outcome of the referendum affects the relations between Switzerland and the European Union. European Commission vice-president Viviane Reding stated that the result of the referendum could jeopardise Switzerland's access to the European single market, saying "The single market is not Swiss cheese."

As of July 2016, negotiations had not led to any change in the EU's position that access to the European Single Market is inextricably linked to the principle of free movement of people.

== Consequences ==
Following protracted discussions between Switzerland and the EU, the Swiss government largely climbed down from the initial referendum proposals, adopting instead a "light national preference" to implement the referendum. This outcome was decried as a failure to properly implement the referendum by the Swiss SVP party (which had promoted the referendum) as it fails to put any curbs on immigration. Its leaders are considering a new referendum.

Their climbdown was largely due to the EU's unwavering negotiating tactic, as it was prepared to put at stake all existing collaborations between Switzerland and the European Union, such as:

- Registration, Evaluation, Authorisation and Restriction of Chemicals
- participation in education programs (e.g. Lifelong Learning Programme 2007–2013)
- participation in research programs (e.g. Framework Programmes for Research and Technological Development)

=== Education and research ===
In a statement to HINA, EU Commission spokesperson Joe Hennon said that the vote would influence the next round of talks for Swiss inclusion in Horizon 2020 and Erasmus+. The talks were about programmes which could be applied for in 2014. For the academic year 2011/2012, 2,612 Swiss students went abroad, at the same time 2,673 foreign students came to Switzerland with the Erasmus program. Under the Seventh Framework Programme, the predecessor to Horizon 2020, more than one in four Swiss research proposals were funded in a total of 3,000 projects, which was the fourth highest success rate on average. Swiss researchers secured €1.27 billion in EU funding between 2007 and 2012, including about €356 million in coveted basic research grants from the European Research Council. According to the "Innovation Union Scoreboard 2013" Switzerland was the overall innovation leader before Sweden, Germany, Denmark and Finland. It continuously outperformed the EU27 countries. By 26 February 2014, the EU announced that, at least for 2014, Switzerland's status in Horizon2020 would be downgraded from an associated to third-country and that Swiss-based scientists could not apply for ERC grants.

The referendum did not impact CERN's recruitment as it is an international organisation and does not need Swiss work permits.

=== Croatia ===
Following the referendum the Federal Council was no longer allowed to sign the already negotiated free movement accord with Croatia, which joined the EU in July 2013. The new Swiss constitution article was immediately binding for the Federal Council, which then looked for a way to not discriminate against Croatia. The European Commission connected the negotiations for the 2014 Erasmus program with the signing of the free movement accord for Croatia. On 4 March 2016, Switzerland and the EU signed a treaty that would extend the accord of the free movement of people to Croatia, something which would lead to Switzerland's full readmission into Horizon 2020. The treaty was ratified by the National Council on 26 April on the condition that a solution be found to an impasse on implementing the 2014 referendum. The treaty was passed in December 2016. This allowed Switzerland to rejoin Horizons 2020 on 1 January 2017.

== Implementation ==
The Swiss government had three years to implement the referendum. The government attempted to implement the referendum without endangering its bilateral agreements with the EU, something that generated much controversy.

On 12 December 2016, the Swiss parliament agreed to a solution on how to implement the referendum, and it formally voted on and approved the implementation on 16 December. The final measure was described as "watered down" or as "a compromise" intended to appease the EU and not harm its relationship. Although the 2014 referendum called for quotas, the accepted implementation did not include quotas but rather ordered employers to prioritize Swiss residents rather than foreign workers in locations where the unemployment rate is above average, and it requires foreigners to demonstrate that they are integrated in Swiss society in order to receive a residence permit. On 16 December the Swiss Federal Council also ratified the Protocol on the extension to Croatia of the Free Movement of Persons Agreement between the EU and Switzerland.

The accepted referendum implementation was harshly criticized by the Swiss People's Party, which sponsored the original referendum. The party called the plan "a betrayal of voters' wishes" surrendering to EU pressure, and unconstitutional. However, the SVP ruled out holding another referendum to force a stricter implementation of the referendum. The media also criticized the implementation proposal for deviating so far from the legally-binding referendum. The European Commission, however, cautiously welcomed the implementation, stating that it "appears to go in the right direction," and about a week later it released a mostly positive statement concerning the implementation.

=== Proposed initiatives in response to the implementation proposal ===
In an attempt to soften the immigration law further, in order to avoid conflict with the EU, the Swiss government proposed two alternatives to a proposed popular initiative to completely repeal the 2014 referendum. The government's counterproposals, if approved by voters, would prohibit changing Swiss law if it would conflict with "international treaties of vital interest to Switzerland" or remove the three-year implementation limit, respectively. On 28 December 2016, a popular initiative to challenge the government's proposed implementation was launched by a Social Democrat-member, acting as a private citizen. It did not reach the required number of signatures in the allotted timeframe. In early 2017, four citizens' committees joined together to challenge the implementation proposal, which they saw as "not compatible with the 2014 initiative."

== See also ==
- 2014 Swiss referendums
- Ecopop
- Demographics of Switzerland
- Freedom of movement for workers
- Immigration to Switzerland
- Politics of Switzerland
- Switzerland–European Union relations
- 2016 United Kingdom European Union membership referendum
