= Louis von Planta =

Swiss business executive (1917–2003)

- Born: Ludwig Fortunat von Planta; 15 March 1917; Zurich, Switzerland
- Died: 19 August 2003 (aged 86); Basel, Switzerland
- Education: University of Basel
- Occupations: Lawyer; business executive
- Spouse: Anne-Marie Ehinger (m. 1944)

Louis von Planta (born Ludwig Fortunat von Planta; 15 March 1917 – 19 August 2003) was a Swiss lawyer and business executive. He was chairman of the chemical company Ciba-Geigy from 1972 to 1987 and president of the Swiss Federation of Commerce and Industry from 1976 to 1987. He was the architect of the merger of Ciba with Geigy.

== Biography ==
Louis von Planta was born in Zurich, the son of Fortunat Otto von Planta, an instructor officer and, from 1918, a textile industrialist, and Christina Marguerite Riggenbach. He attended the humanist gymnasium (Humanistisches Gymnasium) in Basel and studied law at the University of Basel. In 1939 he obtained his doctorate and passed the bar examination. In 1944 he married Anne-Marie Ehinger.

From 1946 to 1967 Planta was a partner in a Basel law and notary firm. In 1965 he was elected to the board of directors of Geigy, becoming vice-chairman in 1967 and chairman in 1968. At Ciba-Geigy he was delegate of the board from 1970 to 1987 and chairman from 1972 to 1987. He was president of the Basel Chamber of Commerce from 1969 to 1976, of the Swiss Society of Chemical Industries from 1975 to 1976 and of the Vorort, the Swiss Federation of Commerce and Industry, from 1976 to 1987. Planta was the architect of the merger of Ciba with Geigy, and with his extensive experience and connections he made a substantial contribution to preparing the merger of Ciba and Sandoz into Novartis in 1996.

In 1973 Planta received an honorary doctorate in natural sciences from the University of Fribourg, and in 1986 the friendship award of the American Swiss Association. He died in Basel on 19 August 2003.
