= Winterberger =

Winterberger is a surname. Notable people with the surname include:

- Abby Winterberger (born 2010), American freestyle skier
- Alexander Winterberger (1834–1914), German organist and composer
- Gerhard Winterberger (1922–1993), Swiss business association executive
