= List of population concern organizations =

This is a list of organizations that promote a moderation of the size of the human population.

== Intergovernmental organizations ==
=== Worldwide ===
- UNFPA (United Nations Population Fund)

=== Regional ===
==== Asia-Oceania ====
- All countries – Asian Forum of Parliamentarians on Population and Development

==== Asia, Caribbean, North and Sub-Saharan Africa, Latin America and Middle East ====
- Partners in Population and Development

== Governmental organizations ==
=== India ===
- National Commission on Population

== Non-governmental organizations ==
=== Australia ===
- Sustainable Population Australia

=== Ethiopia ===
- Population, health, and the environment (PHE)

=== Germany ===
- German Foundation for World Population

=== India ===
- Population Foundation of India

=== Madagascar ===
- Blue Ventures

=== Netherlands ===
- Rutgers WPF

=== Switzerland ===
- Ecopop

=== Uganda ===
- Conservation Through Public Health (Population Health Environment programme)

=== United Kingdom ===
- Population Matters (previously the Optimum Population Trust)

=== United States ===
- Californians for Population Stabilization
- Center for Biological Diversity
- Earth Policy Institute
- National Commission for the Observance of World Population Year 1974
- Negative Population Growth
- NumbersUSA
- Population Action International
- Population Balance
- Population Connection (called Zero Population Growth until 2002)
- Population Council
- Population Media Center
- Population Reference Bureau
- Worldwatch Institute

== Academic researchers ==
- Population Europe

== Political groups ==
- Australia – Stop Population Growth Now
- Australia – Sustainable Australia

== Religious groups ==
- United States – Church of Euthanasia

== See also ==
- Human overpopulation
- Overshoot (population)
- Human population planning
- Category:Population concern political parties
