= Ecopop =

Swiss group against overpopulation

Ecology and Population (Ecopop)
- (in German) Umwelt und Bevölkerung (in French) Écologie et population (in Italian) Ecologia e popolazione
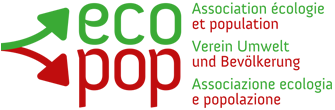
- Abbreviation: Ecopop
- Formation: 1971; 55 years ago
- Type: Ecological and political advocacy group
- Legal status: Active
- Region served: Switzerland
- President: Roland Schmutz
- Website: www.ecopop.ch

Ecopop (ECOlogie et POPulation, "Ecology and Population") is a Swiss voluntary association established in 1971 dedicated to the preservation of non-renewable resources and the reduction of overpopulation. Ecopop is a member of European Population Alliance (founded 2012).

Founded under the mathematical trend of exponential growth of world population and the finiteness of natural resources, and inspired by the Club of Rome, the association is formed as part of the nascent ecology movement as Arbeitsgruppe Bevölkerungsentwicklung ("working group for population development"). It was renamed to its current name in 1987. It was active throughout the 1970s to 2000s in organising conferences and podiums on population growth.

== Popular initiative ==
In 2011, the general assembly decided to launch a popular initiative with the aim of reducing population growth in Switzerland. The initiative was officially declared valid on 4 December 2012. It was submitted to the voters on 30 November 2014, who rejected it (74.1% NO votes).

The initiative proposes to insert two articles into the Swiss Federal Constitution:

1. reduction of net population growth due to immigration to a maximum of 0.2% of total population per year
2. at least 10% of Swiss federal development aid is to be invested in programs to encourage voluntary family planning.

Throughout the 40 years of its existence the association had ostensibly been part of the ecology movement, proposing degrowth out of Malthusian concerns mostly aimed at an academic or intellectual public, and during the 1970s it explicitly denounced populist or xenophobic motivation for immigration control advocated by James Schwarzenbach.

Nevertheless, in the political climate of the immigration debate in Switzerland, especially due to the proximity of Ecopop's initiative to the immigration referendum of February 2014, which resulted in widespread fears among the political and economic elite of deteriorating relations with the European Union, critics tended to accuse Ecopop or its supporters of (variously) xenophobic, racist, fascist, selfish or hypocritical motives. These attacks were mostly based on the initiative's second paragraph dedicated to global rather than national population growth, as the idea of foreign aid invested in curbing population growth in developing countries was attacked as politically incorrect and some leftist critics went as far as equating it with child euthanasia in Nazi Germany. Recommendations by parties and organisations were predominantly negative, even Green Party of Switzerland, the Green Liberal Party of Switzerland and Greenpeace Switzerland took a negative stance, as did the notoriously immigration-critical Swiss People's Party (on the national level, with several cantonal sections in support). While leftist opposition to Ecopop is mostly expressed as criticism of xenophobia, centrist and right-of-center parties oppose it because of its economic repercussions, as a cap on immigrant workers in Switzerland would deprive the economy of flexible recruitment of specialists as well as deteriorate Switzerland–European Union relations.

== See also ==
- Environmental movement in Switzerland
- Immigration to Switzerland
- List of organisations campaigning for population stabilisation
- List of population concern organizations
- Malthusianism
