= Elco AG =

Swiss stationery and paper company

- Company type: Private
- Industry: Paper, Stationery
- Founded: 1884; 142 years ago as Freya Co. Gontenschwil, Switzerland; 1891; 135 years ago as Frey & Wiederkehr; Gontenschwil, Switzerland
- Founder: Samuel Frey
- Area served: DACH region
- Key people: John Zoellin (CEO)
- Parent: Wipf Holding Ltd.
- Website: myelco.ch

Elco AG (formerly known as Frey, Wiederkehr & Co, Seetal Papier, Schaller Frewi and Seetal Schaller) is a Swiss stationery and paper company. Headquartered in Brugg, Switzerland, it is one of the leading companies in its industry in the DACH region.

== History ==
In 1884, the company was originally established as Freya Paper Manufacturing Co. in Gontenschwil, Switzerland by Samuel Frey. The original predecessors products initially included paper bags mainly used in the packaging and tobacco industry. In 1891 business partner Hermann Wiederkehr entered the company and subsequently it became a partnership named Frey & Wiederkehr. The products now included envelopes, printing and stationery and the manufacturing was automatized through machinery.

In 1904, the company moved to Zurich, Switzerland, where they built a new manufacturing plant opened in 1907. Among the most important customers where NZZ and Tagesanzeiger, the largest daily newspapers at the time. Victor Frey, son of the founder, left the company in 1932 due to internal differences with the Wiederkehr family on the business development. He remained a passive shareholder.

Since the 1960s, the company was merged several times with other, smaller manufacturing companies. In 1969 the company was merged with Schaller & Co AG ultimately named Schaller Frewi AG. In 1994, the next merger was with Seetal Papier, which renamed the company Seetal Schaller AG. Ultimately it became Seetal Elco AG in 2007. Since 2006, the company is part of Wipf Holding Ltd.

== Products ==
Elco AG specializes in the production of envelopes, paper and cards, writing pads and notepads, exercise books and folders. The company also offers direct mail solutions and services.

== Literature ==
- Rolf Bolliger: Die Papierfabrik Frey und Wiederkehr. Historische Vereinigung Wynental, 2005 (in German)
- Hans B. Kälin: Die ELCO Papier AG in Allschwil bei Basel. In: IPH-Information, Mitteilungsblatt der Internationalen Arbeitsgemeinschaft der Papierhistoriker, ISSN 0250-8338, Band 11 (1977), Nr. 2, S. 49–51 (in German)
- 100 Jahre Elco Papier AG. In: Allgemeine Papier-Rundschau, ISSN 0002-5917, Band 124 (2000), Nr. 18, S. 418–419 (in German)
