= Etienne Junod =

Swiss business executive (1914–2012)

- Born: 9 October 1914; Lourenço Marques (now Maputo), Portuguese Mozambique
- Died: 17 April 2012 (aged 97); Geneva, Switzerland
- Occupations: Lawyer; business executive
- Spouses: Andrée Martin; Trudy Zimmermann (m. 1970)

Etienne Junod (9 October 1914 – 17 April 2012) was a Swiss lawyer and business executive. He was general director of Hoffmann-La Roche from 1958 to 1977, president of the Swiss Society of Chemical Industries from 1963 to 1970 and president of the Swiss Federation of Commerce and Industry from 1970 to 1976.

== Biography ==
Etienne Junod was born in Lourenço Marques (now Maputo, Mozambique), the son of Henri-Alexandre Junod and Hélène Kern. He attended the Collège Calvin in Geneva and studied law in Geneva and Zurich, qualifying as a lawyer in 1939. He was married first to Andrée Martin and, from 1970, to Trudy Zimmermann, daughter of Paul Zimmermann, a restorer.

From 1942 to 1945 Junod worked in the diplomatic service, and in 1945–1946 he was commercial attaché at the Swiss legation in The Hague. In 1947 he was secretary of the Swiss Bankers Association, and from 1950 to 1953 deputy director of the Union Bank of Switzerland in Lausanne. In 1953 he joined Hoffmann-La Roche, where he became a director in 1956 and was general director from 1958 to 1977. From 1959 to 1964 he was president of Pharmaceutical Industries, the chemical industry association of the European Free Trade Association (EFTA) countries.

From 1958 Junod sat on the committee of the Swiss Society of Chemical Industries (Schweizerische Gesellschaft für Chemische Industrie, since 2003 SGCI Chemie Pharma Schweiz). He became its vice-president in 1962 and was its president from 1963 to 1970. From 1970 to 1976 he was president of the Swiss Federation of Commerce and Industry (the Vorort), and from 1978 to 1983 chairman of the board of the Journal de Genève. A central figure of the Swiss pharmaceutical industry, Junod was a distinguished gentleman without airs. He died in Geneva on 17 April 2012.

== Bibliography ==
- Basler Nachrichten, 8 October 1974
- Journal de Genève, 9 October 1974
- H. Frank, Köpfe der Schweizer Wirtschaft, 1976, 49–51
