= Hans Jakob Wunderli =

Swiss tanner and politician (1751–1822)

- Born: 24 October 1751; Meilen, Old Swiss Confederacy
- Died: 20 January 1822 (aged 70); Meilen, Switzerland
- Occupations: Tanner; politician
- Spouse: Esther Reif (m. 1774)
- Parents: Hans Wunderli (father); Susanna Güttinger (mother)
- Relatives: Johannes Wunderly (grandson)

Hans Jakob Wunderli (24 October 1751 – 20 January 1822) was a Swiss tanner and politician from Meilen. During the Stäfa affair of 1794–1795 he was fined for distributing the Memorial. In 1798 he presided over the national assembly of Meilen, which sent an ultimatum to the Zurich government. He was a member of the cantonal court from 1798 to 1803 and president of the municipality of Meilen from 1800 to 1803 and from 1806 to 1820.

== Biography ==
Hans Jakob Wunderli was born in Meilen, the son of Hans, a baker and possibly a tanner, and Susanna Güttinger. In 1774 he married Esther Reif. He was the grandfather of Johannes Wunderly.

In 1771 Wunderli took over the local tannery, which his grandfather had already run, and expanded the business. In 1789 he became treasurer (Seckelmeister) of the village corporation, and in 1791 rural judge (Landrichter) and adjutant of the military district (Quartier) of Küsnacht. He was a member of the reading society (Lesegesellschaft) of Stäfa, and in the Stäfa affair (Stäfnerhandel) of 1794–1795 he was fined for distributing the Memorial.

In 1798 Wunderli presided over a committee of the congress of rural communes held in Wädenswil, over the Landeskommission (a constituent assembly) and over the national assembly of Meilen (Meilemer Nationalversammlung), which sent an ultimatum to the Zurich government and set troops from the countryside on the march. From 1798 to 1803 he was a member of the cantonal court, and from 1800 to 1803 and from 1806 to 1820 he was president of the municipality (Gemeindepräsident) of Meilen. He died in Meilen on 20 January 1822.

== Bibliography ==
- P. Kummer, Chronik der Familie Wunderly von Meilen, 1999
