= Heinrich Fehlmann =

Swiss insurance executive (1880–1952)

- Portrait by Hans Bertle, 1928
- Born: 15 April 1880; Aarau, Switzerland
- Died: 21 August 1952 (aged 72); Winterthur, Switzerland
- Education: Heidelberg University; Ludwig-Maximilians-Universität München; University of Bern
- Occupations: Lawyer; insurance executive
- Spouse: Klara Richard

Heinrich Fehlmann (15 April 1880 – 21 August 1952) was a Swiss lawyer and insurance executive. He was general director of the Swiss Accident Insurance Company, later Winterthur Insurance, from 1921 to 1940, and president of the Association of Swiss Insurance Companies from 1943 to 1950.

== Biography ==
Heinrich Fehlmann was born in Aarau, the son of Heinrich Fehlmann, a factory supervisor in Aarau. He studied law at Heidelberg University, the Ludwig-Maximilians-Universität München, and the University of Bern, obtained a doctorate in law in 1903 and qualified as an attorney (Fürsprecher). He married Klara Richard, daughter of Johann Friedrich Richard.

In 1904, Fehlmann became secretary to the management of the Swiss Accident Insurance Company. He was its general director from 1921 to 1940, delegate of the board of directors from 1940 to 1944 and vice-chairman of the board from 1944 to 1952. From 1943 to 1950, he was president of the Association of Swiss Insurance Companies and was active in legislative matters. He sat on the boards of the Union Bank of Switzerland from 1943 to 1952 and of the insurer La Neuchâteloise from 1929 to 1952. He was a commercial court judge in the canton of Zurich. He died in Winterthur on 21 August 1952.

== Bibliography ==
- Biographisches Lexikon des Aargaus, 1803–1957, 1958, 196–197
