= Swiss Life Select =

German financial services company

- Type: Public
- Founded: 1988
- Headquarters: Hannover

Swiss Life Select Deutschland GmbH, headquartered in Hanover, is a financial advisory firm offering consultation in insurance, investment and real estate matters.

It was initially created under the name AWD Holding by Carsten Maschmeyer and acquired in 2007 by Swiss Life. Via Swiss Life Deutschland Holding, Swiss Life Select is a wholly owned subsidiary of the listed Swiss financial advisory and insurance group Swiss Life.

== Key figures ==
Swiss Life Select does not publish separate financial figures, but they are included in the consolidated financial statements of Swiss Life Deutschland Holding. In the consolidated financial statements of Swiss Life Deutschland Holding, the four financial distributors Swiss Life Select Deutschland, tecis, HORBACH and Proventus generated sales of 385.5 million euros in the 2018 financial year. The number of consultants on December 31, 2017, is reported as 3538 consultants licensed under commercial law. Around 750 permanent employees currently working at the Hanover location, the back office for all sales.

== History ==
The AWD company was founded in 1987. There is a popular belief that Carsten Maschmeyer founded the company alone, together with his later wife Bettina or her brother Kai Lange, but the official founder was Kai Lange, alone or with his girlfriend Ulrike Schröter.
