= Leonhard Steiner =

Swiss writer and painter (1836–1920)

- Born: 9 November 1836; Zurich, Switzerland
- Died: 13 December 1920 (aged 84); Zurich, Switzerland
- Occupations: Businessman, writer, painter
- Spouses: Maria Franziska Schweikhofer (m. 1860) Anna Cramer (m. 1863)

Leonhard Steiner (9 November 1836 – 13 December 1920) was a Swiss businessman, writer and landscape painter from Zurich. He presided over the Swiss Federation of Commerce and Industry (SHIV) from 1872 to 1874. He became popular as an author of poems and comedies in Zurich German, and landscape painting, which he took up at the age of 48 as a self-taught artist, brought him international success.

== Biography ==
Leonhard Steiner was the son of Leonhard Steiner, a silk industrialist, and Maria Elisabetha née Hess. In 1860 he married Maria Franziska Schweikhofer, and in 1863 Anna Cramer. Steiner had to take over his father's business, which he gave up in 1879/1880 because it had been making only losses since the early 1870s. He was the last president of the Zurich Exchange Association (Börsenverein Zürich) and, in 1874–1875, the first president of the Zurich Commercial Society (Kaufmännische Gesellschaft Zürich), which emerged from it. From 1872 to 1874 he also presided over the SHIV.

In 1879 Steiner published his first volume of poems in Zurich German, Glärnischfahrt. He became popular as an author of poems and comedies in Zurich German, such as Läbedi Bilder (1883), Edelwyss (1888) and E praktisches Landchind (1889). He also wrote poems in Standard German, such as Uto und Pluto (1880), dramas such as Ulrich von Hutten (1886), and festival plays (Festspiele), among others for the Federal Shooting Festival of 1889.

Gebirgslandschaft bei Sonnenaufgang (Mountain landscape at sunrise), watercolor by Steiner

At the age of 48 Steiner took up landscape painting as a self-taught artist, and it brought him international success. He exhibited at the Künstlerhaus in Zurich in 1897, 1898 and 1906, and at the Helmhaus in Zurich in 1909, 1912 and 1916. Cantonal governments and railway companies commissioned him to create special landscape paintings for advertising purposes for the exhibitions in Geneva in 1896, Paris in 1899 and Milan in 1906.

== Bibliography ==
- Schweizerischer Kunstverein (ed.), Schweizerisches Künstler-Lexikon, edited by Carl Brun, 3, 1913, 242–243
