= Gerhard Winterberger =

Swiss business association executive

- Born: 1 May 1922; Thun, Switzerland
- Died: 17 October 1993 (aged 71); Erlenbach, Switzerland
- Occupation: Business association executive
- Spouse: Helen Krähenbühl (m. 1952)

Gerhard Winterberger (1 May 1922 – 17 October 1993) was a Swiss business association executive. He was director of the Swiss Federation of Commerce and Industry, the Vorort, from 1970 to 1987. Under him the Vorort reached the peak of its influence on Swiss economic policy.

== Biography ==
Gerhard Winterberger was born in Thun, the son of Andreas Winterberger, rector of the Thun vocational school (Gewerbeschule), and Klara Giger. He studied economics and law in Bern, obtained a doctorate (Dr. rer. pol.) in 1947, and did postdoctoral studies at the Graduate Institute of International Studies (Institut de hautes études internationales) in Geneva and in London. In 1952 he married Helen Krähenbühl.

Winterberger worked for the Federal Price Control Office (Eidgenössische Preiskontrollstelle) in Territet and then for the Solothurn Chamber of Commerce. From 1953 to 1956 he was secretary of the Association for a Sound Currency (Vereinigung für gesunde Währung), and from 1956 to 1961 he headed the Association of Swiss Rayon Manufacturers (Verband Schweizerischer Kunstseidefabriken). In 1961 he became secretary of the Swiss Federation of Commerce and Industry. He was its director from 1970 to 1987 and a managing member of its presidium (geschäftsführendes Präsidialmitglied) from 1976 to 1987. Under Winterberger the Vorort reached the peak of its influence on Swiss economic policy.

As a member of the Mont Pelerin Society, Winterberger was in contact from 1959 with economists such as Wilhelm Röpke and Friedrich August von Hayek. Through articles in the Neue Zürcher Zeitung and the Schweizer Monatshefte and through lectures, he succeeded in winning public support for his causes. He sat on the board of directors of Überseebank AG (now Falcon Private Bank) and on the supervisory board of the Rentenanstalt, which he chaired from 1991. He died in Erlenbach on 17 October 1993.

== Works ==
- Politik und Wirtschaft, 1980

== Bibliography ==
- A. Jetzer et al. (eds.), Ordo et Libertas, 1982 (with a list of works)
- Neue Zürcher Zeitung, 19 and 21 October 1993
- A. Franc, "Schweiz, Filz und Neoliberalismus", in Schweizer Monat 93, 2013, no. 1003, 44–52
