= Pierre Borgeaud =

Swiss business executive (1934–2019)

- Born: 31 March 1934; Pompaples, Switzerland
- Died: 11 July 2019 (aged 85); Winterthur, Switzerland
- Education: ETH Zurich
- Occupations: Mechanical engineer; business executive
- Spouse: Regula Eisen

Pierre Borgeaud (31 March 1934 – 11 July 2019) was a Swiss engineer and business executive. He was general director of Sulzer from 1975 to 1988 and its chairman from 1988 to 2000, and president of the Swiss Federation of Commerce and Industry from 1987 to 1993.

== Biography ==
Pierre Borgeaud was born in Pompaples, the son of Gaston Borgeaud, an engineer, and Marguerite Pavillard. He went to school in Winterthur and studied at ETH Zurich from 1954 to 1960, qualifying as a mechanical engineer in 1960. He married Regula Eisen, daughter of Albert Eisen, an optician in Winterthur.

In 1960 Borgeaud joined Sulzer Brothers (Gebrüder Sulzer), where he was general director from 1975 to 1988 and then chairman of the board of directors from 1988 to 2000. He was president of the Swiss Association of Machinery Manufacturers from 1978 to 1986 and of the Vorort, the Swiss Federation of Commerce and Industry (now Economiesuisse), from 1987 to 1993, and a member of the Bank Council of the Swiss National Bank from 1987 to 1994. He sat on the boards of directors of Winterthur Insurance, the Swiss Bank Corporation (now UBS), Bühler in Uzwil and the Société Internationale Pirelli. For four years he was a member of the municipal legislature of Winterthur for the Free Democratic Party. From 1960 to 1976 he was a parish councillor. He died in Winterthur on 11 July 2019.
