= Swiss Union of Arts and Crafts =

Organization for small and medium enterprises

The Swiss Union of Arts and Crafts, (in German Schweizerischer Gewerbeverband SVG, in Italian Unione svizzera delle arti e mestieri USAM, in French Union Suisse des Arts et Métiers USAM) or Swiss Trade Association is a Swiss umbrella organization representing the small and medium-sized enterprises of the country.

It is one of the three umbrella organizations of the Swiss economy, alongside Swiss Employer's Association and Economiesuisse.

== History ==
The Swiss Union of Arts and Crafts was founded in 1879 by dissidents from the Swiss Union of Commerce and Industry (today Economiesuisse). Its policy, more conservative than that of the Vorort, included measures to protect the domestic market, particularly important at the end of the 19th century, such as raising customs duties.

== Role ==
USAM promotes the role of small and medium-sized enterprises (SMEs, i.e. 10 to 249 employees according to the Federal Statistical Office) in economic growth, and represents their interests in political and economic debates. Politically independent, it advocates, at a federal level, individual responsibility, respect for property rights and freedom of trade and undertaking, as guaranteed by the Federal Constitution. It advocates a modest and efficient state.

The USAM presides the Alliance of Economic Circles for a moderate prevention policy, a Swiss lobby that advocates a conciliatory legislation in terms of health regulations, particularly in the areas of tobacco and alcohol.

=== Members ===
USAM members include cantonal unions of arts and crafts, professional and industry associations and other organizations.

Some members are large multinational companies, such as the "Swiss Cigarette" association comprising Philip Morris International, British American Tobacco and Japan Tobacco International.

== Action ==
The basis of the action of the Swiss Union of Arts and Crafts is the reduction of legal standards and regulations, the reduction of the tax burden on SMEs and cutting red tape. To this end, the Union is lobbying at the federal level. It has spokespersons in the Federal Parliament, particularly in the Parliamentary Affairs Group, and in the cantons and municipalities.

The Union's priority sectors are:

- Vocational training
- Energy and environmental policy
- Fiscal and financial policy
- Planning and Transportation
- Social and labour market policies
- Economic policy

=== Energetic and environmental policy ===
The Union reaffirmed its demands in this field at the 43rd French-speaking Arts and Crafts Days organized in Champéry, on 28 and 29 June 2010. It calls for security and self-sufficiency of supply and calls for an increase in energy efficiency, the use of renewable energy and the renewal of existing nuclear power plants to achieve these objectives. It does not oppose the construction of combined gas plants, provided that these do not replace electro-nuclear power plants.

=== Planification and transport ===
The Union calls for a reduction in the burden on transport companies and opposes the extension and the increase of the Heavy Vehicle Fee (redevance poids-lourds liée aux prestations - RPLP).

=== Tax and financial policy ===
On 4 February 1992, the Union launched a popular initiative "For the abolition of direct federal taxation", supported by the national councillors Philippe Pidoux, Suzette Sandoz, Joseph Iten and Maximilian Reimann, the Vorort, the Patronal Centre, the Vaud League and the National Recovery. The initiative was deposited with the Federal Chancellery on 3 August 1993, with 108,458 signatures. 106,419 of them are declared valid on December 6, 1993. On 13 April 1994, the Federal Council rejected the initiative, considering that it threatened social peace and that the introduction of VAT had already met the Union's wishes. After numerous parliamentary negotiations, the Union withdrew the initiative on 5 December 1996.

The Union is in favour of a single rate for Value Added Tax (VAT), but is opposed to vocational training being subject to it. It also calls for a reduction in the burden on SMEs and a simplification of administrative formalities. It calls for an exemption from copyright for SMEs.

=== Social politics ===
In 2007, the Union campaigned against the popular initiative "For a social and unique health insurance fund", in which it saw a risk of an increase in social security contributions.

The Union participates in debates on old age and survivors' insurance (AHV). Since 2004, it has proposed gradually raising the retirement age to 67 between 2018 and 2030. The increase must be able to ensure an expenditure coverage rate of between 70% and 80%. The Union opposes a reduction in pensions and the abolition of the mandatory nature of the AHV. At the Swiss Congress of Arts and Crafts, held in Lugano on 28 May 2010, it also called for the cost of regulation to be reduced from CHF 50 billion to CHF 10 billion. In order to achieve this objective, the Union requests that a regulatory cost control body be set up.

== Organization ==
The Swiss Union of Arts and Crafts is the umbrella organization for 266 associations representing small and medium-sized businesses in 2009. These represent a total of 300,000 affiliated companies. It federates the cantonal and the professional sector associations. It is a member of the European Union of Craft, Small and Medium-sized Enterprises (UEAPME).

Its policy and long-term orientations are determined by the Swiss Congress of Arts and Crafts, which brings together about a thousand delegates every two years. The Swiss Chamber of Commerce is its parliament. It has 99 delegates. Its role is to take a stand in political debates and express the Union's opinion on federal legislative proposals. A steering committee of fifteen people implements the Union's policy, so the Bern office manages the day-to-day business.

The headquarters of the Swiss Union of Arts and Crafts is in Bern. Management is the responsibility of the Director.

=== Presidents ===
- 1879: Louis Troxler
- 1880-1882: Friedrich Autenheimer
- 1882-1884: Theodor Hoffmann-Merian
- 1884-1885: Friedrich Wüest
- 1885-1897: Johannes Stössel
- 1897-1915: Jakob Scheidegger
- 1915-1930: Hans Tschumi
- 1930-1941: August Schirmer
- 1941-1951: Paul Gysler
- 1951-1968: Ulrich Meyer
- 1968-1973: Karl Hackhofer
- 1973-1982: Rudolf Etter
- 1982-1991: Markus Kündig
- 1991-2004: Hans-Rudolf Früh
- 2004-2010: Eduard Engelberger
- 2010-2011: Bruno Zuppiger
- Since 2012: Jean-François Rime (not re-elected to the National Council in the 2019 federal elections)

=== Directors ===
- 1963-1979: Otto Fischer
- 1980-1984: Markus Kamber
- 1985-1989: Peter Clavadetscher
- 1990-2008: Pierre Triponez
- Since 2008: Hans-Ulrich Bigler (not re-elected to the National Council in the federal elections of 2019)

== Journal des arts et métiers ==
The Swiss Union of Arts and Crafts publishes the Journal des arts et métiers (JAM), in French, and the Schweizerische Gewerbezeitung (SGZ), in German. Together, the two magazines have a print run of 150,000 copies. They are printed by St. Galler Tagblatt AG, and Publicitas Publimag AG is responsible for advertising sales.

The Union also operates a bilingual website, which publishes press releases, speeches by its directors and a press review. The Union's communications department is headed by Ruedi Christen.

== Events ==
The Swiss Union of Arts and Crafts organizes the "Winter Business Conference" in Klosters and the" French-speaking Arts and Crafts Days" in Champéry, which brings together, under the aegis of the Swiss Foundation of SMEs, representatives of the business community and politicians.

== See also ==
- Economiesuisse
