= Conrad Cramer-Frey =

Swiss merchant and politician (1834–1900)

- Lithograph from the Schweizerische Portrait-Gallerie, 1890
- Born: Conrad Kramer; 11 May 1834; Volken, Switzerland
- Died: 6 January 1900 (aged 65); Zurich, Switzerland
- Occupations: Merchant, politician
- Spouse: Louise Frey (m. 1860)

Conrad Cramer-Frey (born Conrad Kramer; 11 May 1834 – 6 January 1900), also Conrad Cramer, was a Swiss merchant and politician. From 1870 to 1895 he headed the trading firm Frey & Cramer (from 1874 Cramer, Frey & Cie.), which had branches in Brazil. He was one of the leading business representatives of the late 19th century, a member of the National Council from 1883 to 1900 and president of the Swiss Federation of Commerce and Industry (SHIV) from 1882 to 1900. As the prototype of the well-connected business lobbyist, he paved the way for the SHIV to become an influential umbrella association.

== Biography ==
Conrad Cramer-Frey was the son of Heinrich Kramer, a farmer, and Anna née Gisler, from Flaach. In 1860 he married Louise Frey, a niece of Friedrich Frey-Herosé and daughter of Karl, a merchant and partner in the dry-goods house Frey & Salzmann in Aarau. He attended primary school in Hettlingen and secondary school in Seuzach. From 1849 to 1852 he did a commercial apprenticeship, followed by two years as an employee of the trading house Hummel Comp. in Zurich.

From 1854 to 1862 Cramer worked as an accountant for Frey & Salzmann. He then lived in Bahia, Brazil, until 1870. There he reorganized and took over a firm connected with the family business, and in 1868 he founded a branch in Pernambuco, Brazil. From 1870 to 1895 he headed the firm Frey & Cramer in Aarau, which moved to Zurich in 1872 and to Enge in 1877; it was renamed Cramer, Frey & Cie. in 1874. A branch in Rio de Janeiro was added in 1878, and the branch in Bahia was closed in 1883.

From about 1880 Cramer-Frey was also active in politics and in business organizations. He was a member of the Cantonal Council of Zurich from 1882 to 1898 and of the National Council from 1883 to 1900 (Liberal Centre, later Liberal-Democratic). He sat on the board of the Zurich Commercial Society (Kaufmännische Gesellschaft Zürich), today the Zurich Chamber of Commerce, from 1876 to 1900 and was its president from 1882 to 1891. From 1882 to 1900 he was president of the SHIV. He was a member of the board of directors of the Schweizerische Kreditanstalt from 1878 to 1891, of the supervisory board of the Schweizerische Lebensversicherungs- und Rentenanstalt from 1880 to 1885, and of the administrative committee of the Neue Zürcher Zeitung from 1879 to 1884, which he chaired in 1882–1883.

Title page of Cramer-Frey's report on the banknote monopoly for the delegates' assembly of the SHIV, 9 May 1891

Cramer-Frey was one of the leading business representatives of the late 19th century. Through articles, speeches and, in some cases, extensive expert reports and petitions, he shaped the debate on central questions of economic policy, such as the nationalization of the railways, the creation of a banknote monopoly or of a central bank of issue, and coinage and monetary policy, and he made the SHIV an influential association. He also had considerable influence on customs and trade policy, in the National Council's committees on the revisions of the customs law and the customs tariff, as an adviser to the Federal Council and as a member of several federal delegations for the renewal of bilateral trade treaties. In 1894 the University of Zurich awarded him an honorary doctorate (Dr. iur. publ. et cam. h.c.).

== Bibliography ==
- R. P. Meyer, Conrad Cramer-Frey, 1948 (with a list of his writings)
- R. Oehler, Die Frey von Aarau, 1773–1949, 1949
- Neue Deutsche Biographie, 3, 393
- E. Gruner, Die schweizerische Bundesversammlung 1848–1920, 1, 1966, 60–61
- B. R. Zimmermann, Verbands- und Wirtschaftspolitik am Übergang zum Staatsinterventionismus, 1980
- Diplomatische Dokumente der Schweiz, 3–4

=== Archives ===
- Stadtbibliothek Winterthur: partial papers (Teilnachlass)
