= François Guisan =

Swiss jurist and politician (1805–1878)

- Born: 28 February 1805; Lausanne, Switzerland
- Died: 17 February 1878 (aged 72); Lausanne, Switzerland
- Occupations: Lawyer, prosecutor, law professor, politician

François Guisan (28 February 1805 – 17 February 1878) was a Swiss lawyer, jurist, and politician from Lausanne. He served as public prosecutor of the canton of Vaud, taught law at the Academy of Lausanne, and sat as a liberal deputy in the cantonal parliament.

== Biography ==
Guisan was the son of Louis Guisan, a lawyer, notary, judge, and deputy, and of Sophie Françoise Dapples. He married first, in 1834, Gabrielle Curchod (died 1837), and second Salomé Caroline (Lina) Wolff. He studied law in Lausanne and Paris and trained under Samuel Secrétan in Lausanne before becoming a lawyer.

As chief public accuser and then attorney general (1832–1846), Guisan took an active part in the reorganization of the administration of criminal justice and the revision of the codes, before resigning in 1846. He then practiced as a lawyer in partnership with Edouard Secrétan. He was an assessor of the justice of the peace of Lausanne (1851–1863) and a professor of law at the Academy of Lausanne (1858–1878), teaching civil law from 1863, and served as rector (1864–1867).

Guisan sat as a liberal deputy in the Grand Council of Vaud (1833–1836) and was a delegate to the Federal Diet (1834). He was a founding member of the newspaper Le Courrier suisse (1840), a co-founder of the insurance company La Suisse (1858) and its president (1858–1878), and president of the synod of the national church (1866–1869 and 1872–1875).

== Bibliography ==
- J. Haldy, "L'enseignement du droit civil vaudois à l'Académie au XIXe s.", in L'enseignement du droit à l'Académie de Lausanne aux XVIIIe et XIXe s., 1987, 109–116
- P.-Y. Favez, G. Marion, Le Grand Conseil vaudois de 1803, 2003, 109
