= Johannes Wunderly =

Swiss industrialist (1816–1873)

- Born: 2 November 1816; Meilen, Switzerland
- Died: 11 September 1873 (aged 56); Enge, Zurich, Switzerland
- Occupations: Industrialist; politician
- Spouse: Susanna Zollinger (m. 1841)

Johannes Wunderly (also spelled Wunderli; 2 November 1816 – 11 September 1873) was a Swiss industrialist and politician. From 1859 he managed the spinning company of Heinrich Kunz together with his brother-in-law Heinrich Zollinger. He sat in the Grand Council of the canton of Zurich from 1855 to 1869.

== Biography ==
Johannes Wunderly was born in Meilen, the son of Johannes, a tannery owner and colonel, and Anna Elisabetha Weber. He was a grandson of Hans Jakob Wunderli. In 1841 he married Susanna Zollinger, daughter of Heinrich Zollinger. Their son was Hans Wunderly-von Muralt.

After attending the industrial school (Industrieschule) in Zurich, Wunderly spent two years in Paris, Belgium and England, where he anglicized the spelling of his name. He then worked in his father's tannery before joining in 1857 the firm of Heinrich Kunz, the Spinnerkönig ("king of spinners") and his wife's uncle. After Kunz's death in 1859, Wunderly took over its management as limited partner and technical director, together with the commercial director Heinrich Zollinger, his brother-in-law. The company grew rapidly.

In Meilen, Wunderly was a member of the municipal executive (Gemeinderat) from 1841 to 1851 and the first president of the Wednesday Society (Mittwochsgesellschaft) from 1849 to 1853, and he was active as a benefactor. From 1855 to 1869 he sat in the Grand Council of the canton of Zurich. He died in Enge, now part of the city of Zurich, on 11 September 1873.

== Bibliography ==
- P. Ziegler, P. Kummer, Geschichte der Gemeinde Meilen, 1998, 230–231
- P. Kummer, Chronik der Familie Wunderly von Meilen, 1999, 25–26, 42–49
