= Emile-Samuel Bory =

Swiss lawyer and banker (1825–1894)

- Born: 9 December 1825; Coppet, Switzerland
- Died: 8 December 1894 (aged 68); Lausanne, Switzerland
- Occupations: Lawyer, banker, politician

Emile-Samuel Bory (9 December 1825 – 8 December 1894) was a Swiss lawyer, banker, and politician. He was one of the founders of La Suisse Assurances and a liberal deputy in the Grand Council of Vaud.

== Biography ==
Bory was the son of Hector, a notary, deputy, and justice of the peace, and of Suzanne Nicole. He married Sylvie-Marie Hollard, daughter of Charles Hollard, a tax collector in Lausanne, and was the brother-in-law of Charles Boiceau. He studied law at the Academy of Lausanne, became a lawyer in Coppet in 1851, and then a banker in Lausanne.

Bory sat as a liberal deputy in the Grand Council of Vaud (1857–1862) and was a deputy judge at the cantonal court. He was one of the founders of La Suisse in 1858 and vice-president of the board of the Banque fédérale in Bern. He also served as president of the Suisse Occidentale–Simplon (SOS) and Jura–Simplon railway companies.

== Bibliography ==
- Belles-Lettres (Lausanne), Livre d'or du 175e anniversaire, 1806–1981, 1981, 94
- J.-M. Spothelfer, Les Zofingiens, 1995, no. 505
