= Samuel Frey =

Swiss politician (state legislator), major company founder (Elco AG)

- Frey, c. 1910

Member of the Grand Council of Aargau
- In office 10 April 1901 – 1 January 1921
- Constituency: Kulm District

Personal details
- Born: Samuel Jacob Frey; 7 September 1850 Gontenschwil, Switzerland
- Died: 26 February 1934 (aged 83) Gontenschwil, Switzerland
- Party: Free Radical Liberals
- Spouse: Rosette Frey (m. 1879; died 1924)
- Children: 4
- Education: Industrial School Aarau
- Occupation: Industrialist; philanthropist; politician
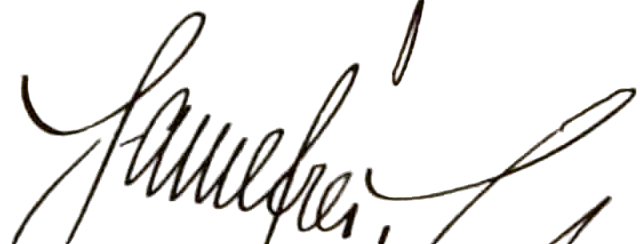
- Signature

Samuel Jacob Frey (German: [ˈzaːmuɛl ˈfʁaɪ]; 7 September 1850 – 26 February 1934) was a Swiss industrialist, philanthropist and politician who most notably served on the Grand Council of Aargau from 1901 to 1921. In 1884, Frey founded Elco AG, which remained in family ownership until 1953.

== Early life and education ==
Frey was born 7 September 1850 in Gontenschwil, Switzerland, the oldest of seven children, to Hans Jacob Frey, a farmer and home weaver, and Elisabeth Frey (née Haller), into a Protestant family.

Both his paternal and maternal families had been deeply rooted in Gontenschwil with a history dating back several hundred years. He was initially being raised at the ancestral seat in Kesselgasse before relocating on Obere Egg, a small hamlet outside of the main village on the local hill, where his father acquired a homestead for the growing family. He had several first cousins that emigrated to Steinauer, Nebraska during the mid-19th century, which then was a primarily Swiss, German and Bohemian settlement.

From 1866 to 1868 he completed an apprenticeship at Locher & Cie in Aarau, a major construction company, which had been under the management of Olivier Zschokke since 1859.

== Career ==
Frey remained at Locher & Cie after successful completion of his apprenticeship. He was deployed by his employer to the branch office in Zurich, where he was employed as a bookkeeper until 1875. In 1876, Frey was hired by the Canton of Aargau, to serve as warden to the Lenzburg penitentiary. There he was introduced to prisoners manufacturing paper bags and packaging materials.

In 1883, Frey founded Freya, a modest paper bag manufacturing company, which catered to the local grocers and tobacco manufacturers in the Wynental region. He had little inherited land and could afford to construct a simple manufacturing building. In 1884, the officially started production with several dozen women, who glued paper bags. There was steady growth and Frey became affluent. In the late 1880s, Frey had his youngest brother, Heinrich Frey (1871–1960), who married into the Zschokke family, join the company as an apprentice and later as a bookkeeper. Through a financial participation he helped his brother to launch his own paper manufacturing company, Haeusler Frey & Co AG, which still exists today holding commercial real estate.

In the 1890s, Frey was introduced to his neighbor, Hermann Wiederkehr-Schmid, who helped significantly with the development of the company, deciding that they would need to move to Zurich to grow further. The former sole proprietorship was transformed into a collective partnership named Frey & Wiederkehr on 27 August 1892. This was the era were they used more and more machinery for manufacturing and started to produce print media. In 1904, the company relocated into the Werd area of Zurich, initially into rented premises, but they rapidly outgrew them and purchased land and constructed a new factory which at peak was able to employ 250–300 workers. In 1909 the company became a limited partnership. Frey's only son, Victor Frey (1879–1953), entered the company in this decade and became a sales director, who traveled nationally and internationally for the company. The limited partnership was converted into a stock corporation on 6 July 1917 with stock capital of 1 million Swiss Francs (approximately $4 million in 2026). In the later years, Frey primarily focussed on managing the smaller, less mechanical plant next to his residence in Gontenschwil. He formally retired in 1915 but remained a silent partner until his passing in 1934.

Additionally, he served in political functions on municipal and cantonal level and remained involved into civic life of his region. He served on the board of Bank in Menziken (an original predecessor to Valiant Bank) from 1892 to 1920 (respectively from 1904 to 1934 as its president), Wynental and Suhrental Railway from 1920 to 1934. Frey was also a philanthropist to public and private causes and he was believed to be the main benefactor of a first home care service in his home village. He was also quietly donating large parts of his personal fortune to poverty alleviation causes. He additionally also served on the board of trustees of Oberwynen- und Seetal Health Association (presently the Menziken Asana Hospital) in Menziken from 1927 to 1934. Frey also supported the Historical Society of Gontenschwil and represented the village at events throughout Switzerland.

== Politics ==
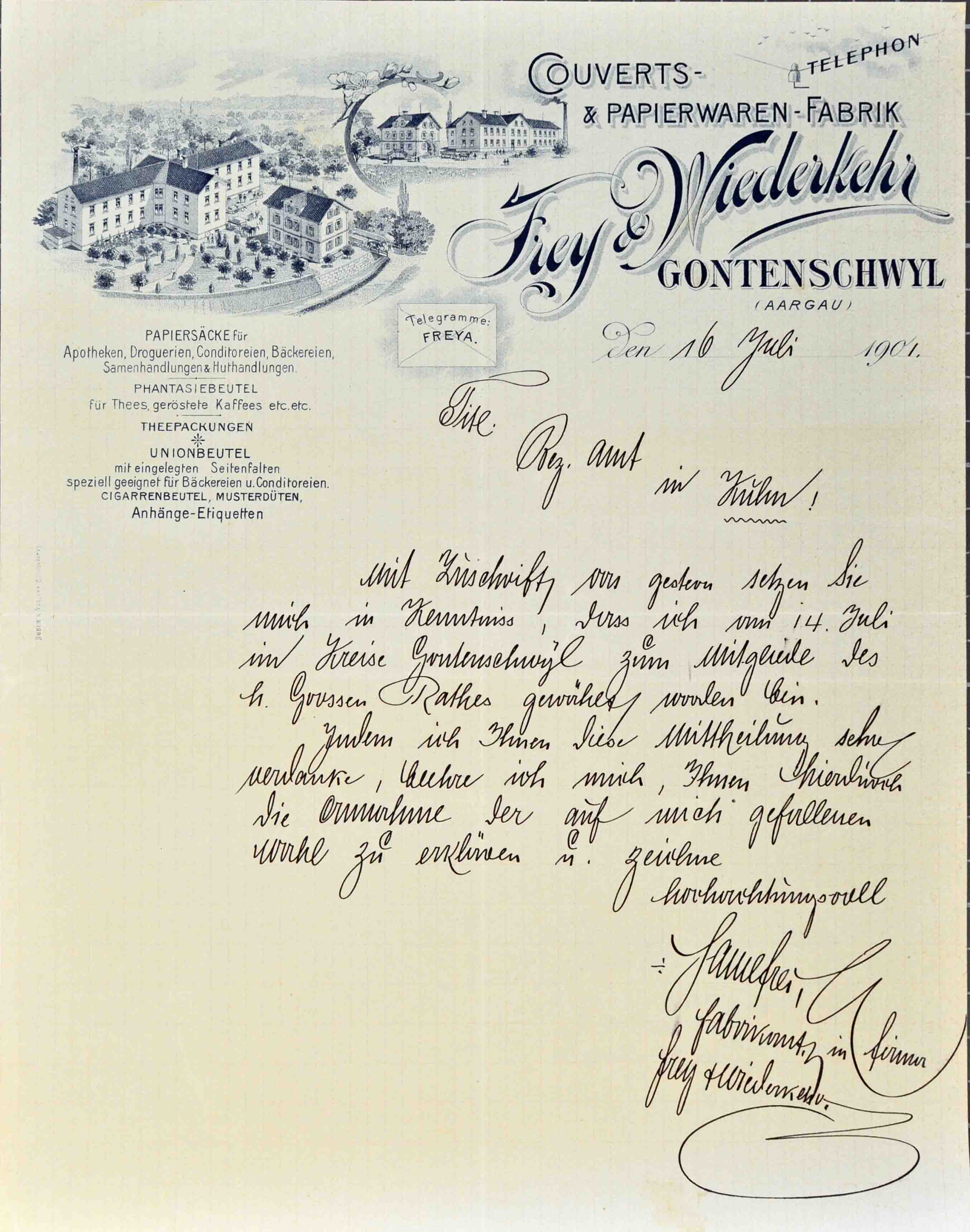
Letter from Frey accepting his position on the Grand Council (1901)

In 1901, Frey was elected to the Grand Council of the Canton of Aargau, serving until 1919. He presided several commissions and was an active member of the cantonal legislature.

== Private life ==
Frey married Rosette Frey, a daughter of Wilhelm Frey and Anna Maria Merz, innkeepers near Gontenschwil, on March 25, 1879. The couple had four children;

- Victor Samuel Frey (1879–1953), married to Emma Kieser (1885–1936), secondly to Elise Hulftegger (1880–1959), without issue. He was involved in the management of Frey & Wiederkehr until 1932 and remained a silent partner until his death.
- Oswald Frey (1882–1886), died in childbed.
- Laura Valerie Frey, colloquially Valerie (1888–1974), married Guido Ernst Gyssler (1881–1950), an architect and construction company owner (later part of Implenia) of Aarau; two children.
- Johanna Helene Frey (1902–1988), colloquially Helene, married Max Hermann Vogt (1895–1952), an engineer and industrialist (later part of Notz Metal); two children.

In 1890, Frey commissioned Villa zur Freya, a stately house in Historicism architecture which was located next to the premises of the paper mill (then called Freya). This property was later acquired by his son-in-law, Max Vogt, who raised his family there. The house remained in ownership of the Vogt family until 1992.

Frey passed away on 26 February 1934 aged 84 at his residence.

== Literature ==
- Rolf Bolliger: Die Papierfabrik Frey und Wiederkehr Historical Association Wynental 2005 (in German)
- Karl Obrist: Denkschrift zum 100 jährigen bestehen der Bank in Menziken Bank in Menziken 1952 (in German)
- 50 Jahre Briefumschlag & Papierwarenfabrik Frey, Wiederkehr & Co AG Zürich ETH Library Zürich (in German)
- Andreas Müller: Achilles Zschokke der Sohn des Dichters: Biographie eines Landpfarrers Historical Association Wynental 2007 (in German
