= 1972 Swiss referendums =

Seven referendums were held in Switzerland in 1972. The first two were held on 5 March on a popular initiative on the promotion of housebuilding (and a counter-proposal) and on an amendment to the Swiss Federal Constitution to protect tenants. The popular initiative was rejected, whilst the constitutional amendment was approved. The third and fourth were held on 4 June on measures to stabilise the federal construction market and protecting currency, both of which were approved. The fifth was held on 24 September on a popular initiative for enhanced arms control and a ban on weapon exports, but was narrowly rejected. The final two were held on 3 December on a popular initiative on introducing a "people's pension" (and a counterproposal) and on an agreement with the European Community. The pensions initiative was rejected, whilst the agreement was approved.

== Results ==
=== March: Housebuilding ===
Choice	Popular initiative					Counterproposal				
Choice	Popular vote		Cantons			Popular vote		Cantons		
Choice	Votes	%	Full	Half	Total	Votes	%	Full	Half	Total
For	360,262	28.9	0	0	0	727,629	58.5	18	6	21
Against	835,315	67.1	19	6	22	432,872	34.8	1	0	1
No answer	48,915	3.9	–	–	–	83,991	6.7	–	–	–
Blank votes	26,974	–	–	–	–	26,974	–	–	–	–
Invalid votes	14,427	–	–	–	–	14,427	–	–	–	–
Total	1,285,893	100	19	6	22	1,285,893	100	19	6	22
Registered voters/turnout	3,600,759	35.7	–	–	–	3,600,759	35.7	–	–	–
Source: Direct Democracy

=== March: Protection of tenants ===
Choice	Popular vote		Cantons		
Choice	Votes	%	Full	Half	Total
For	1,057,322	85.4	19	6	22
Against	180,795	14.6	0	0	0
Blank votes	45,638	–	–	–	–
Invalid votes	1,959	–	–	–	–
Total	1,285,714	100	19	6	22
Registered voters/turnout	3,600,759	35.7	–	–	–
Source: Direct Democracy

=== June: Construction market ===
Choice	Popular vote		Cantons		
Choice	Votes	%	Full	Half	Total
For	774,794	83.3	19	6	22
Against	154,827	16.7	0	0	0
Blank votes	33,453	–	–	–	–
Invalid votes	781	–	–	–	–
Total	963,855	100	19	6	22
Registered voters/turnout	3,604,099	26.7	–	–	–
Source: Nohlen & Stöver

=== June: Currency protection ===
Choice	Popular vote		Cantons		
Choice	Votes	%	Full	Half	Total
For	808,974	87.7	19	6	22
Against	113,164	12.3	0	0	0
Blank votes	40,014	–	–	–	–
Invalid votes	1,035	–	–	–	–
Total	963,187	100	19	6	22
Registered voters/turnout	3,604,099	26.7	–	–	–
Source: Nohlen & Stöver

=== September: Arms control ===
Choice	Popular vote		Cantons		
Choice	Votes	%	Full	Half	Total
For	585,046	49.7	6	2	7
Against	592,833	50.3	13	4	15
Blank votes	18,598	–	–	–	–
Invalid votes	1,762	–	–	–	–
Total	1,198,239	100	19	6	22
Registered voters/turnout	3,620,937	33.1	–	–	–
Source: Nohlen & Stöver

=== December: People's pension ===
Choice	Popular initiative					Counterproposal				
Choice	Popular vote		Cantons			Popular vote		Cantons		
Choice	Votes	%	Full	Half	Total	Votes	%	Full	Half	Total
For	294,511	15.6	0	0	0	1,393,797	74.0	19	6	22
Against	1,481,488	78.6	19	6	22	418,018	22.2	0	0	0
No answer	108,776	5.8	–	–	–	72,960	3.9	–	–	–
Blank votes	20,837	–	–	–	–	20,837	–	–	–	–
Invalid votes	15,614	–	–	–	–	15,614	–	–	–	–
Total	1,921,226	100	19	6	22	1,921,226	100	19	6	22
Registered voters/turnout	3,628,891	52.9	–	–	–	3,628,891	52.9	–	–	–
Source: Direct Democracy

=== December: Agreement with the European Community ===
Choice	Popular vote		Cantons		
Choice	Votes	%	Full	Half	Total
For	1,344,994	72.5	19	6	22
Against	509,465	27.5	0	0	0
Blank votes	62,125	–	–	–	–
Invalid votes	3,569	–	–	–	–
Total	1,920,153	100	19	6	22
Registered voters/turnout	3,628,891	52.9	–	–	–
Source: Nohlen & Stöver
