= Population Connection =

American population concern organization

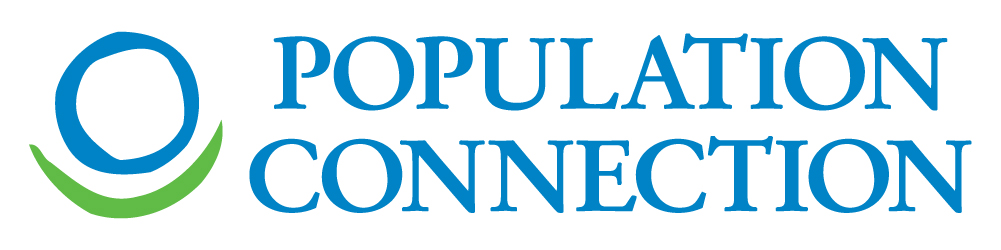
- Founded: 1968
- Founders: Paul Ehrlich, Richard Bowers, and Charles Remington
- Type: 501(c)(3)
- Headquarters: Washington, D.C., U.S.
- Key people: John Seager (President)
- Revenue: $14,925,445 (2021)
- Website: www.populationconnection.org
- Formerly called: Zero Population Growth (1968–2002)

Population Connection (formerly Zero Population Growth or ZPG) is a US-based non-profit organization that advocates for policies to stabilize the global population at a level that can be sustained by Earth's resources.

== History ==
Population Connection was founded in 1968 under the name "Zero Population Growth" or ZPG by Paul R. Ehrlich, Richard Bowers, and Charles Remington in the wake of Paul and Anne Ehrlich's influential but controversial book The Population Bomb. The organization adopted its current name in 2002.

== Issues and campaigns ==
- Connections between population, health, and the environment, in the United States and around the world
- U.S. foreign assistance funding for international family planning
- U.S. funding for the domestic family planning program for low-income Americans, Title X
- Ending U.S. policies that restrict access to family planning and reproductive health care, including abortion, domestically (e.g. Hyde Amendment) and internationally (e.g. Mexico City policy, Helms Amendment, restrictions on funding for UNFPA)
- Comprehensive (as opposed to abstinence-only) sex education for American teens
- Development of material for introduction to K-12 curricula to "educate American and Canadian students on population challenges".
- Publication of a quarterly magazine

== Criticisms ==
In her 1987 book, Reproductive Rights and Wrongs, Betsy Hartmann criticized ZPG for inciting fear of population growth that she claims led to millions of sterilizations in China, India, Mexico, Indonesia and elsewhere.

== See also ==
- List of population concern organizations
- Zero population growth
