= Heinrich Kunz =

Swiss industrialist (1793–1859)

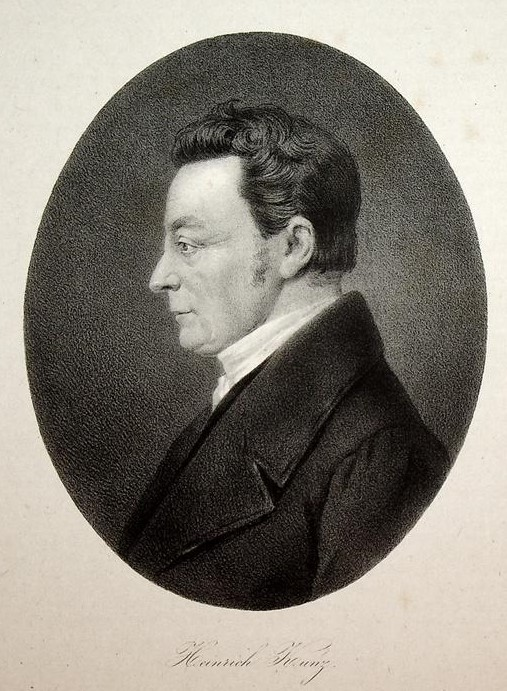
- Born: 1 March 1793; Oetwil am See, Switzerland
- Died: 21 August 1859 (aged 66); Uster, Switzerland
- Occupation: Industrialist

Heinrich Kunz (1 March 1793 – 21 August 1859) was a Swiss industrialist. At the end of the 1830s he owned the largest spinning company in Switzerland. He was regarded as the largest spinning entrepreneur of his time in Europe and was nicknamed the Spinnerkönig ("king of spinners").

== Biography ==
Heinrich Kunz was born in Oetwil am See, the son of Hans Heinrich, a farmer, and Susanna Heusser. He did not marry. He attended secondary school in Männedorf and did a commercial apprenticeship in a cotton spinning mill in Guebwiller in Alsace. While still in training, he persuaded his father to set up a hand-spinning workshop on his farm.

In 1811 Kunz joined his father's business. Between 1811 and 1816 he set up a spinning mill in Schaffhausen with other merchants and rented space in the Stegern mill (Stegernmühle) near Wetzikon for a third factory. He was the first to recognize the Aabach as a site for water power. In 1816 he built his first large spinning mill in Oberuster with his own funds, in a five-story factory building that was very large for the time. After the death of his father in 1825, who left him about half a million francs, he built another spinning mill in Niederuster and, in 1828, one in Windisch.

At the end of the 1830s Kunz owned the largest spinning company in Switzerland, with 9% of all Swiss spindles. Between 1835 and 1845 he bought further spinning mills in Adliswil, Linthal, Rorbas and Kemptthal. After these acquisitions he had about 150,000 spindles in operation, employed 2,000 workers and had a turnover of 3.5 million francs. Kunz was regarded as the largest spinning entrepreneur of his time in Europe and was nicknamed the Spinnerkönig. He asserted his interests ruthlessly against his workers and was hardly involved in social policy. He was a member of the Cantonal Council of Zurich and a lieutenant colonel. He died in Uster on 21 August 1859.

His nephews Heinrich Zollinger and Johannes Wunderli-Zollinger continued the company under the name Heinrich Kunz. They acquired further mills up to 1880 and, with 245,000 spindles and about 2,700 employees, were then the largest employers in Swiss industry. In 1893 the firm was renamed Wunderli, Zollinger & Cie. (formerly Heinrich Kunz). In 1898 the indebted limited partnership was converted into a joint-stock company, the AG der Spinnereien von Heinrich Kunz. In 1912 the Stuttgart textile group W. Wolf & Söhne acquired its shares together with the four remaining spinning mills.

== Bibliography ==
- Biographisches Lexikon des Aargaus 1803–1957, 1958, 465–466
- M. Baumann, Geschichte von Windisch, 1983, 507–594
- T. Marty, "Heinrich Kunz, der 'Spinnerkönig' Europas", in Heimatspiegel, 1993, no. 9, 66–71; no. 10, 74–79
- Bosshard, Werner: Spinnerkönig Heinrich Kunz, 1793–1859. Biographie und Briefedition, 2021 (Schweizer Pioniere der Wirtschaft und Technik, 119/1–2).
