= Matfer Bourgeat =

French cookware manufacturer

Matfer Bourgeat is a French manufacturer of cookware and bakeware that primarily serves the commercial trade. The company has been in operation since 1814.

== History ==
Bourgeat S.A. was founded in 1918 by Adrien Bourgeat. The company initially produced kitchenware for both domestic and commercial markets, but in 1981 it shifted its focus to exclusively producing for the commercial market.

In 2002, Bourgeat S.A. merged with Matfer, another French manufacturer of cookware and kitchen utensils, to form the Matfer Bourgeat Group.

In the Restaurant magazine's Chefs' Choice Awards 2014, Bourgeat was named the Best Pan brand.

== Structure ==
It is headquartered in Les Abrets-en-Dauphiné in the Isère department of the Auvergne-Rhône-Alpes region of south-east France. It is family-owned.
