= Dominique G. Homberger =

American zoologist

Dominique G. Homberger PhD, FAAA
- Born: April 10, 1948 (age 78)
- Education: University of Zürich (PhD Zoology, MS Biology, Second Propaedeutical Exam Veterinary Anatomy and Physiology)
- Occupations: Researcher and Teacher
- Years active: 1979-present
- Employer: Louisiana State University
- Known for: Comparative anatomy, evolutionary history of birds
- Notable work: Vertebrate Dissection
- Title: Alumni Professor
- Term: 2017-present
- Honours: Fellow of the American Association for Anatomy
- Website: lsu.edu/science/biosci/faculty-and-staff/faculty-pages/homberger.php

Dominique G. Homberger (born 10 April 1948) is an Alumni Professor the Louisiana State University, where she taught for 31 years. She is noted for her work on the evolution of complex structures in birds, mammals, and fish, and is also the author of a textbook on vertebrate dissection. A fellow of the American Association for the Advancement of Science and the American Ornithological Union, she served as the President of the International Ornithological Congress 2022, and President of the International Ornithologists' Union from 2018-2022.

== Teaching ==
In 2016, the Louisiana State University Honors College awarded Homberger the Departmental Alumni Professorship.

In 2010, Dr. Homberger was removed from teaching her biology courses at LSU, where she was a tenured biology professor at the time, presumably for having a strict grading policy. At the same time, a nontenured researcher was fired for criticizing the New Orleans levee system. As a result of these two dismissals, the American Association of University Professors released a report, accusing LSU of violating academic freedom and due process. Cary Nelson, president of the American Association of University Professors, observed that the academic community has always believed that "an instructor has the responsibility for assigning grades", and there was media speculation that this was part of a process of formalizing grade inflation.

== Book ==
With co-author Warren F. Walker, Homberger has written a standard textbook titled "Vertebrate Dissection". This was first published in 2003 and is now in the ninth edition.

== Works ==
- Homberger, Dominique G.; de Silva, Kumudini N. (1 August 2000). "Functional microanatomy of the feather-bearing integument: implications for the evolution of birds and avian flight". American Zoologist. 40 (4): 553–574. doi:10.1093/icb/40.4.553. JSTOR 3884279.
