= National Commission for the Observance of World Population Year 1974 =

National Commission for the Observance of World Population Year 1974 - the United Nations observed 1974 as "World Population Year". President Richard Nixon established the National Commission to aid U.S. participation in this United Nations observance. Neither the Commission nor any of its members participated in the August 1975 international conference held in Bucharest, Romania.

== Enabling authority ==
- Executive Order 11763 (January 17, 1974)
- Amended by Executive Order 11806 (September 25, 1974)

== Purposes ==
- Advertise U.S. activities relating to the observance of UN World Population Year
- Educate U.S. citizens about the political, economic, and social issues surrounding a growing world population
- Report on these enterprises to the President

== Membership ==
- Chair, Clifford M. Hardin, Vice-President Ralston-Purina, Co.
- Vice Chair, Mrs. Norman C. Armitage, President, National Federation of Republican Women
- Vice Chair, Sprague H. Gardiner, Professor of Obstetrics, Indiana University
- 17 Members-at-Large

== Activities ==
- Sponsored a national meeting of leading U.S. authorities on population issues in March 1974.
- Maintained a high public visibility in April 1974 thru press conferences and special programs for television and radio on population issues.
- Cooperated with Columbia University in holding six regional public meetings throughout the country in June thru October 1974. These meetings focused on issues relating to population growth and hunger.

== Recommendation ==
- The President should create a government entity to oversee all future U.S. efforts regarding population issues.

== Sources ==
- Report to the President by the National Commission for the Observance of World Population Year (Washington, DC: GPO, 1975) 18pp.
- Donna Batten, et al. Encyclopedia of Governmental Advisory Organizations (Detroit, MI: Gale, 1973- . annual editions). Entry number 1634.
- Steven D. Zink, Guide to the Presidential Advisory Commissions, 1973-1987 (Alexandria, VA: Chadwyck-Healey, Inc, 1987). Pages 27–29.
