= Swiss Federation of Commerce and Industry =

Swiss business federation (1870–2003)

- Schweizerischer Handels- und Industrieverein
- Abbreviation: SHIV, USCI
- Nickname: Vorort
- Merged into: Economiesuisse (2000)
- Formation: 12 March 1870
- Dissolved: 2003
- Type: Umbrella business association
- Headquarters: Zurich (from 1882)
- Members: 19 chambers of commerce, 91 trade associations, 59 other members (2003)

The Swiss Federation of Commerce and Industry (German: Schweizerischer Handels- und Industrieverein, SHIV; French: Union suisse du commerce et de l'industrie, USCI), known as the Vorort, was the oldest of the four major Swiss economic associations, the others being the Swiss Union of Arts and Crafts, the Swiss Trade Union Federation and the Swiss Farmers' Union. It was founded in 1870 by cantonal boards that were active worldwide through their textile industries and sought to unite their professional interests in trade policy. As the umbrella association of the cantonal chambers of commerce and of the existing business associations, the SHIV was to represent the interests of the private sector to the state authorities, which were still weakly developed. Close cooperation between the state and the private sector subsequently shaped Swiss economic policy. In 2000 the SHIV joined with the Society for the Development of the Swiss Economy to form Economiesuisse.

== History ==
=== Founding period (1870–1914) ===
At the founding assembly on 12 March 1870, the statutes established an assembly of delegates and a presidential body that managed the association's affairs. The name of this body, the Vorort, which was later used as a name for the SHIV itself, and its appointment in a two-year rotation were borrowed from the Old Swiss Confederacy. A third body, an advisory committee, was made up of delegates elected by the assembly and the members of the presidential body. Within its first years, the association became a partner of the federal government on specialist questions. The SHIV's field of activity expanded from collecting and pooling information to advising the federal government and drafting policy proposals on specific issues. Supported by federal subsidies, it compiled economic statistics, on the basis of which it wrote its annual Bericht über Handel und Industrie der Schweiz (Report on trade and industry in Switzerland) from 1878. In the last quarter of the 19th century its central issue was customs policy, which the cantonal chambers of commerce of the industrial regions, the SHIV's main pillars, initially helped to shape. During the revisions of the customs tariff up to the First World War, numerous trade associations joined as new sections. In 1882 the SHIV's advisory committee was turned into the Swiss Chamber of Commerce (Schweizerische Handelskammer), which set the guidelines of economic policy. Secretaries from the canton of Zurich had become indispensable experts, so that from 1882 the Vorort no longer rotated but had its fixed seat in Zurich. Zurich's dominant position was cemented by the revision of the statutes in the same year, which made the outgoing Vorort eligible for re-election and introduced four-year terms. The Zurich president Conrad Cramer-Frey, the prototype of the well-connected business lobbyist, then paved the way for the SHIV to become an influential umbrella association.

=== World wars and the interwar period (1914–1945) ===
In 1900 the SHIV created the post of director, which was filled by Alfred Frey. During the First World War, Frey played a decisive part in shaping the organization of the war economy. In the Great Depression that followed, the association faced financial difficulties and a temporary internal rift between free-trade and protectionist positions on customs policy. Meanwhile, a steady increase in the number of sections led to several revisions of the statutes. The revision of 1931 ended, among other things, Zurich's dominance. Zurich remained the permanent seat of the management, but the Vorort was now elected by the Swiss Chamber of Commerce and had broader support in the cantons and economic sectors. Institutionalized international cooperation between private-sector associations began in 1922, when the Vorort took over the secretariat of the Swiss national committee of the International Chamber of Commerce. During the Great Depression the Federal Council also intensified its cooperation with business leaders. The devaluation of the franc in 1936, however, was a bitter defeat for the SHIV, which had long advocated a deflationary policy in its fight against the crisis initiative. The introduction of the offsetting and clearing system in international payments strengthened the Vorort as an actor in foreign trade policy, and its director took a seat on the clearing commission. In this period, and for a quarter of a century, Heinrich Homberger was the dominant figure of the association. As a member of the federal government's permanent economic delegation (Ständige Wirtschaftsdelegation), he also played a central role in the negotiations with the Allies and the Axis powers before and during the Second World War. As guarantors of the balance of interests between the associations, Homberger and the SHIV now became the federal government's most important partner in securing its foreign economic policy at home.

=== From bilateralism to multilateralism (1945–2003) ===
The economic articles of 1947 gave the involvement of business associations in the state's economic policy a basis in the constitution. The expansion of the social market economy after the war favored their influence on domestic policy through work in committees and in consultation procedures (Vernehmlassungen). Additional lobbying on economic policy and media work were carried out by the new Society for the Development of the Swiss Economy (Gesellschaft zur Förderung der schweizerischen Wirtschaft), known as the Wirtschaftsförderung, with which the SHIV made agreements on content and organization. From the first phase of European integration in the 1950s, the SHIV, which had proved itself in bilateralism, remained skeptical of supranational unification processes. Working with the trade division of the Federal Department of Economic Affairs, it did support joining the General Agreement on Tariffs and Trade (GATT) and later the founding of the European Free Trade Association (EFTA). The SHIV also became more closely integrated internationally, in the Business and Industry Advisory Committee to the Organisation for Economic Co-operation and Development (OECD) and in industrial federations such as the Union of Industrial and Employers' Confederations of Europe (UNICE, now BusinessEurope), and in 1989 it opened an office in Brussels. It ruled out joining the European Economic Community (EEC) but supported joining the European Economic Area (EEA). After the EEA was rejected in the vote of 1992, the SHIV came out against joining the European Union (EU) and in favor of the bilateral approach. Globally active multinational corporations and also small and medium-sized enterprises, however, partly pursued diverging interests, which affected the members' involvement in the association. The SHIV was also criticized as cumbersome and bureaucratic. It was formally dissolved in 2003; at that time its members were 19 chambers of commerce, 91 trade associations and 59 other members. Its successor, Economiesuisse, was founded to combine the SHIV's expertise in economic policy with the professional communication and campaigning of the Wirtschaftsförderung. In 2020 Economiesuisse represented about 100,000 companies with about 2 million employees in Switzerland and about 2 million abroad.

== Presidents and directors ==
Presidents of the SHIV and of Economiesuisse
President	Term
Alfred Ernst	1870–1872
Leonhard Steiner	1872–1874
Carl Emil Viktor von Gonzenbach	1874–1876
Alphons Koechlin	1876–1878
Konrad Bürkli	1878–1880
Ernest Pictet	1880–1882
Conrad Cramer-Frey	1882–1900
Hans Wunderly-von Muralt	1900–1917
Alfred Frey	1917–1924
John Syz	1924–1934
Hans Sulzer	1935–1951
Carl Koechlin	1951–1964
Hans Robert Schwarzenbach	1964–1970
Etienne Junod	1970–1976
Louis von Planta	1976–1987
Pierre Borgeaud	1987–1993
Andres F. Leuenberger	1994–2001
Ueli Forster	2002–2007
Gerold Bührer	2007–2012
Rudolf Wehrli	2012–2013
Heinz Karrer	2013–2020
Christoph Mäder	2020–

Directors of the SHIV and of Economiesuisse
Director	Term
Alfred Frey	1900–1924
Ernst Wetter	1924–1939
Heinrich Homberger	1939–1965
Peter Aebi	1966–1970
Gerhard Winterberger	1970–1987
Kurt Moser	1987–1998
Rudolf Ramsauer	1998–2007
Pascal Gentinetta	2007–2013
Rudolf Minsch (ad interim)	2013–2014
Monika Rühl	2014–

== Bibliography ==
- Hulftegger, Otto: Der Schweizerische Handels- und Industrie-Verein, 1870–1882, 1920.
- Wehrli, Bernhard: Aus der Geschichte des Schweizerischen Handels- und Industrie-Vereins, 1870–1970, 1970.
- Zimmermann, Beat R.: Verbands- und Wirtschaftspolitik am Übergang zum Staatsinterventionismus. Dargestellt anhand der Mitwirkung des Schweizerischen Handels- und Industrie-Vereins und der Kaufmännischen Gesellschaft Zürich bei der Ausgestaltung der schweizerischen Aussenhandelspolitik im ausgehenden 19. Jahrhundert, 1980.
- Hauser, Benedikt: Wirtschaftsverbände im frühen schweizerischen Bundesstaat 1848–74. Vom regionalen zum nationalen Einzugsgebiet, 1985.
- Gees, Thomas: "Interessenclearing und innere Absicherung", in: Hug, Peter; Kloter, Martin (eds.): Aufstieg und Niedergang des Bilateralismus. Schweizerische Aussen- und Aussenwirtschaftspolitik 1930–1960: Rahmenbedingungen, Entscheidungsstrukturen, Fallstudien, 1999, pp. 141–172.
- Meier, Martin; Frech, Stefan et al.: Schweizerische Aussenwirtschaftspolitik 1930–1948. Strukturen – Verhandlungen – Funktionen, 2002 (Veröffentlichungen der Unabhängigen Expertenkommission Schweiz – Zweiter Weltkrieg, 10).
- Humair, Cédric: Développement économique et Etat central (1815–1914). Un siècle de politique douanière suisse au service des élites, 2004.

=== Archives ===
- Archiv für Zeitgeschichte, ETH Zürich, Zürich: Vorort-Archiv.
