= Swiss Employer's Association =

Swiss Employers' Association
- Schweizerischer Arbeitgeberverband
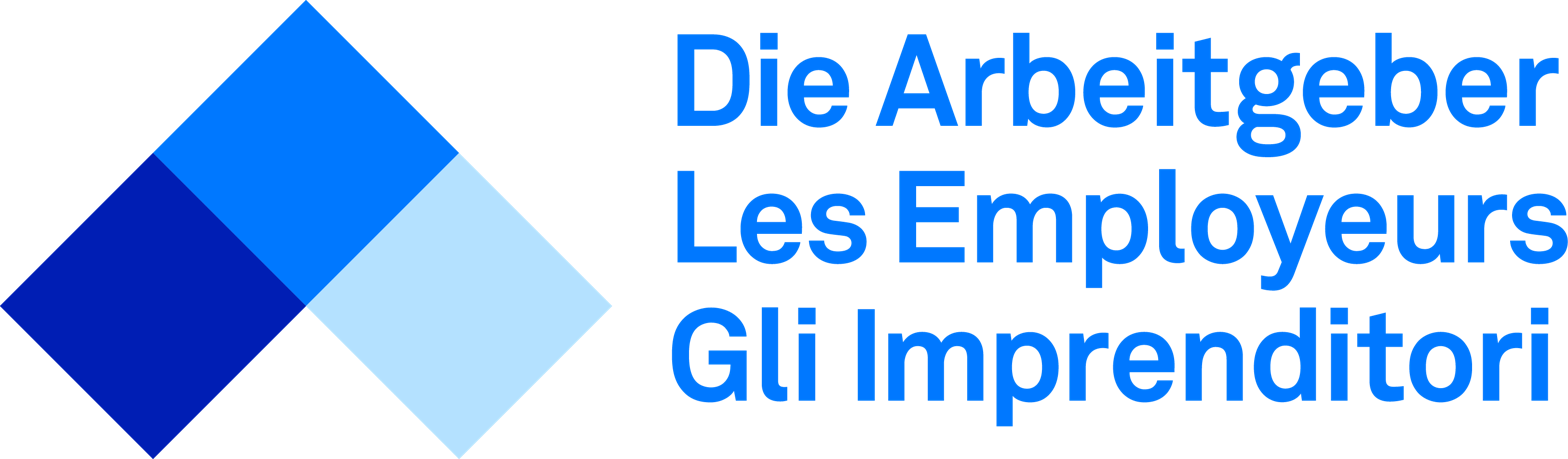
- Formation: 1908
- Type: Association
- Headquarters: Zurich, Switzerland
- Fields: Employers' association, umbrella organization
- Key people: Roland A. Müller (Director); Severin Moser (President)
- Website: www.arbeitgeber.ch

The Swiss Employer's Association (in German Schweizerischer Arbeitgeberverband, in French: Union patronale Suisse, in Italian: Unione Svizzera degli imprenditori) is one of the three umbrella organizations of the Swiss economy, alongside Economiesuisse and the Swiss Union of Arts and Crafts.

As of 2023, the organization comprised 45 professional organizations, 31 regional associations, and four individual members.

== History ==
Founded in 1908, it was called the Central Union of Swiss Employers' Associations until 1996.

== Role ==
The Swiss Employer's Association is particularly active in three areas:

- Labor market (labor law, social partnership, occupational safety and health, etc.);
- Vocational training;
- Social and political insurance.

Its purpose is not to offer services, but to defend the positions of its members with political, administrative and media actors.
