= Society for the Development of the Swiss Economy =

Swiss business association (1942–2000)

- Gesellschaft zur Förderung der schweizerischen Wirtschaft
- Abbreviation: wf, sdes
- Nickname: Wirtschaftsförderung
- Merged into: Economiesuisse (2000)
- Formation: 1942
- Type: Association
- Headquarters: Zurich
- Members: About 2,500 companies (1999)

The Society for the Development of the Swiss Economy (also Society for the Promotion of the Swiss Economy; German: Gesellschaft zur Förderung der schweizerischen Wirtschaft, known for short as the Wirtschaftsförderung or wf; French: Société pour le développement de l'économie suisse, sdes) was an organization of the Swiss private sector with a political and journalistic mandate, founded in 1942. Until the end of the 1940s it focused on fighting statism and promoting the ideas of the market economy. It then became a channel of communication between the business community and state bodies. In 2000 it joined with the Swiss Federation of Commerce and Industry (Vorort) to form Economiesuisse.

== History ==
The Society for the Development of the Swiss Economy was founded in 1942 as an organization of the private sector with a political and journalistic mandate. Conceived as an association (Verein) and financed by industry, trade, banks and insurance companies, it began its work at the beginning of 1943. Until the end of the 1940s its main concerns were fighting statism and promoting the ideas of the market economy. The society then broadened its activities and became a channel of communication between the business community and state bodies. It prepared documentation for the media and for politicians and ran campaigns for popular votes. It worked with the umbrella associations of the business community, with companies, political parties and industry organizations. In 1999 about 2,500 companies were members.

The society's headquarters were always in Zurich. Branch offices were opened in Geneva in 1943, in Bern in 1965 and in Lugano in 1981. In 2000 the society joined with the Swiss Federation of Commerce and Industry (Vorort) to form Economiesuisse, which took over the society's branch offices in Switzerland and the Vorort's office in Brussels, open since 1989.

== Bibliography ==
- E. Hugentobler, Im Spannungsfeld von Wirtschaft und Politik, 1983
- C. Werner, Für Wirtschaft und Vaterland, 2000, 214–231

=== Archives ===
- Archiv für Zeitgeschichte, ETH Zürich, Zürich: Dokumentationsarchiv wf, 1943–1993.
