= Notz Metal =

Notz Metal, Inc.
- Native name: Notz Metall AG
- Company type: Private
- Industry: Steel manufacturing
- Founded: 1898; 128 years ago in Biel/Bienne, Switzerland
- Founder: Albert Notz
- Key people: Alexander Catsiapis (Chairman and CEO)
- Owner: Notz family
- Parent: Notz Holding Ltd.
- Subsidiaries: Laminieres Matthey, Studer-Biennaform, Jacques Allemann, VOCO
- Website: www.notzmetall.ch

The Notz Metal (officially Notz Metal, Inc.) is a Swiss integrated steel and wire manufacturing company based in Biel/Bienne (BE), Switzerland. Founded in 1898, the company is still privately held and managed by the third generation of the Notz family.

Notz Group includes subsidiaries, Laminieres Matthey in La Neuveville, Studer-Biennaform (stainless flat wire) in Brügg, Jacques Allemann SA (drawn bars, alloys) in Dannemarie, Haut-Rhin (France) and VOCO Sàrl.

== History ==
Notz was founded in 1898 by Albert Notz and initially specialised in steel manufacturing for the watch industry. Later the company expanded into various industries and after watchmakers there were clients in the machinery, tool and electronics, automotive and bicycle industry as well as maritime and railroads. In 1993, the company expanded into merchant activities after founding the trading company MAG Metall AG.

The group acquired several specialized companies over the years, such as Laminieres Matthey (2017), Studer-Biennaform (2003), Jacques Allemann SA (2002) and VOCO (2006).
