= Heinrich Homberger =

Swiss business federation director (1896–1985)

- Born: 5 November 1896; Zurich, Switzerland
- Died: 9 January 1985 (aged 88); Maur, Switzerland
- Education: University of Zurich
- Occupations: Businessman, diplomat
- Title: Director of the Swiss Federation of Commerce and Industry
- Spouse: Anna Maria Liechti (m. 1922)

Heinrich Homberger (5 November 1896 – 9 January 1985) was a Swiss businessman and diplomat who was the director of the Swiss Federation of Commerce and Industry (SHIV), known as the Vorort, from 1939 to 1965. He decisively shaped Switzerland's official economic and trade policy during and after the Second World War.

== Early years and education ==
Heinrich Homberger was the son of Heinrich, a wine merchant. In 1922 he married Anna Maria Liechti, a doctor of law and daughter of Paul, a pastor whose posts included the Neumünster church in Zurich.

From 1912 to 1915 he attended the cantonal commercial school in Zurich, and in 1919 he obtained a diploma as a teacher of commercial subjects. He studied law in Paris, among other places, and in 1922 he completed a doctoral dissertation in political science (Staatswissenschaften) at the University of Zurich.

== Career ==
From 1922 Homberger was a secretary of the SHIV, from 1934 its first secretary, and from 1939 to 1965 its director. From 1950 to 1965 he was the delegate of the Vorort and a member of the Swiss Chamber of Commerce (Schweizerische Handelskammer). He decisively shaped Switzerland's official economic and trade policy in the war and postwar years, among other things as a member of the permanent negotiating commission (Ständige Verhandlungskommission) appointed by the Federal Council, which during the Second World War negotiated with both warring sides on Switzerland's possibilities for imports and exports.

For a quarter of a century he was the dominant figure of the SHIV.

== Works ==
- Schweizerische Handelspolitik im Zweiten Weltkrieg, 1970 (French translation: La politique commerciale de la Suisse durant la Deuxième Guerre mondiale, 1972)

== Bibliography ==
- Neue Zürcher Zeitung, 28 and 30 December 1965; 5 November 1976; 21 May 1997
- C. Pasche, Heinrich Homberger (1896–1985), licentiate thesis, Lausanne, 2000
- M. Meier, S. Frech et al., Schweizerische Aussenwirtschaftspolitik 1930–1948. Strukturen – Verhandlungen – Funktionen, 2002 (Veröffentlichungen der Unabhängigen Expertenkommission Schweiz – Zweiter Weltkrieg, 10)

=== Archives ===
- Archiv für Zeitgeschichte, ETH Zürich: personal papers (Nachlass) and working files (Handakten) from the Vorort
