= Scienceindustries =

Business association in Switzerland

- Established: 1882 (143 years ago)
- Legal status: swiss association
- Country: Switzerland
- Website: www.scienceindustries.ch

scienceindustries is a business association of more than 250 chemical, pharmaceutical, biotech other science-based companies in Switzerland. It is a major member of economiesuisse, the umbrella organization of the Swiss economy.
