= La Suisse Assurances =

Swiss life insurance company

- Company type: Insurance company
- Industry: Insurance
- Founded: 1858 in Lausanne, Switzerland
- Defunct: 2005
- Fate: Dismantled; divisions absorbed by Swiss Life, Vaudoise Assurances, and Helsana
- Headquarters: Lausanne, Switzerland
- Products: Life insurance, accident insurance, property insurance
- Number of employees: over 1,000 (2000)
- Parent: Rentenanstalt (Swiss Life) (from 1988)

La Suisse Assurances was a Swiss life insurance company based in Lausanne. Founded in 1858, it was the first life insurance company in French-speaking Switzerland and was dismantled in 2005.

== History ==
La Suisse Assurances was founded in Lausanne in 1858 by representatives of the upper bourgeoisie: Henri Richard, Samson Boiceau, François Guisan, William Rey, Eugène Doxat, and Emile-Samuel Bory. On the eve of the Second World War it gave up its activities in Europe but acquired several portfolios from foreign companies established in Switzerland. The accident division was created in 1940, and property insurance was introduced in 1978.

Having joined the Rentenanstalt group (Swiss Life from 2002) in 1988, La Suisse Assurances had more than 1,000 employees in 2000, divided between its head office in Lausanne and its 23 general agencies across Switzerland. The company was dismantled in 2005: the life insurance division was integrated into Swiss Life, the asset division was bought by Vaudoise Assurances, and the health and accident division by Helsana.

== Bibliography ==
- Perrochon, Henri; Delachaux, Armand et al., La Suisse 1858–1958. Société d'assurances sur la vie Lausanne, 1959
- Encyclopédie illustrée du Pays de Vaud, vol. 3, 1972, p. 176; vol. 9, 1981, p. 116
