= Swiss Life =

Life insurance company based in Zurich, Switzerland

Coordinates: 47°21′46″N 8°32′03″E

Swiss Life Holding AG

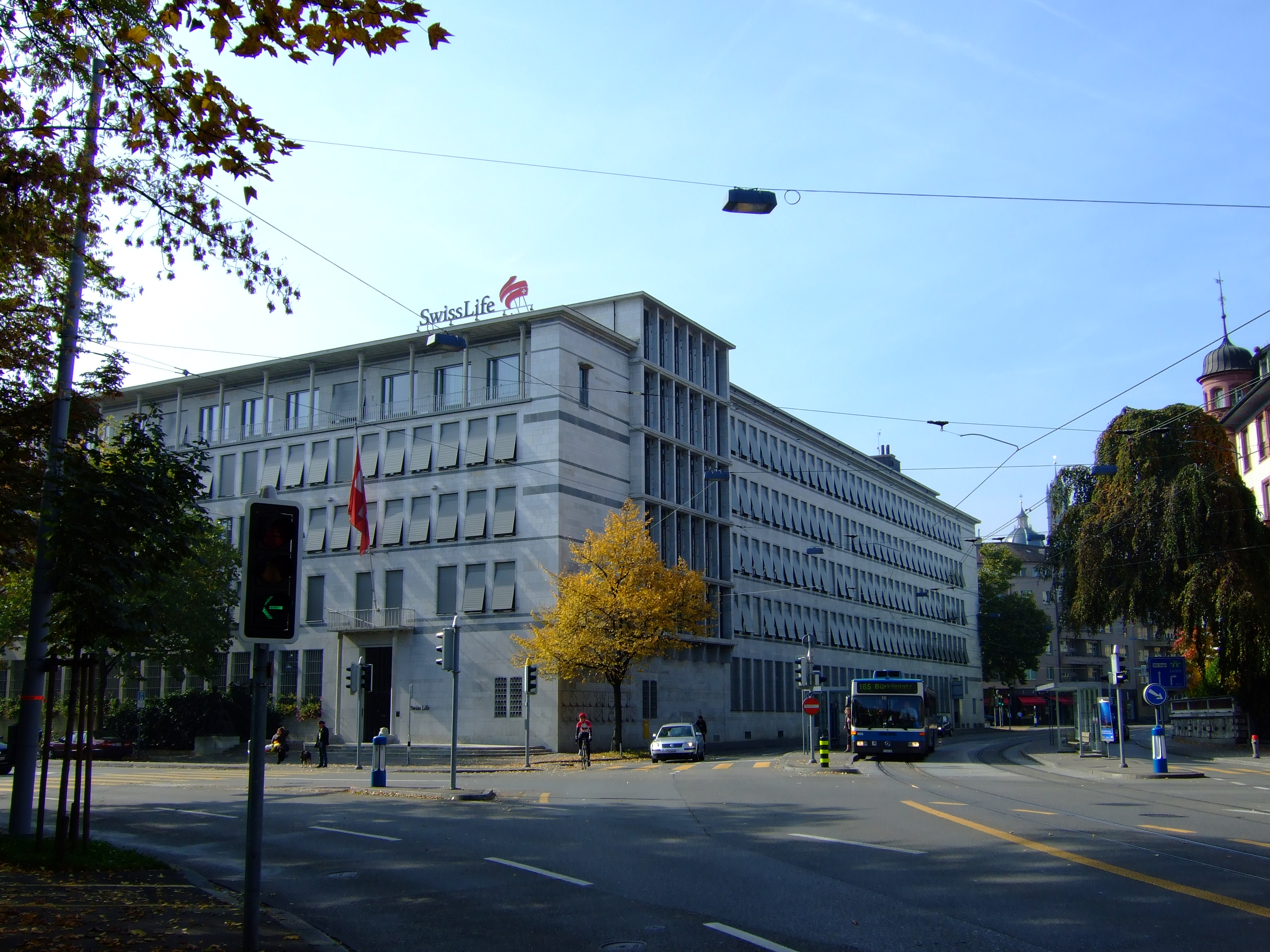
- Swiss Life AG headquarters in Zurich.
- Formerly: Rentenanstalt
- Type: Aktiengesellschaft
- Traded as: SIX: SLHN
- Industry: Financial services
- Founded: 21 November 1857 (168 years ago)
- Founder: Conrad Widmer
- Headquarters: Zurich, Switzerland
- Area served: Mostly Europe
- Key people: Matthias Aellig (CEO), Rolf Dörig (Chairman)
- Products: Life insurance, risk, pensions and other financial services, Asset management, Health insurance (France only)
- Revenue: CHF 20.9 bn (2025)
- Operating income: CHF 1.83 bn (2025)
- Net income: CHF 1.26 bn (2025)
- Total assets: 219.1 bn (2025)
- Total equity: CHF 7.7 bn (2025)
- Number of employees: 11,000 (FTE, 2025)
- Divisions: Swiss Life Switzerland; Swiss Life France; Swiss Life Germany; Swiss Life International; Swiss Life Asset Managers
- Subsidiaries: List: Swiss Life Select Switzerland; Swiss Life Select Germany; Swiss Life Select Austria; Swiss Life Select Czech Republic; Livit AG (Switzerland); Tecis (Germany); HORBACH (Germany); Proventus (Germany); Chase de Vere (UK); BEOS (Germany)
- Website: https://www.swisslife.com

The Swiss Life Group is the largest life insurance company of Switzerland and one of Europe’s leading comprehensive life and pensions and financial services providers, with approximately CHF 356.3 bn of assets under management. Founded in 1857 in Zurich as the Schweizerische Lebensversicherungs und Rentenanstalt cooperative, the company entered the Swiss stock market in 1997 and adopted its current name in 2002. In 2025, the group declared an adjusted profit from operations of CHF 1.83 billion. Net profit was CHF 1.26 billion. Swiss Life is one of the twenty companies listed under the Swiss Market Index, as SLHN.

== History ==
=== Foundation and growth ===
Conrad Widmer established the Schweizerische Rentenanstalt ("Swiss annuity institution") in 1857 as the first life insurance company in Switzerland, backed by guarantees from Schweizerische Kreditanstalt. Prominent Zurich politician Alfred Escher was closely involved in the development of the cooperative, whose goal was to provide Swiss families with insurance against the uncertainties of life: the company's board included representatives of most Swiss cantons. In 1866, Widmer obtained a license in Prussia, and a year later, the Rentenanstalt had business operations in Hamburg and Bremen. Beginning in 1894, it was one of the first insurance institutions to offer occupational insurance. Between 1866 and 1987, Rentenanstalt expanded to Germany, France, the Netherlands, Belgium, the United Kingdom, Spain, Luxembourg, and Italy. In 1988 it took over La Suisse Assurances of Lausanne.

The first registered office of Rentenanstalt was in the Tiefenhoefe buildings on the Paradeplatz in Zurich. Rapid expansion saw the offices moving in quick succession from the Gruene Schloss on Zwingliplatz, to the Chamhaus on the Untere Zäune and finally to the Alpenquai, where the new head office was opened in 1898. Although this building was spacious for its time, further expansion in the interwar period necessitated yet another move. During 1937–1939 a modern building designed by the Pfister firm of architects was constructed close to the old head office. It is this building, extended during 1961–1963 and later, that houses today's company head office in Zurich.

=== Going corporate ===
In 1997, under the management of Manfred Zobl, Rentenanstalt changed from a mutual into a publicly traded proprietary company, with Rentenstalt/Swiss Life shares debuting in the Swiss Market Index in 1998. Swiss Life then embarked on an expansionary strategy, acquiring Livit, Banca del Gottardo, the Lloyd Continental and UTO Albis in 1999, and Schweizerische Treuhandgesellschaft in 2000, and taking over the real estate properties of Oscar Weber Holding AG in 2001. In 2002, the rapid acquisitions ceased as the company looked to restructuring and going back to its core business.

=== Acquisitions and divestments ===
In 2002, the company changed its name to Swiss Life for all its operations except in the Netherlands, where it remained under the old name Zwitser Leven (Dutch for "Swiss Life"); the Netherlands company was sold in 2007 to SNS Reaal together with the Belgium business. In 2004, it sold its British operations to Resolution Life Group. In November 2007, Swiss Life sold off Banca del Gottardo for 1.775 billion CHF. On 3 December 2007, Swiss Life announced that it had launched a takeover bid for AWD Holding; on 13 March 2008, it succeeded in acquiring a total of 86.2% of AWD, which became Swiss Life Select in 2013. The acquisition of Corpus Sireo, a German real estate asset management service provider, was completed in the summer of 2014, and that of Mayfair Capital, a UK real estate investment management firm, in 2016. In 2021, Swiss Life Asset Managers acquired the real estate business of Ness, Risan & Partners, a provider of real estate projects and funds in the Nordic region.

=== Acquisition history ===
Swiss Life Acquisitions
- Schweizerische Lebensversicherungs und Rentenanstalt (Founded 1857 by Conrad Widmer)
  - Rentenstalt/Swiss Life shares (Acq 1998, Launch on Swiss stock market)
  - Livit (Acq 1999)
  - Banca del Gottardo (Acq 1999)
  - Lloyd Continental (Acq 1999)
  - UTO Albis (Acq 1999)
  - Schweizerische Treuhandgesellschaft (Acq 2000)
  - Oscar Weber Holding AG (Acq 2001)
  - AWD Holding (Acq 2008)
    - Swiss Life Select
  - Corpus Sireo (Acq 2014)
  - Mayfair Capital (Acq 2016)
  - Ness, Risan & Partners (Acq 1999)
  - elipsLife (Acq 2021)
  - Versdiagnose (Acq 2022)
  - Franke und Bornberg (Acq 2022)
  - Zwei Wealth(Acq 2025)

== Corporate structure ==
The Swiss Life Group reports by country. Besides the three core markets Switzerland, France and Germany, the Group separately discloses its cross-border segments International and Asset Managers.

=== Switzerland ===
Swiss Life Switzerland is a comprehensive provider of life and pensions and financial solutions. With its brands Swiss Life, Swiss Life Select and Swiss Life Wealth Managers and over 1.4 million private and over 50 000 corporate clients, Swiss Life Switzerland is one of Switzerland's leading providers.

=== France ===
Swiss Life France specialises in personal insurance but also provides, through its Swiss Life Banque Privée subsidiary, asset management and insurance services combined with private banking for high net worth individuals.

=== Germany ===
The German branch of Swiss Life, founded in 1866, is based in Munich and offers private and corporate clients services in pensions saving and financial security. Core competencies are occupational disability insurance and occupational pensions. Swiss Life's financial distribution subsidiaries (Swiss Life Select, HORBACH, Tecis and Proventus) are headquartered in Hanover.

=== International ===
With locations in Switzerland, Luxembourg, Liechtenstein, the Netherlands, Italy, Hongkong and Singapore, Swiss Life International offers Private placement life insurance (a form of investment with an insurance wrapper) for high-net-worth individuals in Europe and Asia, and provides employee benefits for large corporate clients. The financial advisors from Swiss Life Select Austria, Czech Republic and Slovakia, and Chase de Vere in the UK also operate under the Swiss Life International umbrella.

=== Asset Managers ===
Swiss Life Asset Managers offers institutional and private investors access to investment and asset management services. In Switzerland, it is one of the largest institutional asset managers and the third largest fund provider in the country. In Germany, Swiss Life Asset Managers significantly strengthened its position in the market with the acquisition of the real estate asset management service provider Corpus Sireo in 2014. The real estate management company Livit AG is also a subsidiary of the Swiss Life Asset Management entity, along with London-based Mayfair Capital Investment which was acquired in 2016. In 2018, Swiss Life Asset Managers acquired the German real estate company BEOS AG and in 2019 Fontavis, an investment manager for clean energy and infrastructure funds. In 2024, Swiss Life Asset Managers acquired the Swedish company Wilfast Förvaltning AB to strengthen its position as an institutional real estate manager in Europe and strengthen its footprint in Scandinavia.

== Corporate governance ==
=== Board of directors ===
The board of directors is responsible for the general direction of the Group and the supervision of the Corporate Executive Board. The Board is elected for one-year terms and is composed as follows:

Board composition
Position	Name	Year appointed
Chairman	Rolf Dörig	2002
Vice-chairman	Klaus Tschütscher	2013
Member	Adrienne Corboud Fumagalli	2014
Member	Damir Filipovic	2011
Member	Stefan Loacker	2017
Member	Henry Peter	2006
Member	Martin Schmid	2018
Member	Franziska Tschudi Sauber	2003
Member	Thomas Buess	2019
Member	Monika Bütler	2022
Member	Severin Moser	2023

=== Corporate executive board ===
The group CEO directs the business operations of the group and works out the long-term objectives and strategic orientation of the group, together with the corporate executive board.

- Group CEO: Matthias Aellig
- Group CFO: Marco Gerussi
- Group CIO: Per Erikson
- CEO Switzerland: Roman Stein
- CEO France: Tanguy Polet
- CEO Germany: Dirk von der Crone
- CEO International: Theodoros Iaponas

== Financials ==
According to Swiss law, shareholders are obliged to disclose information regarding their shareholdings in Swiss-based companies when these amount to or exceed 3%. Shareholders currently holding registered shares (purchasing positions included) of Swiss Life Holding Ltd., are BlackRock Inc. (over 5%), and UBS Fund Management (Switzerland) AG (over 3%).

== CSR and sponsorship ==
The “Perspectives Foundation” of Swiss Life, established in 2005, promotes charitable initiatives in the Swiss home market in the areas of health, science, education, culture and sport, donating between CHF 1.3 and 1.5 million every year to social and charitable projects.

Swiss Life also jointly founded the Swiss Climate Foundation with eleven other companies in 2008. All partners donate their net gains from redistributed CO_{2} levies to the foundation, which in turns supports projects helping small and medium-sized enterprises to reach voluntary target agreement with the Energy Agency of the Swiss Private Sector (EnAW), develop operational energy savings and climate protection systems.

In March 2016, the Swiss Life Group presented its first Corporate Responsibility Report in accordance with the guidelines of the Global Reporting Initiative (GRI), as an integral part of the Annual Report 2015. The Corporate Responsibility Report focuses on business activities, society, employees and the environment and is guided by the principle of materiality. The report is published annually.

From 2004 to 2020, Swiss Life sponsored the Swiss national football team.

In the field of culture, Swiss Life supports, among others, the Zurich Film Festival (ZFF), the Lucerne Festival, the Zurich Opera House, the Tonhalle Orchestra Zurich and the Davos Festival.

Since the 2015/16 season, Swiss Life has been supporting the ice hockey club ZSC Lions as general sponsor. Swiss Life Arena, the hockey and sports arena for 12,000 fans of the ZCS Lions club in Altstetten, is also named after Swiss Life. The opening took place in October 2022.

== See also ==
- Swiss Insurance Association
- Swiss Life Select
