= Economiesuisse =

Swiss corporate union

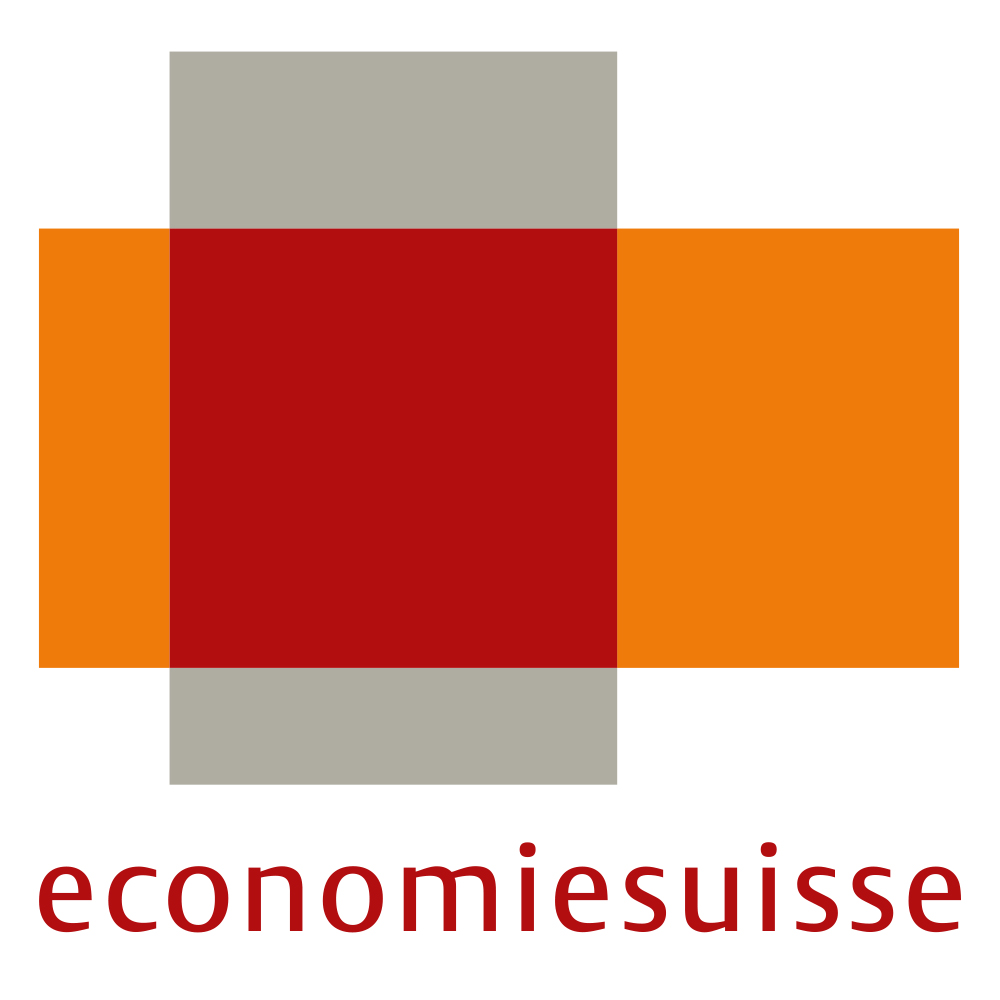
Logo

Economiesuisse is a Swiss corporate union, composed of the fusion of the Union suisse du commerce et de l'industrie ("Swiss union of commerce and industry") or Vorort, and of the Société pour le développement de l'économie suisse ("society for development of Swiss economy").

It is one of the three umbrella organizations of the Swiss economy, alongside Swiss Employer's Association and the Swiss Union of Arts and Crafts.

== History ==
The USCI was founded in 1870, following a string of workers' strikes and demonstrations. In 1882, it was renamed Vorort. It aimed at favouring the interests of business owners.

From 1870 to 1882, the USCI lacked a permanent committee, and each member canton would preside in rotation. From 1882, the USCI was re-organised around a nine-member direction organ, the Vorort, seating in Zurich.

From 1931, the chambre Suisse du commerce, another organ of the USCI, was tasked with choosing the committee.

After its fusion with the Société pour le développement de l'économie suisse, the USCI has been renamed Economiesuisse. According to its website, It represents some 100,000 companies, who employ 2 million workers. Its stated goals are promoting optimum work conditions for Swiss business, and promote enterprise freedom. It also makes statements on taxes, research, energy and environment, public health and infrastructure.
