= Conrad Zellweger =

Conrad Zellweger or Konrad Zellweger may refer to:

- Conrad Zellweger (died 1705) (1630–1705), Swiss merchant and politician, co-founder of the Zellweger trading house
- Conrad Zellweger (died 1749) (1659–1749), Swiss merchant and politician, son of the above
- Conrad Zellweger (died 1741) (1664–1741), Landammann of Appenzell Ausserrhoden, mentioned in Landhandel
- Conrad Zellweger-Sulser (1694–1771), Swiss merchant, brother of Johannes Zellweger (1695)

== See also ==
- Zellweger family
