= Anna Barbara Zellweger =

Swiss political adviser (1775–1815)

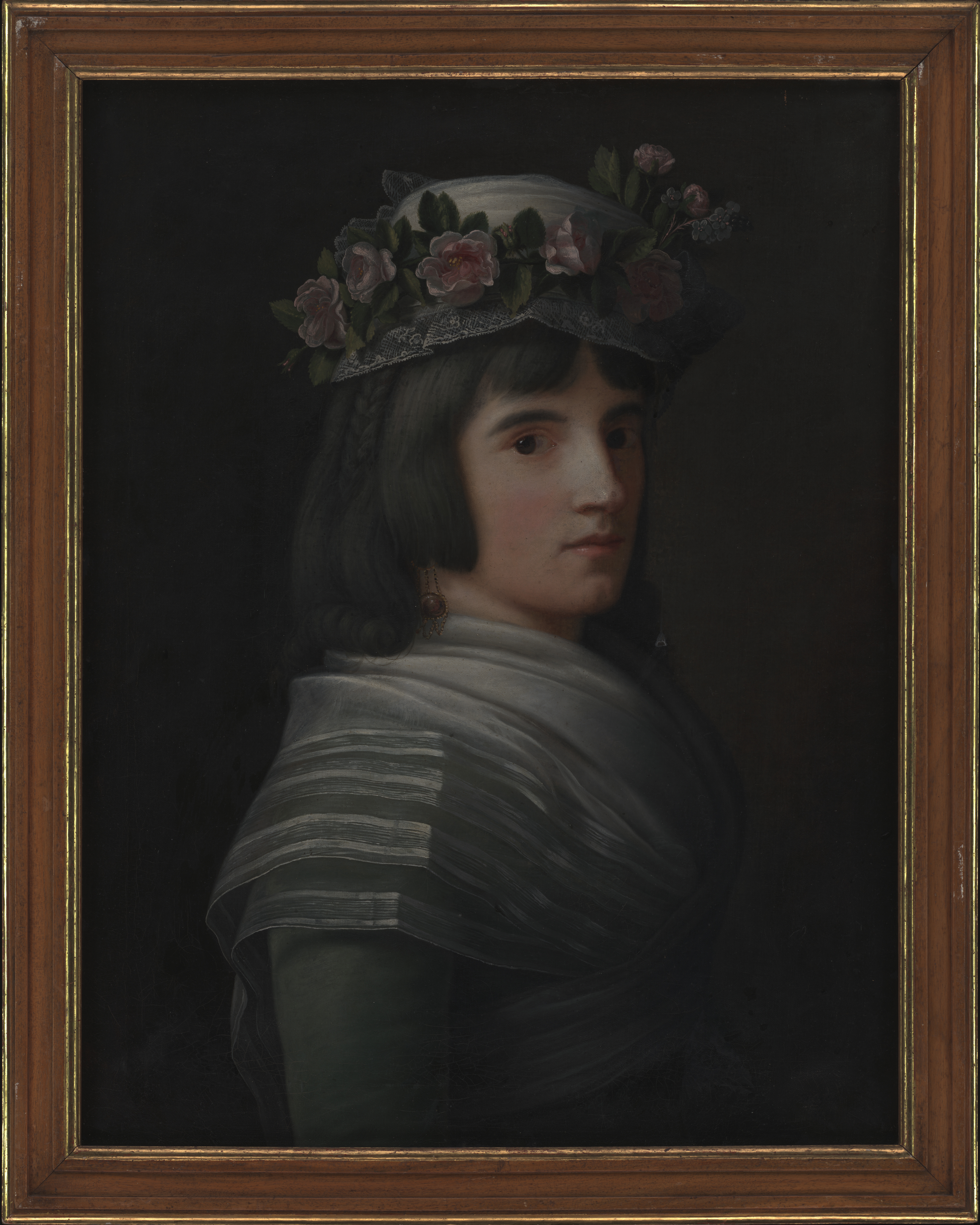
- Born: Anna Barbara Zuberbühler; 27 May 1775; Speicher
- Died: 27 November 1815 (aged 40); Trogen
- Spouse: Jacob Zellweger (m. 1793)
- Children: 17
- Relatives: Johann Jakob Zuberbühler (grandfather); Johann Ulrich Zuberbühler (brother)

Anna Barbara Zellweger (née Zuberbühler; 27 May 1775 – 27 November 1815) was a Swiss political adviser and the wife of landammann Jacob Zellweger of Trogen. She is known for her political correspondence and her role as a personal counsellor to her husband on political matters during the turbulent period of the late 18th and early 19th centuries.

== Early life ==
Anna Barbara Zuberbühler was born on 27 May 1775 in Speicher as the second child of Johann Georg Zuberbühler, a physician and councillor, and Katharina Barbara Tobler. She was the granddaughter of Johann Jakob Zuberbühler, a physician and landammann, and the elder sister of Johann Ulrich Zuberbühler, a merchant and councillor in Speicher. Little is known about her childhood and youth, except that she became an orphan at the age of 10 when her father died.

== Marriage and family ==
After her sister Catharina Barbara Zuberbühler married Michael Tobler, a thread merchant and arsenal superintendent, in 1791, Anna Barbara married Jacob Zellweger in 1793. Her husband had been managing, since 1792, an international textile trading company in Trogen and Genoa together with his father Johannes Zellweger and two of his brothers, including the future philanthropist Johann Caspar Zellweger. From 1802 to 1818, Jacob Zellweger served as landammann of Appenzell Ausserrhoden and as a delegate to the Diet. From the first decade of the 19th century, Anna Barbara Zellweger and her sister Catharina Barbara Tobler lived in Trogen with their families.

Over the course of their 22-year marriage, Anna Barbara gave birth to 17 children: 11 daughters and six sons. Eight of them survived to adulthood, including Jacob, Ulrich, and Salomon Zellweger. She died in childbirth at the age of 40 on 27 November 1815.

== Political correspondence and influence ==
Anna Barbara Zellweger's biography is better documented after her marriage thanks to the letters she exchanged with her husband from 1795 until her death. One hundred and twenty original letters and approximately 80 transcriptions of lost letters have been preserved. These constitute a valuable testimony to the marriage and life of a woman belonging to the elite during the turbulent period of the late 18th and early 19th centuries. In her correspondence, Anna Barbara Zellweger distinguished herself not only through her elegant writing style, but also as a cultivated interlocutor, her husband's personal adviser, and a woman with her own political opinions. In 1804, she provided acerbic commentary on the coronation of Napoleon in Paris, which she had attended with her husband and other members of the Swiss delegation.

== Residential and social life ==
Between 1802 and 1805, the couple had a representative residence built by Konrad Langenegger on the Landsgemeinde square in Trogen, serving as both a dwelling and a commercial building. The construction was supervised by Anna Barbara Zellweger. During the winter of 1802–1803, at the beginning of the construction work, Jacob Zellweger was imprisoned in the Aarburg fortress together with other federalists, including Alois von Reding. Anna Barbara Zellweger was highly appreciated for her qualities as a hostess and her sense of conviviality. In addition to her representational duties, she supervised household and agricultural work while raising her children.
