= Zellweger =

The name Zellweger is a noble lineage of the Appenzell area, Switzerland, and may refer to:

People with the surname Zellweger:

- Alfred Zellweger (1855–1916), Swiss electrical engineer and entrepreneur
- Bartholome Zellweger (1625–1681), Swiss politician and merchant
- Conrad Zellweger (1630–1705), Swiss merchant and politician
- Conrad Zellweger (1659–1749), Swiss merchant and politician
- Hans Zellweger (1909–1990), Swiss-American pediatrician and namesake of Zellweger syndrome
- Josef Zellweger (born 1963), Swiss gymnast
- Marc Zellweger (born 1973), Swiss football defender
- Olen Zellweger (born 2003), Canadian ice hockey player
- Renée Zellweger (born 1969), American actress
- Shea Zellweger (1925–2022), American educator

Furthermore, the name Zellweger may refer to:

- Zellweger family, a family of Appenzell Ausserrhoden
- Zellweger off-peak, the brand-name of an electric switching device
- Zellweger syndrome, a rare congenital disorder
- Zellweger spectrum disorders, a group of rare disorders
