= Johannes Tobler =

Swiss-American politician, astronomer, and almanac publisher (1696–1765)

- Born: September 3, 1696; Rehetobel, Appenzell Ausserrhoden, Swiss Confederacy
- Died: March 15, 1765 (aged 68); New Windsor, Province of South Carolina
- Other names: John Tobler
- Occupations: Politician, astronomer, almanac publisher, merchant, farmer, judge
- Known for: Founding the Appenzeller Kalender, first periodical in Appenzell Ausserrhoden
- Spouse: Anna Zellweger (m. 1718)
- Children: 10 (one died in infancy)

Johannes Tobler (3 September 1696 – 15 March 1765) was a Swiss-American politician, amateur astronomer, and almanac publisher. He was the founder of the Appenzeller Kalender, the first periodical published in Appenzell Ausserrhoden, and later became a prominent figure in colonial South Carolina where he continued his publishing career and served as a justice of the peace.

== Early life and career ==
Johannes Tobler was born on 3 September 1696 in Rehetobel, Appenzell Ausserrhoden, to Ulrich Tobler, a prosperous weaver and farmer, and Elsbeth Schläpfer. He grew up in the hamlet of Cholenrüti near Rehetobel, where he attended primary school. As a young adult, he took over the family farm and married Anna Zellweger of Gais in 1718. Anna was the daughter of Bartholome Zellweger and Anna Sturzenegger, belonging to an influential branch of the prominent textile merchant family from Trogen. The couple had ten children, though one died in infancy.

== Publishing and astronomical work ==
In 1721, Tobler published the first issue of the Appenzeller Kalender, initially titled Schreib-Calender, following the popular tradition of astronomical and astrological almanacs. This publication marked the first periodical to appear in Appenzell Ausserrhoden. As an autodidact, Tobler was particularly motivated by his ability to calculate the dates of solar and lunar eclipses through mathematical computations, information that was often missing or incorrect in contemporary almanacs. He also contributed textual content to the publication, including descriptions of natural phenomena for popular education purposes, reflecting the ideals of the Age of Enlightenment.

== Political career ==
Tobler held several significant political positions in his native Appenzell. He served as a member of the Council from 1723 to 1728, then as president of Rehetobel from 1728 to 1730. Subsequently, he held cantonal positions as an ensign (1730–1731) and captain (Landeshauptmann) of Appenzell Ausserrhoden (1731–1733). As a representative of the moderate faction (Doux) during the troubles of the Landhandel, he was forced to resign from government in 1733. Although re-elected as president of Rehetobel, the cantonal magistrates prevented him from taking office, imposed a fine, and confiscated part of his property.

== Emigration to America ==
Influenced by Sebastian Zuberbühler, a member of the group of colonists who had accompanied Jean Pierre Pury to South Carolina and a Swiss recruiter in service of the British colonial administration, Tobler emigrated to North America with about a hundred other residents of Appenzell Ausserrhoden. In 1736/1737, he settled with his family in the newly founded community of New Windsor, located on lands previously inhabited by indigenous peoples. After initial difficulties, he managed to establish a new existence as a merchant and farmer, owning a boat and a forge.

== Life in South Carolina ==
Around 1749, Tobler was appointed justice of the peace for Granville County by the British governor, a position he held until his death. Like other Swiss colonists in South Carolina, Tobler owned enslaved people, though sources provide no information about their number or living conditions. The family experienced a crisis following the death of one of his sons during the Anglo-Cherokee War (1758–1761), which was part of the global conflict of the Seven Years' War.

== Publishing career in America ==
Tobler continued his work as a publisher in English after his emigration. In 1752, he published the first issue of the South-Carolina Almanack, which he edited with Christopher Sower, a German immigrant residing in Philadelphia. Simultaneously, he continued to contribute to the Appenzeller Kalender and other Swiss almanacs, sending his contributions by postal mail. From 1754, he published a second almanac under his own name, The Pennsylvania Town and Country-Man's Almanack, which appeared for many years. Through their circulation, Tobler's calendar calculations were reproduced in numerous American almanacs, often anonymously and sometimes long after his death. While one of his sons continued to operate the forge, the calendar-making tradition was not perpetuated within the family.

== Death ==
Johannes Tobler died on 15 March 1765 in New Windsor, South Carolina, at the age of 68.

== Publications ==
- Appenzeller Kalender (editor), 1722–1737
- The South-Carolina Almanack (editor), 1752–1792 (with gaps, only the calendar portion written by Tobler, published partly posthumously)
- The Pennsylvania Town and Country-Man's Almanack (editor), 1754–1777 (only the calendar portion written by Tobler, published partly posthumously)

== Bibliography ==
- Witschi, Peter: Appenzeller in aller Welt. Auswanderungsgeschichte und Lebensschicksale, 1994, pp. 138–151, 263-264.
- Strickland, Virginia Bowe: Five Fortune Tellers of New Windsor. Tobler, Zubly, Meyer, Sturzenegger and Nail, Swiss Pioneer Families of South Carolina, 2009.
- Böning, Holger: "Aufgeklärte Kalendermacher aus dem Bauernstand – der Appenzeller Kalender und seine Herausgeber", in: Herbst, Klaus-Dieter; Greiling, Werner (ed.): Schreibkalender und ihre Autoren in Mittel-, Ost- und Ostmitteleuropa (1540-1850), 2018, pp. 459–491.
- Aragai, David: "A Swiss calendar maker in colonial America: The life and work of Johannes Tobler (1696-1765) between Appenzell Ausserrhoden and South Carolina", in: Swiss American Historical Society Review, 59/3, 2023, pp. 50–82.
- Tobler, John: "The John Tobler manuscripts. An account of German-Swiss emigrants in South Carolina", ed. and translated by Charles Guy Chordle, in: The Journal of Southern History, 5/1, 1939, pp. 83–97.
- Tobler, John: "John Tobler's description of South Carolina", ed. and translated by Walter L. Robbins, in: The South Carolina Historical Magazine, 71/3, 1970, pp. 141–161; 71/4, 1970, pp. 257–265.
