= Gessner =

Gessner is a surname. Notable people with the surname include:

- Conrad Gessner (1516–1565), Swiss naturalist, bibliographer, botanist, physician and classical linguist
- David Gessner (born 1961), American essayist, memoirist, nature writer, editor, and cartoonist
- Georg Gessner (1765–1843), Swiss theologian
- Heinrich Gessner (1768–1813), Swiss printer and publisher
- Johannes Gessner (1709–1790), Swiss mathematician, physicist, botanist, mineralogist and physician
- Konrad Gessner (1764–1826), Swiss painter
- Nicolas Gessner (born 1931), Hungarian-born film director
- Salomon Gessner (1730–1788), poet and painter

== See also ==
- Gesner
