= Elisabeth Pletscher =

Swiss laborantine and women's rights activist

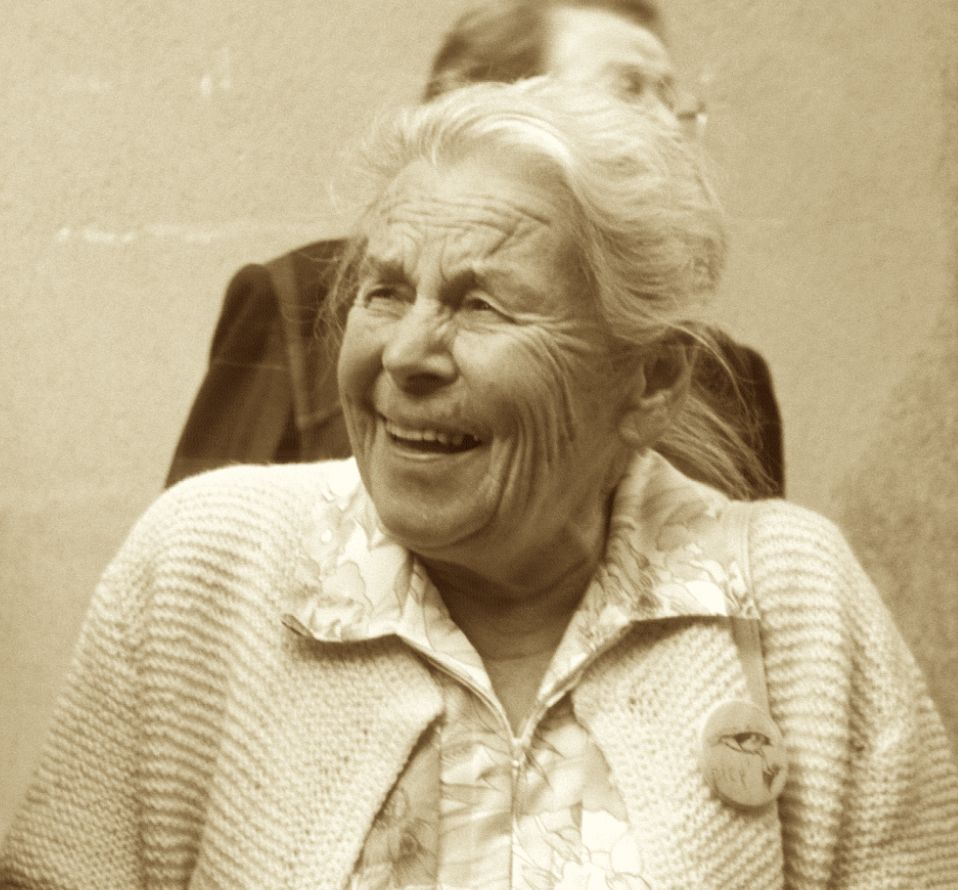
- Born: 12 October 1908; Trogen, Appenzell Ausserrhoden, Switzerland
- Died: 11 August 2003 (aged 94); Trogen, Appenzell Ausserrhoden, Switzerland
- Occupation: Medical laboratory technician
- Known for: Co-founder of the Swiss Professional Association of Medical Laboratory Technicians, women's suffrage advocacy

Elisabeth Pletscher (12 October 1908 – 11 August 2003) was a Swiss medical laboratory technician and women's rights activist from Trogen, Appenzell Ausserrhoden. She was the co-founder and president of the Swiss Professional Association of Medical Laboratory Technicians and played a significant role in the international organization of laboratory technicians. Pletscher was also a prominent advocate for women's suffrage in Switzerland, particularly in Appenzell Ausserrhoden.

== Early life and education ==
Elisabeth Pletscher was born on 12 October 1908 in Trogen to Theodor Pletscher, a teacher at the cantonal school, and Martha Susanne Kern. She was a great-great-granddaughter of Jacob Zellweger (1770–1821) and came from Schleitheim. She obtained her Matura at the cantonal school in Trogen and attended a laboratory technician school in Bern.

== Career ==
Pletscher worked as chief laboratory technician at the maternity ward of the Zurich cantonal hospital from 1930 to 1973. During the Second World War, she served as a laboratory technician in the Women's Auxiliary Service (Frauenhilfsdienst).

In 1929, Pletscher co-founded the Swiss Professional Association of Medical Laboratory Technicians, which she later led as president from 1956 to 1966. In 1954, she organized the first international congress of laboratory technicians in Zurich, which led to the creation of an international association that she directed from 1954 to 1973. In 1958, she collaborated with the Swiss Exhibition for Women's Work (Saffa).

== Women's suffrage advocacy ==
Beginning in 1959, Pletscher participated in political debates, advocating for women's suffrage in Appenzell Ausserrhoden. She argued for the right to vote with characteristic Appenzell humor until it was finally adopted by the Landsgemeinde in 1989. Her efforts made her a prominent figure in the canton's women's rights movement.

== Recognition ==
For her contributions, Pletscher received the Appenzell Ausserrhoden Foundation for Culture Prize in 1997 and an honorary doctorate from the University of St. Gallen in 1998.

== Death ==
Elisabeth Pletscher died on 11 August 2003 in her hometown of Trogen at the age of 94.
