= Johannes Zellweger =

Johannes Zellweger may refer to:

- Johannes Zellweger (1695) (1695–1774), Swiss merchant from Trogen and Landammann of Appenzell Ausserrhoden
- Johannes Zellweger (1730) (1730–1802), Swiss merchant from Trogen, son of the above
