= Rechsteiner =

Rechsteiner is a surname. Notable people with the surname include:

- Johannes Rechsteiner (1618–1665), Swiss politician, Landammann of Appenzell Ausserrhoden
- Kurt Rechsteiner (1931–2017), Swiss cyclist
- Martin Rechsteiner (born 1989), Liechtensteiner footballer
- The Steiner Brothers
  - Robert Rechsteiner (born 1961), American real estate broker and professional wrestler
  - Scott Carl Rechsteiner (born 1962), American professional wrestler
- Bronson Rechsteiner (born 1997), American professional wrestler, son of Robert Rechsteiner
- Brock Rechsteiner (born 2002), American football player, son of Scott Rechsteiner
- Cheyenne Rechsteiner (born 1994), swiss wheel gymnastics gymnast
