= Jakob Zellweger =

Swiss merchant & politician (1723–1808)

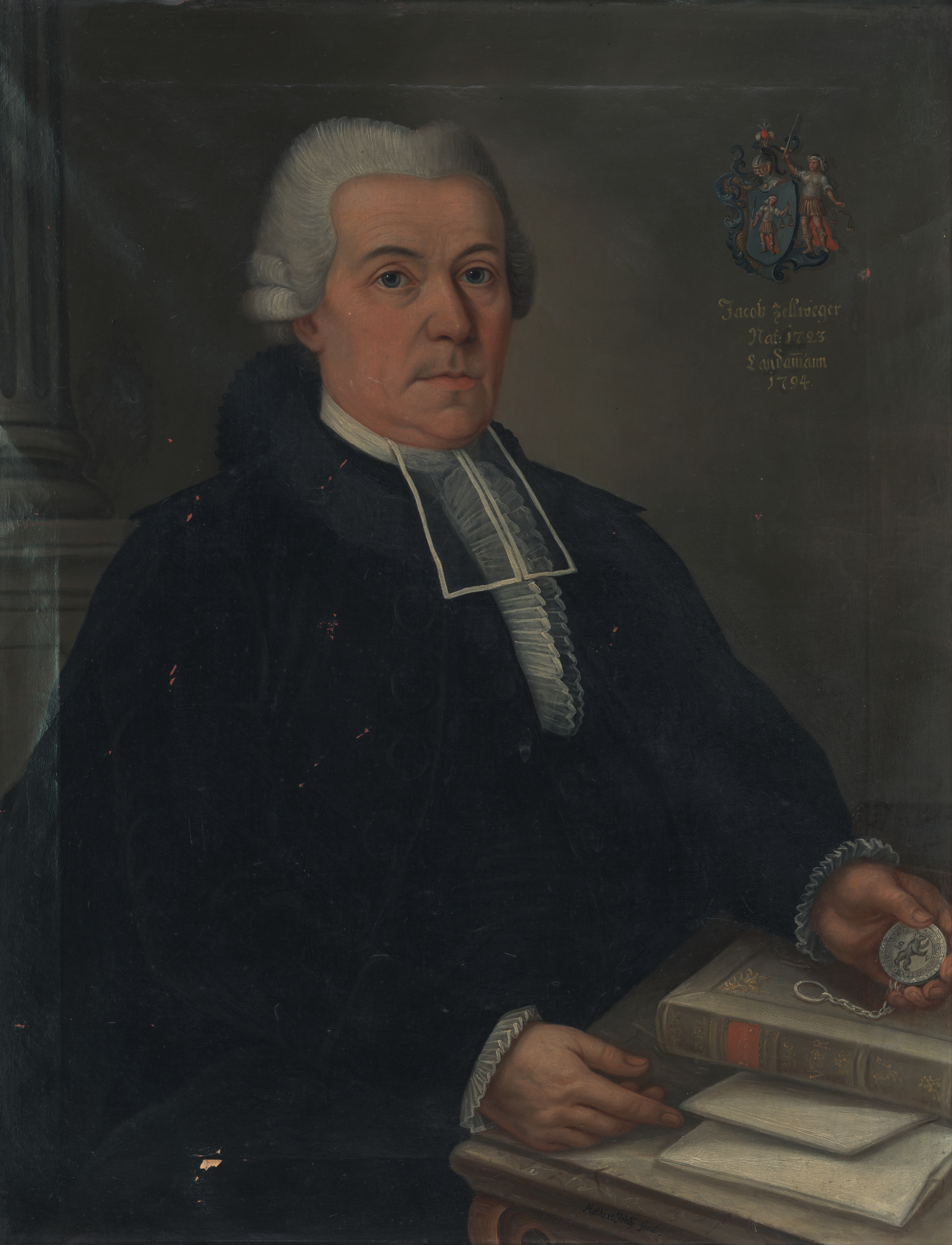
- Baptised: 22 December 1723; Lyon, France
- Died: 16 December 1808; Trogen, Appenzell Ausserrhoden, Switzerland
- Occupations: Merchant, politician
- Spouse: Anna Maria Wetter (m. 1754)
- Parent: Johannes Zellweger (1695)
- Relatives: Johannes Zellweger (brother)

Jakob Zellweger (baptized 22 December 1723 – 16 December 1808) was a Swiss merchant and politician from Trogen, Appenzell Ausserrhoden. He was a prominent figure in European commercial capitalism and played a significant role in the textile trade during the height of the Appenzell textile business.

== Early life and family ==
Zellweger was baptized on 22 December 1723 in Lyon, France. He was the son of Johannes Zellweger and brother of Johannes Zellweger. He was Protestant and belonged to the prominent Zellweger family of Trogen. In 1754, he married Anna Maria Wetter, daughter of Johann Laurenz Wetter, a merchant.

== Business career ==
Zellweger directed the Lyon branch of his father's company until 1762, after which he took over the parent company in Trogen. In 1774, he separated from his brother and business partner Johannes to found the firm Zellweger älter & Comp., which established branches in Lyon and Genoa. Along with his brother, he experienced the peak of the Appenzell textile trade and became a notable figure in European commercial capitalism.

== Political career ==
Zellweger held numerous political offices in Appenzell Ausserrhoden throughout his career. He served as a councillor in Trogen beginning in 1762, and was appointed captain of Appenzell Ausserrhoden from 1780 to 1781. He subsequently served as treasurer from 1781 to 1782, vice-Landammann from 1783 to 1793, and Landammann and delegate to the Federal Diet from 1794 to 1797. Following his exile to Vorarlberg in 1798, he returned to serve as Landammann of the interim government in 1799.

== Civic contributions ==
Between 1760 and 1763, Zellweger had a house built for himself decorated with superb stuccowork, which later became the rectory of Trogen. In 1764, he founded an asylum for the poor and orphans. He financed the furnishings of the new Trogen Church, which was built between 1779 and 1782.
