= Heinrich Freudweiler =

Swiss painter (1755-1795)

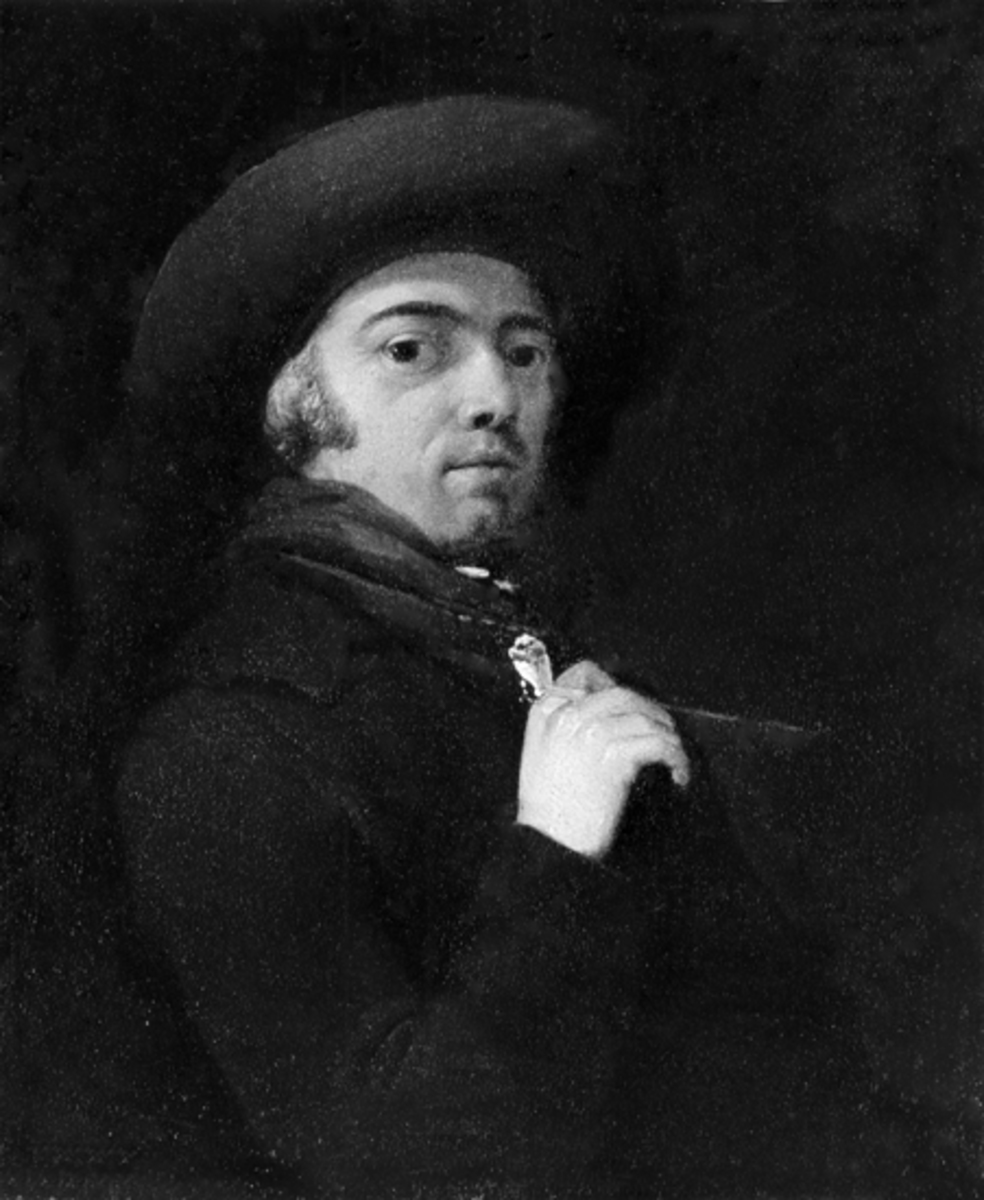
- Self-portrait
- Born: 16 October 1755; Zurich, Switzerland
- Died: 4 December 1795 (aged 40); Zurich, Switzerland
- Known for: Painting

Heinrich Freudweiler (16 October 1755 – 4 December 1795) was a Swiss painter. After training in Zurich and studying in Germany, he returned to Zurich in 1785 and worked mainly in portraiture and genre painting. From about 1786, he became known for allegorical memorial images of women who had died in childbirth, works that helped establish Trostbilder as a visual genre.

== Biography ==
Freudweiler was born in Zurich on 16 October 1755. He trained with the landscape painter Heinrich Wüest, who gave him access to Zurich art collections. He continued his training at the Kleiner Kunstsaal, a semi-private art school in Zurich, where he was among the first students.

In 1777 and 1778, Freudweiler spent time in Düsseldorf and Mannheim, where he studied seventeenth-century Dutch and Flemish painting. In 1784, he travelled with Johann Konrad Gessner to Dresden, where he was taught by Anton Graff and Adrian Zingg, and then went to Berlin, where he became friends with Daniel Nikolaus Chodowiecki.

From 1785, Freudweiler lived in Zurich, where he worked as a painter. In 1790, he married Anna Elisabeth Wirz. With his friend Heinrich Füssli, he helped run a drawing school for young craftsmen, where he taught without payment. He died in Zurich on 4 December 1795.

== Work ==
Freudweiler worked in painting, drawing and etching. He painted history and landscape subjects and was especially active as a portrait painter. His genre scenes were shaped by Dutch painting and the work of William Hogarth and Daniel Nikolaus Chodowiecki. Often small in format, his paintings, watercolours and etchings depicted Zurich’s social milieu. Freudweiler also produced drawings, gouaches and title vignettes, some of them humorous in character.

From about 1786, Freudweiler became known in educated urban circles for allegorical memorial images of women who had died in childbirth. His 1786 engraving La sollicitude d'une mère dans l'Eternité, after a portrait of the deceased wife of a friend, circulated widely. These works developed the visual treatment of grief into a new genre known as Trostbilder.

His works are held in collections including the Zähringer Museum in Baden-Baden, the Staatliche Kunsthalle Karlsruhe, the Graphische Sammlung of ETH Zurich and Kunsthaus Zürich.

== Gallery ==
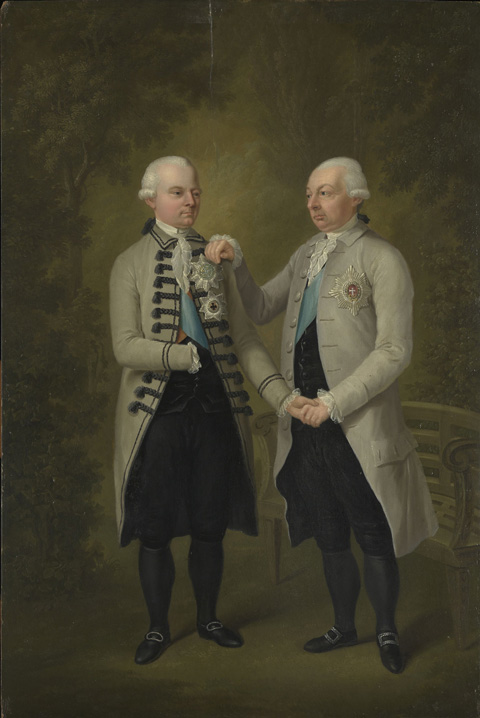
Margrave Charles Frederick of Baden and Hereditary Prince Charles Louis Mourning the Death of Caroline Louise, 1783

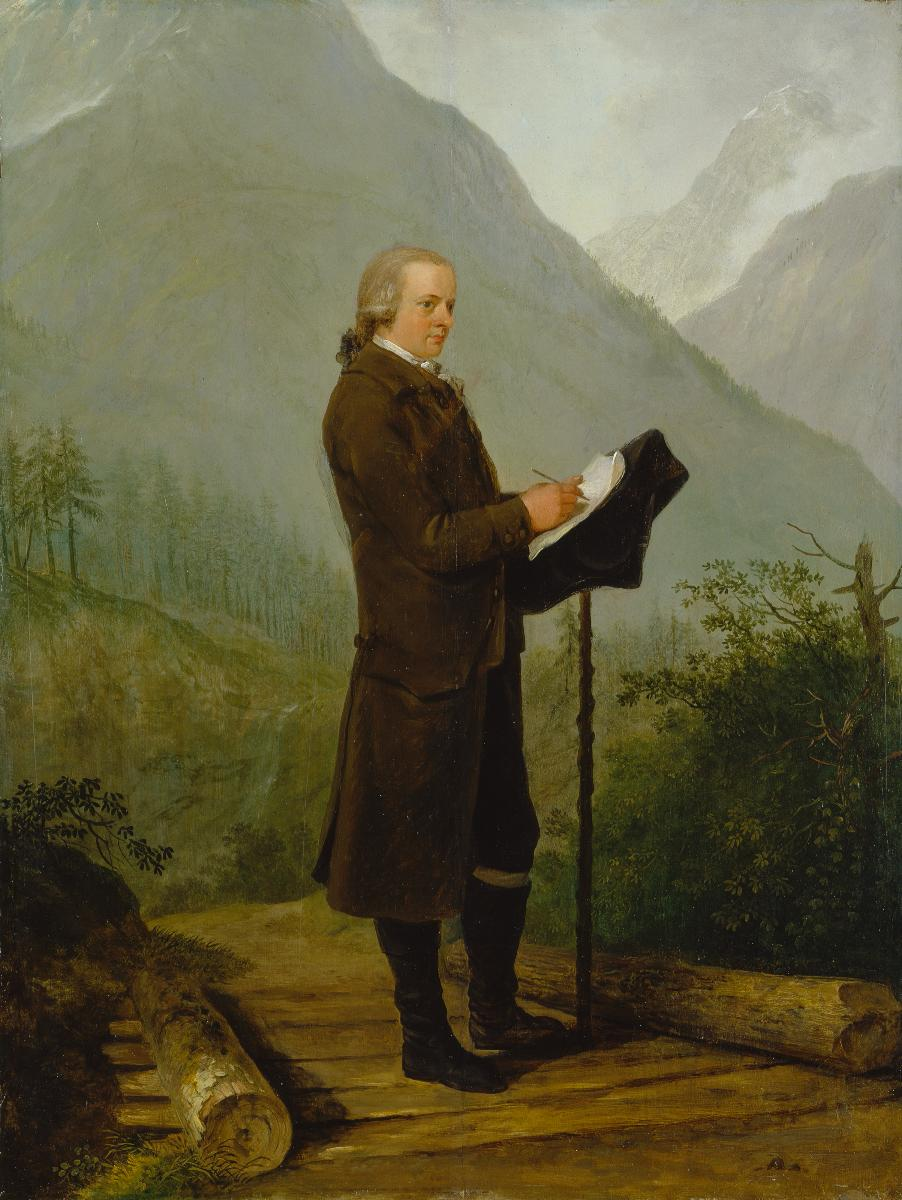
Portrait of painter Ludwig Hess, 1790

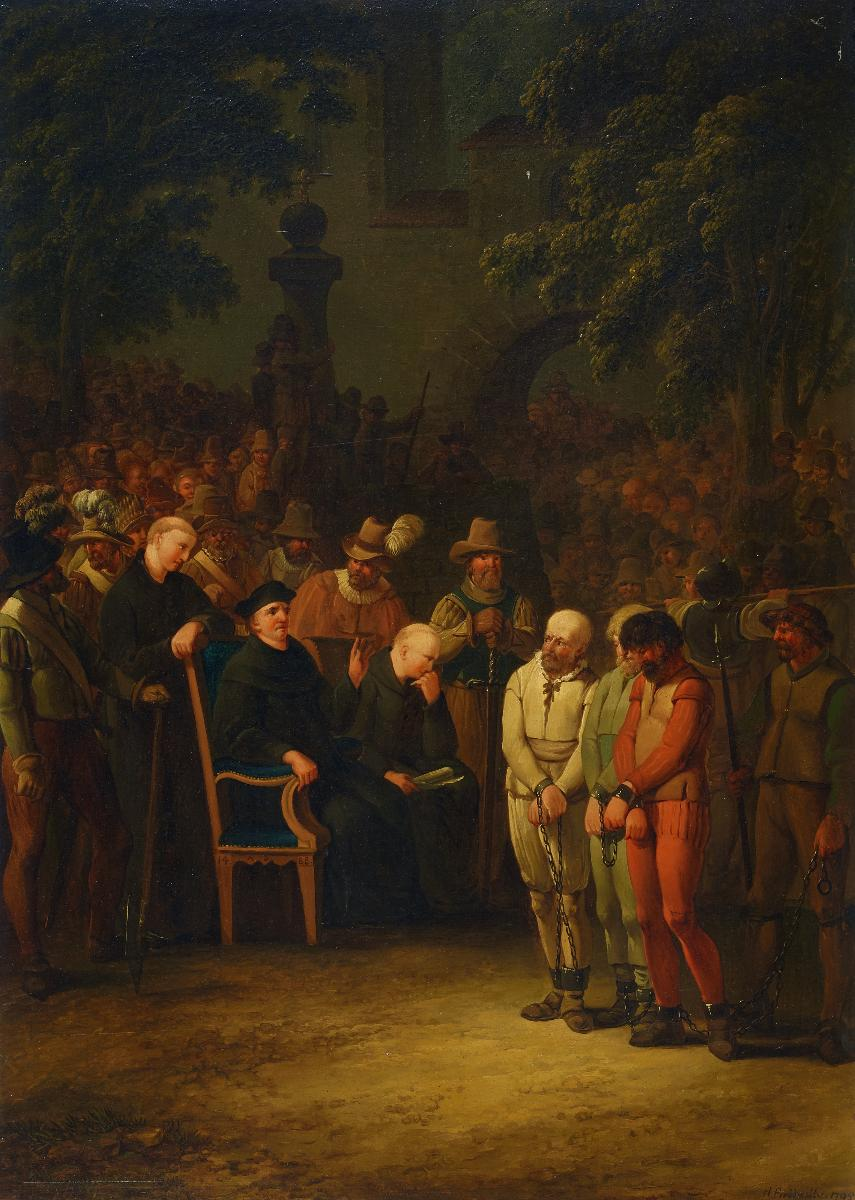
The Abbot of Engelberg Pardons the Ringleaders, 1795
