= Laurenz Zellweger =

Swiss physician and scholar (1692–1764)

- Baptised: 2 August 1692; Trogen, Appenzell Ausserrhoden
- Died: 6 May 1764; Trogen, Appenzell Ausserrhoden
- Occupations: Physician, archivist, politician
- Known for: Member of the Zurich Enlightenment circle, co-founder of the Helvetic Society

Laurenz Zellweger (baptized 2 August 1692 – 6 May 1764) was a Swiss physician, archivist, and politician from Trogen in Appenzell Ausserrhoden. He was a prominent member of the Zurich Enlightenment circle and co-founder of the Helvetic Society.

== Early life and education ==
Laurenz Zellweger was baptized on 2 August 1692 in Trogen, the son of Conrad Zellweger. He was the brother of Johannes Zellweger and remained unmarried throughout his life. He completed an apprenticeship with the physician Johann Jakob Scheuchzer in Zurich, followed by medical studies under Herman Boerhaave in Leiden from 1710 to 1713.

== Medical career ==
In 1713, Zellweger opened a medical practice in Trogen, where he established himself as a prominent physician in the region.

== Political and administrative career ==
Beyond his medical practice, Zellweger held numerous administrative and political positions in Appenzell Ausserrhoden. He reorganized the cantonal archives of Appenzell Ausserrhoden from 1723 to 1729. His political career included serving as councillor, municipal secretary of Trogen, and chancellor from 1726 to 1729. He was appointed examiner in 1728 and served as superintendent of the arsenal of Appenzell Ausserrhoden from 1729 to 1732. From 1732 to 1734, he was a member of the Grand Council and cantonal archivist.

=== Landhandel and political exile ===
During the Landhandel, Zellweger sided with the Doux faction. As a consequence, he was banned from the Council in 1734 and excluded for life from all political functions. He documented these experiences in two unpublished works.

== Intellectual activities ==
From 1723, Zellweger and Johann Jakob Bodmer formed the core of the Zurich Enlightenment circle. The group met several times in Trogen for debates, and Zellweger maintained correspondence with its members. He was a member of the Society of Painters in Zurich and the Zurich Society of Natural Sciences. He was also a co-founder of the Helvetic Society.
