= Zellweger family =

Family of Appenzell Ausserrhoden

- Parent family: Geppensteiner
- Country: Switzerland
- Origin: Gais and Appenzell
- Founded: 15th century
- Members: Bartholome Zellweger; Conrad Zellweger; Conrad Zellweger (died 1749); Laurenz Zellweger; Johannes Zellweger (1695); Jakob Zellweger; Johannes Zellweger (1730); Jacob Zellweger; Johann Caspar Zellweger; Jakob Zellweger-Hünerwadel; Salomon Zellweger; Ulrich Zellweger; Alfred Zellweger
- Connected families: Tanner; Sulser of Azmoos
- Estate: Palaces in Trogen (built 1747–1810)

The Zellweger family is a family of Appenzell Ausserrhoden that shaped the economy and politics of Ausserrhoden from the early modern period until the middle of the 19th century. Until 1848 it provided eight Landammanns. Its trade in linen, and later in raw cotton and cotton fabrics, with branches in Lyon, Genoa and Barcelona, brought it a prosperity unparalleled in the Appenzell region, which was also the main cause of the rise of Trogen.

== History ==
The Zellweger family emerged from the Geppensteiner family in the 15th century and lived in Gais and Appenzell. As adherents of the new faith of the Reformation, the Zellwegers moved to the Outer Rhodes (Äussere Rhoden) in the 1580s. From the early modern period until the middle of the 19th century the family shaped the economy and politics of Ausserrhoden. Until 1848 it provided eight Landammanns and numerous other cantonal officials. Between 1597 and 1797 the Zellwegers were represented in the government of Ausserrhoden for 193 years, 74 of them as Landammann.

The economic rise of this family of innkeepers began with the brothers Bartholome and Conrad, who took part in the opening of a linen inspection office (Leinwandschau) in Trogen in 1667. Within five generations the Zellwegers attained a prosperity unparalleled in the Appenzell region, which was also the main cause of Trogen's rise. The trade in linen, and later in raw cotton and cotton fabrics, was the basis of their successful textile firms, which had branches in Lyon, Genoa and Barcelona. Through a deliberate marriage policy the Zellwegers allied themselves with most of the influential families of Ausserrhoden and so strengthened their position of power. Sons-in-law were brought into the firms, which in some cases gave rise to new companies.

The dominance of the two related families Zellweger and Tanner led their opponents to join forces, which brought about the political fall of the Zellwegers in the Landhandel of 1732–1734. For years afterwards the family was regarded as unfit to govern. In 1754 the marriage of Jakob sealed the reconciliation with the family's main rivals, the Wetter family. Through the brothers Conrad (1694–1771), Johannes and Laurenz, the family had close ties to the Sulser merchant family in Azmoos and to scholarly circles in Zurich.

The family's business reached its peak in the second half of the 18th century with the two firms of the brothers Jakob and Johannes. The latter's sons, Jacob and Johann Caspar, eventually gave up the business; Johann Caspar was also active in textile production, where he emerged as a pioneer of industrialization. Some of their descendants worked in other fields, some of them outside Trogen, and several gained considerable standing: Jacob's sons Jacob, a physician and Landammann, Salomon, an entrepreneur, and Ulrich, the founder of a bank in Paris, as well as Alfred, who founded a company in Uster.

The pre-eminence of the family is documented by the palaces built in Trogen from 1747 to 1810 by the Zellwegers and their relatives. Their extensive commitment to education and transport had a lasting effect.

== Bibliography ==
- E. H. Koller and J. Signer, Appenzellisches Wappen- und Geschlechterbuch, 1926, 396–408
- Schweizerisches Geschlechterbuch, 5, 1933, 752–767
- Appenzeller Geschichte, 2, 2nd edition, 1976 (with family tree)
- P. Holderegger, Unternehmer im Appenzellerland, 1992
- "Bande der Hochachtung und Liebe", exhibition catalogue, Trogen, 2000
- H. Fässler, Reise in Schwarz-Weiss, 2005, 41–49
- U. Pfister, "Der Textilhandel der Familie Zellweger in der zweiten Hälfte des 18. Jahrhunderts", in Europa in der Schweiz, 2013, 25–40
- H. Eisenhut, "Wunderlich kommt mir die Baute vor". Der Fünfeckpalast in Trogen und die Familie Zellweger, 2019

=== Archives ===
- Cantonal Library of Appenzell Ausserrhoden (Kantonsbibliothek Appenzell Ausserrhoden), Trogen: partial personal papers (Teilnachlass)
- State Archives of Appenzell Ausserrhoden (Staatsarchiv Appenzell Ausserrhoden), Herisau: Zellweger commercial archive (Kommerzialarchiv Zellweger)
