= Michael Schläpfer =

Swiss officer and plantation owner (1704–1760)

- Born: 29 April 1704; Speicher
- Died: 30 June 1760 (aged 56); Namur
- Occupations: Military officer, plantation owner

Michael Schläpfer (29 April 1704 – 30 June 1760) was a Swiss officer in Dutch service and the owner of plantations in the Dutch colony of Berbice, in present-day Guyana.

== Life ==
Schläpfer was the son of Johannes Schläpfer, a captain, and Elsbeth Walt, and grew up in Speicher with three sisters and two brothers. He remained unmarried and had no children. In the 1720s he entered Dutch service as an officer in a contingent from Appenzell Outer Rhodes; the unit to which he was first assigned is unknown. From 1748 he served, first as ensign and then as lieutenant-captain, in the company newly created by Captain Gabriel Steiger of Herisau, part of the regiment known as that "of the small cantons."

Nothing else is known of his time in service. When Schläpfer died at the age of 56 at Namur, where he was on garrison duty, he bequeathed to his siblings plantations in Berbice, a self-administered Dutch colony on the north coast of South America. Many people from the Confederacy, among them other eastern Swiss including Paulus Züblin and members of the Zollikofer family, also owned land there and exploited enslaved people deported from Africa. It is not known how Schläpfer came into possession of these properties or whether he ever traveled to South America; the Steiger company was never stationed in Berbice, and it was not uncommon for Europeans to acquire plantations in Amsterdam purely as an investment, entrusting them to local administrators.

His heirs in Appenzell entered the trade in colonial goods and invested considerable sums in expanding their plantations, Overberg and Vlakdaal, on the Canje River. On these estates an unknown number of enslaved people were exploited to produce sugar and to cultivate tobacco, coffee, pepper, cotton, and lemons for export to Europe. While Michael Schläpfer probably never visited his land, one of his heirs, his nephew Konrad Schläpfer, left Speicher in 1769 for Berbice; after his return in 1771 he published in the Appenzeller Kalender an illustrated account of the colony in which he praised the wealth of the plantations and described the forced labor. After the English conquest of Berbice in 1781, the Schläpfer inheritance was sold at a great loss in Amsterdam.

== Bibliography ==
- Schläpfer, Konrad (1771). "Kurze und wahrhafftige Beschreibung, von Caribana". In Alter und Neuer Appenzeller Staats-, Kriegs- u. Friedens Calender, oder der hinkende Bott, auf die Alte Zeit gerichtet 1771, 50.
- Rechsteiner, Johann Bartholome (1810). Sammlung der Geschicht und Begebenheit der alten Rood und Gemeinde zum Speicher, p. 193 (manuscript, Kantonsbibliothek Ausserrhoden, Trogen, Ms. 401).
- Mock, Laurenz (1811). "Die Appenzeller in holländischen Kriegsdiensten". In Materialien zu einer vaterländischen Chronik des Kantons Appenzell, 3, pp. 11–27.
- Rüsch, Gabriel (1831). Der Appenzeller-Chronik von Gabriel Walser vierter Theil, in welchem alle Begebenheiten, so sich von 1772 bis 1798 zugetragen, unpartheiisch beschrieben sind, pp. 44–46.
- Witschi, Peter (1994). Appenzeller in aller Welt. Auswanderungsgeschichte und Lebensschicksale, pp. 50–67.
- Fässler, Hans (2007). Une Suisse esclavagiste. Voyage dans un pays au-dessus de tout soupçon (German 2005).
