= Johann Jakob Zuberbühler (1719) =

Swiss physician & politician (1719–1781)

- Born: 8 January 1719; Herisau, Appenzell Ausserrhoden
- Died: 27 June 1781 (aged 62); Herisau, Appenzell Ausserrhoden
- Occupations: Physician, politician
- Spouse: Anna Dorothea Zwingger (m. 1756)

Johann Jakob Zuberbühler (8 January 1719 – 27 June 1781) was a Swiss physician and politician from Herisau in Appenzell Ausserrhoden. He served in various political offices in his canton, culminating in his appointment as vice-Landammann from 1776 until his death in 1781.

== Early life and education ==
Zuberbühler was born on 8 January 1719 in Herisau, the son of Johann Jakob Zuberbühler. He was the cousin of Johann Jakob Zuberbühler, with whom he maintained a strong friendship dating from their time studying together, and of Johann Laurenz Zuberbühler.

He attended the gymnasium in St. Gallen from 1734 to 1739, then pursued medical studies at the University of Halle from 1739 to 1745. He earned his doctorate with a thesis on insomnia (De noctibus agrypnis). After completing his studies, he spent time in France and Leipzig before returning to Herisau in 1755 to take over his father's medical practice.

In 1756, he married Anna Dorothea Zwingger, daughter of Jakob Christoph Zwingger, a physician and councillor from Bischofszell.

== Political career ==
Zuberbühler combined his medical practice with a distinguished political career in Appenzell Ausserrhoden. He served as a communal councillor (Gemeinderat) of Herisau from 1756 to 1771, and was elected president of Herisau from 1771 to 1772.

He subsequently held several cantonal military and political offices. From 1772 to 1774, he served as Ensign (Landesfähnrich) of the Rhodes-Extérieures (Appenzell Ausserrhoden). He was promoted to Landeshauptmann (captain of the country) from 1774 to 1776, and finally served as vice-Landammann of Appenzell Ausserrhoden from 1776 until his death in 1781.
