= Johann Jakob Zuberbühler (1723) =

Swiss physician & politician (1723–1803)

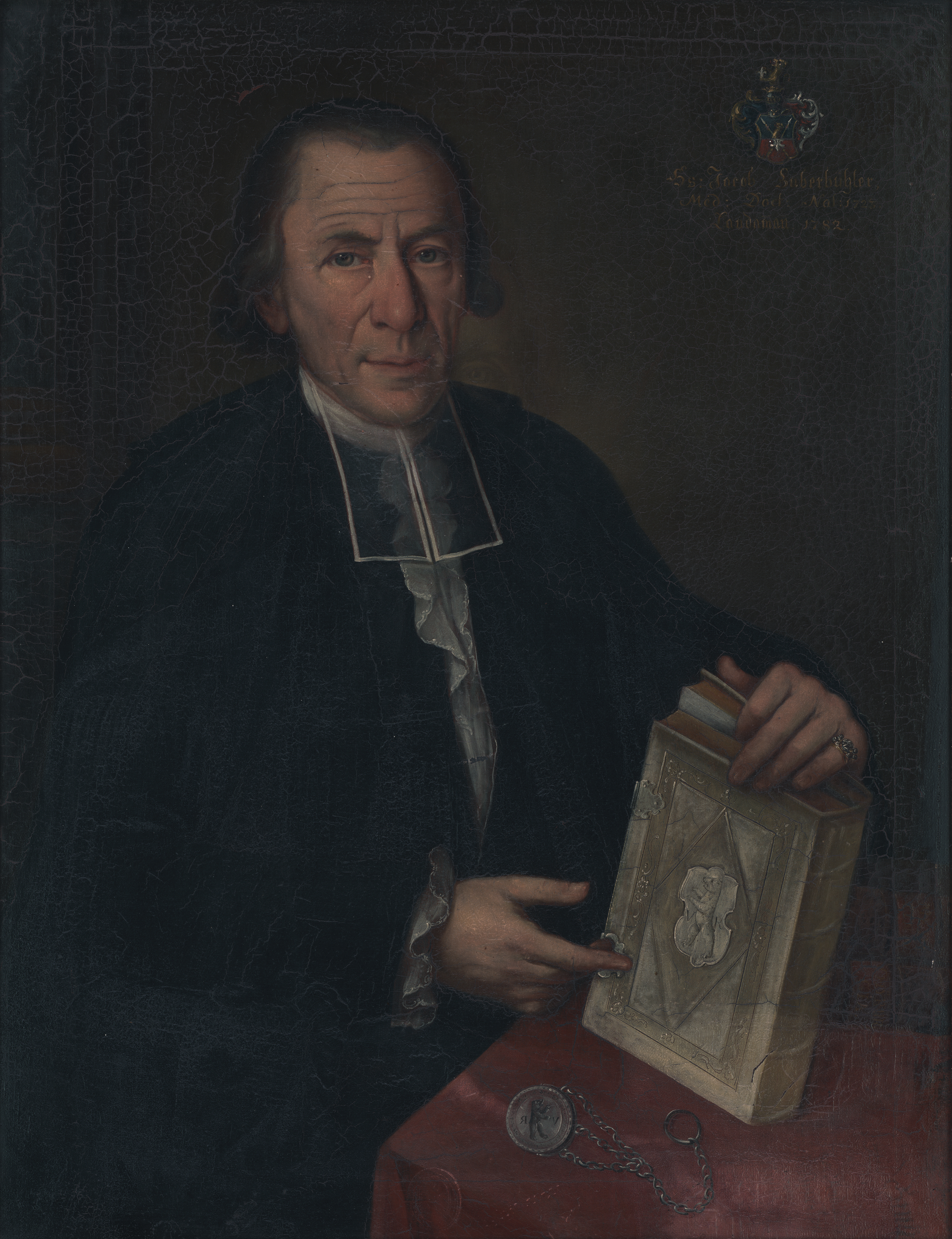

Landammann of Appenzell Ausserrhoden
- In office 1782–1794

Vice-Landammann of Appenzell Ausserrhoden
- In office 1781–1782

Treasurer of Appenzell Ausserrhoden
- In office 1780–1781

Captain of the Country (Landeshauptmann)
- In office 1762–1780

Personal details
- Born: 3 June 1723 Speicher, Appenzell Ausserrhoden
- Died: 28 May 1803 (aged 79) Speicher, Switzerland
- Spouse: Elsbeth Schläpfer (m. 1745)
- Parent(s): Johannes Zuberbühler; Catharina Schläpfer
- Relatives: Johann Laurenz Zuberbühler (brother); Johann Jakob Zuberbühler (cousin)
- Education: University of Halle
- Profession: Physician

Johann Jakob Zuberbühler (3 June 1723 – 28 May 1803) was a Swiss physician and politician from Speicher in Appenzell Ausserrhoden. He served as Landammann of the canton from 1782 to 1794 and was known for his conservative political views.

== Early life and education ==
Johann Jakob Zuberbühler was born on 3 June 1723 in Speicher to Johannes Zuberbühler, a physician, and Catharina Schläpfer. He was the brother of Johann Laurenz Zuberbühler. After attending the gymnasium in St. Gallen from 1734 to 1739, Zuberbühler studied medicine at the University of Halle, where he received his doctorate in 1743. He studied alongside his cousin, also named Johann Jakob Zuberbühler, with whom he remained closely connected throughout his life.

== Career ==
=== Medical practice and local politics ===
Zuberbühler worked as a physician and councillor in Speicher from 1747 to 1762. In 1745, he married Elsbeth Schläpfer, daughter of Hans Georg Schläpfer, president of Trogen. At the communal level, Zuberbühler contributed to improved financial management and increased public wealth.

=== Cantonal leadership ===
Zuberbühler served as Captain of the Country (Landeshauptmann) from 1762 to 1780. During the famine of 1770, he succeeded in obtaining a grain delivery from Southern Germany. Between 1771 and 1793, he served as a delegate to the Federal Diet nineteen times. He subsequently held the positions of Treasurer (1780–1781), Vice-Landammann (1781–1782), and Landammann of Appenzell Ausserrhoden (1782–1794). As an examining magistrate, he was known for his severity. In 1777, he participated in Solothurn in the renewal of the alliance with France.

=== Political views ===
A conservative politician, Zuberbühler complained about the lack of censorship of the Appenzeller Kalender in 1769. In 1785, he spoke out against lightning rods, arguing that if people ceased to fear thunder and lightning, their respect for divine warnings would diminish and soon nothing would be able to restrain them.

== Later life ==
In 1798, fearing the French advance, Zuberbühler temporarily took refuge in Vorarlberg. He maintained an active correspondence with various personalities of his time. In 1747, he had a four-story mansion built in Speicher. He died on 28 May 1803 in Speicher.
