= Johann Laurenz Zuberbühler =

Swiss textile merchant (1733–1790)

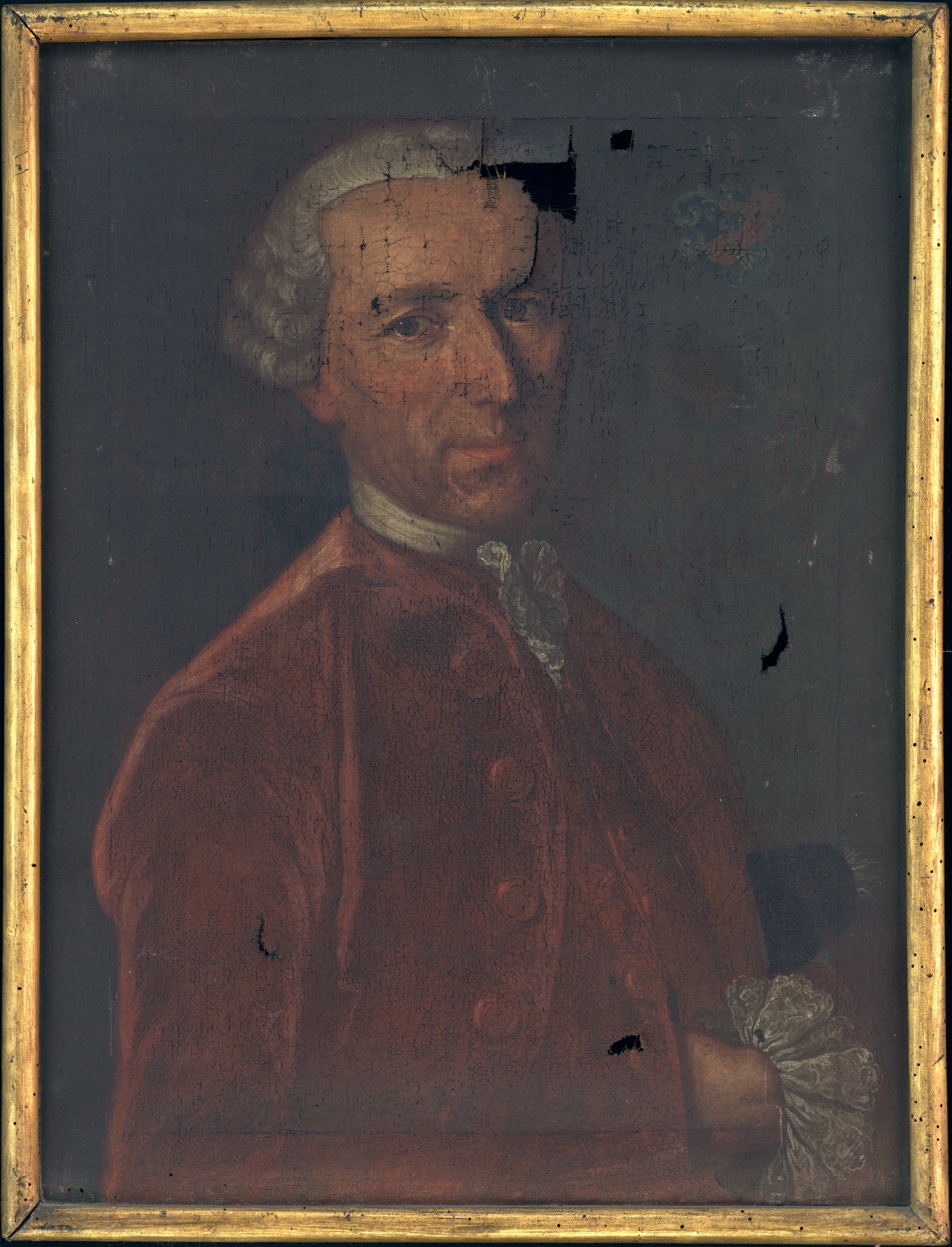
- Born: 14 January 1733; Speicher, Appenzell Ausserrhoden
- Died: 14 May 1790 (aged 57); Trogen, Appenzell Ausserrhoden
- Occupation: Textile merchant
- Spouse: Anna Zellweger (m. 1755)
- Parent(s): Johannes Zuberbühler (father); Catharina Schläpfer (mother)
- Relatives: Johann Jakob Zuberbühler (brother); Johann Jakob Zuberbühler (cousin)

Johann Laurenz Zuberbühler (14 January 1733 – 14 May 1790) was a Swiss textile merchant and public official from Appenzell Ausserrhoden. He developed an important textile export business with France and Italy, and served in various military and administrative positions in Trogen.

== Early life and family ==
Zuberbühler was born on 14 January 1733 in Speicher into a Protestant family. He was the son of Johannes Zuberbühler, a physician, and Catharina Schläpfer. His brother was Johann Jakob Zuberbühler, and he was also cousin to another Johann Jakob Zuberbühler. He became a citizen of Speicher and in 1754 of Trogen.

In 1755, Zuberbühler married Anna Zellweger, daughter of Conrad Zellweger (1694–1771), a textile merchant.

== Business career ==
Zuberbühler worked as a merchant in Lyon and Italy. His father-in-law's insistence on admitting him into the Zellweger brothers' textile sales house led to a dispute between the brothers in 1755 and the division of the company. This was followed by the founding of the firm C. Zellweger & Zuberbühler & Comp. Zuberbühler developed sales in France and Italy. After his father-in-law retired in 1766, he remained sole head of the company, which was renamed Zuberbühler & Comp., a textile export firm.

== Public service ==
Zuberbühler held several public offices in Trogen. He served as councillor from 1761, examiner from 1764, and district captain from 1766. From 1780 to 1786, he was major of Appenzell Ausserrhoden and superintendent of the arsenal.

In 1782, Zuberbühler and his wife donated valuable silver vessels to the new church in Trogen.

== Death ==
Zuberbühler died on 14 May 1790 in Trogen.
