= Johannes Rechsteiner =

Swiss politician (1618–1665)

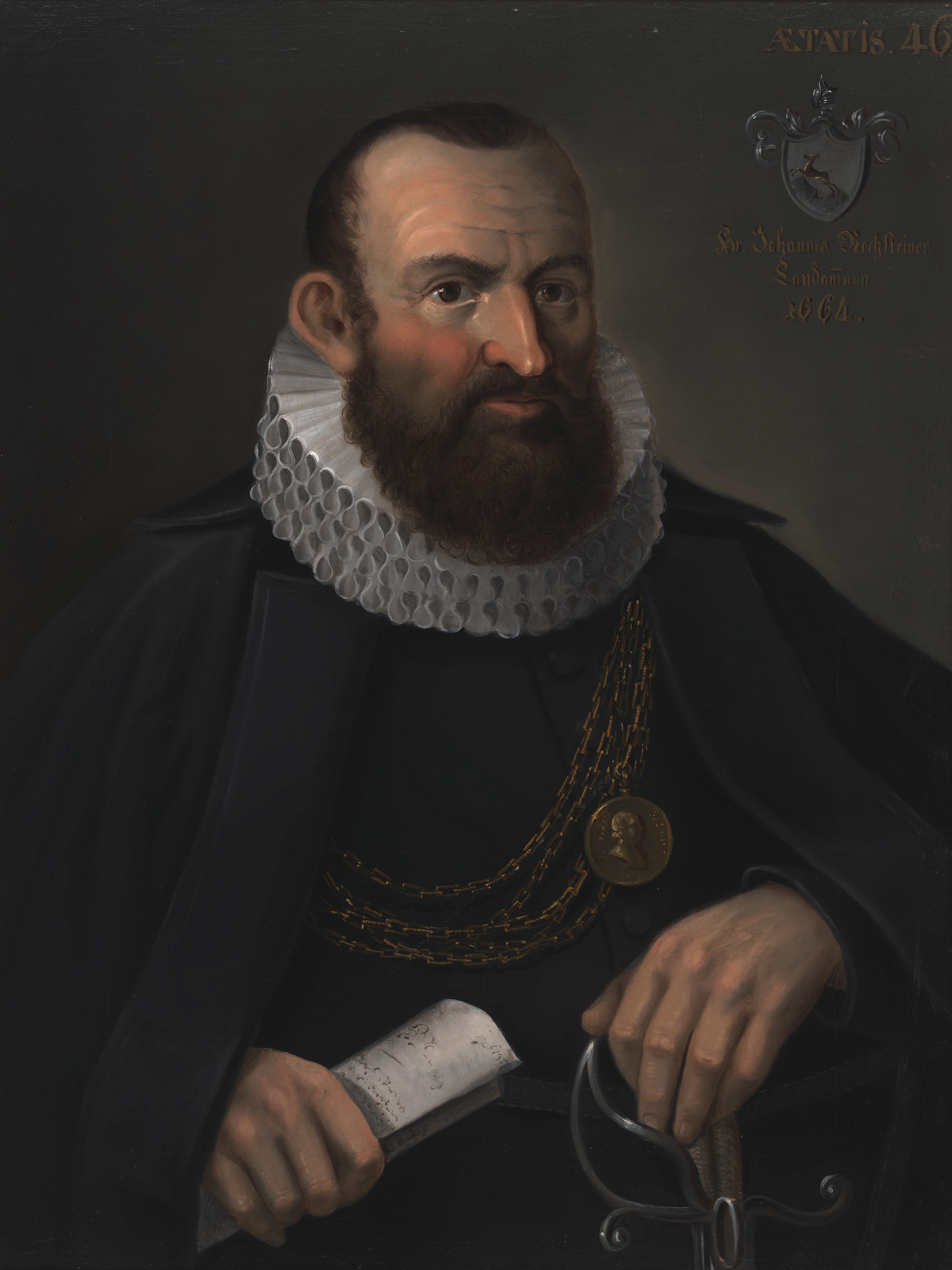
- Portrait (copy, around 1800)
- Baptised: 14 September 1618; Gais, Appenzell Ausserrhoden, Old Swiss Confederacy
- Died: 1 June 1665; Gais, Appenzell Ausserrhoden, Old Swiss Confederacy
- Occupation: Politician
- Spouse: Ursula Höhener
- Parents: Conrad Rechsteiner (father); Elisabeth Hager (mother)
- Relatives: Conrad Zellweger (son-in-law)

Johannes Rechsteiner (baptized 14 September 1618 – 1 June 1665) was a Swiss politician from Gais in Appenzell Ausserrhoden. From 1654 to 1665 he was Landammann of Appenzell Ausserrhoden and an envoy to the Federal Diet (Tagsatzung). From 1656 to 1658 he represented the Protestants on the panel of arbitrators that was to settle the First War of Villmergen.

== Biography ==
Johannes Rechsteiner was baptized on 14 September 1618 in Gais, the son of Conrad Rechsteiner and Elisabeth Hager. He married Ursula Höhener, daughter of Hans Höhener, municipal captain (Gemeindehauptmann). His daughter Anna married Conrad Zellweger.

Rechsteiner was municipal captain (Gemeindehauptmann) of Gais. From 1654 to 1665 he was Landammann of Appenzell Ausserrhoden and an envoy to the Federal Diet. In 1654 he presided over the commission for the revision of the cantonal law book (Landbuch).

During his time in government, Rechsteiner was heavily taken up by several conflicts: within the canton, the division of the municipality of Kurzenberg and the first efforts of Rehetobel to separate from Trogen; at the federal level, the First War of Villmergen. From 1656 to 1658 he represented the Protestants (Evangelische) on the panel of arbitrators set up to settle this conflict, and in 1663 he was an envoy at the renewal of the alliance (Bundeserneuerung) in Paris. He died in Gais on 1 June 1665.

== Bibliography ==
- E. H. Koller and J. Signer, Appenzellisches Wappen- und Geschlechterbuch, 1926, 250 f.
- Appenzeller Geschichte, 2
