= Johann Heinrich Wüest =

Swiss painter (1741–1821)

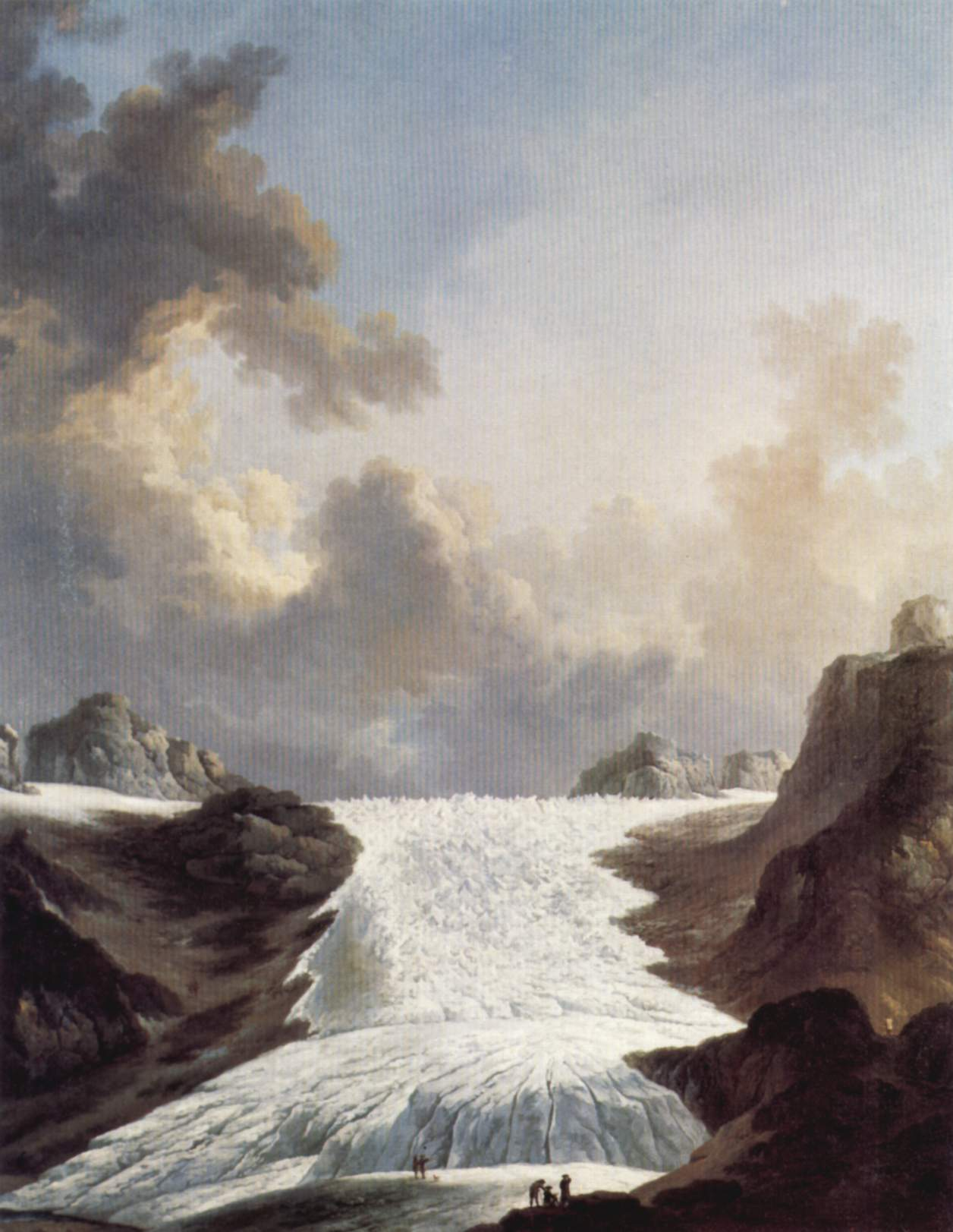
The Rhône Glacier

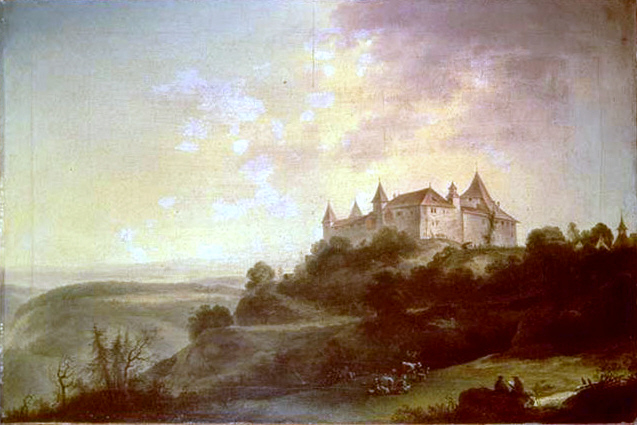
View of Schloss Kyburg

Johann Heinrich Wüest (14 May 1741, Zürich - 7 April 1821, Zürich) was a Swiss landscape painter in the Romantic style.

== Life and work ==
His father was a rope maker. His artistic training took place entirely in Zürich, where he also spent most of his working career. For a time, he studied with Johann Balthasar Bullinger, who recommended that he continue his studies in Holland. As a result, his early works were heavily influenced by Flemish painting from the Dutch Golden Age. During his stay there, he worked closely with his fellow Swiss artist, Jacob Maurer, who introduced him to the art dealer, Cornelis Ploos van Amstel. In 1766, he went to Paris for further studies.

He returned to Zürich in 1769 and was accepted into the painters' guild. Over the next two decades, he developed his own, distinctive style. After Maurer's death, in 1780, Wüest adopted his son. In 1787, he became one of the founders of the Zürcher Künstlergesellschaft (art society).

His best known works are those portraying the Rhône Glacier; done at the behest of the English naturalist, John Strange, in a style reminiscent of Jacob van Ruisdael. His use of rugged landscapes with tiny figures for staffage became essential design elements in Romantic painting. He also worked as a teacher. Among his notable students were Ludwig Hess and Heinrich Freudweiler.
