= Alfred Zellweger =

Swiss electrical engineer (1855–1916)

- Alfred Zellweger in 1905
- Born: 3 September 1855; Trogen, Appenzell Ausserrhoden, Switzerland
- Died: 13 June 1916 (aged 60); Zurich, Switzerland
- Education: Polytechnikum Zürich
- Occupations: Electrical engineer, entrepreneur
- Spouse: Hermine Krüsi (m. 1886)
- Father: Salomon Zellweger

Alfred Zellweger (3 September 1855 – 13 June 1916) was a Swiss electrical engineer and entrepreneur from Trogen, a member of the Zellweger family. In 1880 he acquired a telegraph workshop in Uster and expanded it; his company, A. Zellweger & Cie., was the origin of the global group Zellweger Uster. A pioneer of electrical power transmission, he was known above all for his telephone systems, electric motors and electromagnets.

== Biography ==
Alfred Zellweger was born on 3 September 1855 in Trogen, the son of Salomon Zellweger. In 1886 he married Hermine Krüsi, daughter of Johann Jakob Krüsi, a pharmacist.

From 1871 to 1874 Zellweger did a trainee apprenticeship (Hospitantenlehre) at the Hipp telegraph factory in Neuchâtel, and from 1874 to 1877 he studied at the Polytechnikum in Zurich (now ETH Zurich), followed by further training in Paris and London. He was an electrical engineer and called himself an electrician (Elektriker).

In 1880, with financial support from his father, Zellweger acquired the telegraph workshop of Kuhn & Ehrenberg in Uster. He expanded it together with his partner Wilhelm Heinrich von Ehrenberg until 1892, and alone after that. His company, A. Zellweger & Cie., was the origin of the global group Zellweger Uster.

As a pioneer of electrical power transmission, Zellweger built low-current (Schwachstrom) installations. He became known above all for his telephone systems, electric motors and electromagnets. Several of his inventions were patented, among them a tachograph for vehicles and an electric coffee grinder. The automatic knotting machine (Knüpfmaschine) that he invented was important for the textile industry. Zellweger died in Zurich on 13 June 1916. In 1924 his children sold their shares in the company.

== Bibliography ==
- H. R. Schmid, Alfred Zellweger, Uster, 1855–1916, 1975, 9–60
- D. Gugerli, Redeströme, 1996, 30–43, 74 f.
- Tages-Anzeiger, 1 September 2000
