= Swiss Historical Society =

Society of Swiss historians, founded in 1841

- Schweizerische Gesellschaft für Geschichte
- Formation: 15 September 1841
- Founder: Johann Caspar Zellweger
- Founded at: Bern
- Type: Learned society
- Members: 1,573 (1995)

The Swiss Historical Society (German: Schweizerische Gesellschaft für Geschichte) is the national umbrella organization of Swiss historians. It was founded in Bern on 15 September 1841 on the initiative of Johann Caspar Zellweger of Appenzell as the General Historical Research Society of Switzerland (Allgemeine Geschichtforschende Gesellschaft der Schweiz, AGGS), and it publishes sources and scholarly articles. It has had its present name since April 2001.

== History ==
The Swiss Historical Research Society (Schweizerische Geschichtforschende Gesellschaft), founded in 1811 by Niklaus Friedrich von Mülinen, never grew beyond its circle of members in Bern. It ceased to exist in 1833, in effect with the death of its founder. On 15 September 1841 the AGGS was founded in Bern on the initiative of Johann Caspar Zellweger of Appenzell. Zellweger is also described as the re-founder (Neugründer) of the Schweizerische Geschichtforschende Gesellschaft in 1841; he presided over it until 1843. The AGGS did not see itself as a rival to the cantonal historical societies, but wanted to complement them at the national level and above all to publish editions of sources. Although it was conceived as a purely scholarly umbrella organization of Swiss historians, it could not keep entirely out of politics and was a target of the Radicals as early as its founding years. The AGGS was very reserved toward new currents in method and largely refrained from intervening in personnel matters. It confined itself to publishing sources and scholarly articles:

- Anzeiger für schweizerische Geschichte und Altertumskunde, 1855–1868 (ASG)
- Anzeiger für schweizerische Geschichte, new series, 1870–1920 (ASG)
- Jahrbuch für schweizerische Geschichte, 1876–1920 (JSG)
- Quellen zur Schweizer Geschichte, 1877–1907; new series 1908– (QSG)
- Quellenwerk zur Entstehung der schweizerischen Eidgenossenschaft: Urkunden, Chroniken, Hofrechte, Rödel und Jahrzeitbücher bis zum Beginn des 15. Jahrhunderts, 1933– (QW)
- Zeitschrift für schweizerische Geschichte, 1921–1950 (ZSG)
- Schweizerische Zeitschrift für Geschichte, 1951– (SZG)
- Itinera, 1985–

Until recent times the annual meetings, which were cancelled only in the war years 1870, 1914 and 1939, were the only regular gatherings of the members of the AGGS. The society opened up only from the 1970s: the first Historians' Day (Historikertag) was held in 1973, the first Universities' Day (Universitätentag) in 1974, and new statutes of 1977 allowed sections to be formed for specialist fields (for example military historians, Helvetia Sacra, the Swiss Society for Economic and Social History and the Society for History and Informatics). In 1988 the AGGS and the Swiss Academy of Humanities and Social Sciences (SAGW) set up the Historical Dictionary of Switzerland Foundation (Stiftung Historisches Lexikon der Schweiz). Unlike the cantonal historical societies, which always admitted other friends of history as well as professional historians, the AGGS, apart from its early years, was more strongly oriented toward professional historians. In April 2001 it took the name Schweizerische Gesellschaft für Geschichte (Swiss Historical Society).

The society had 208 members in 1841, 210 in 1891, 298 in 1918, 667 in 1932, 852 in 1968 and 1,573 in 1995.

== Bibliography ==
- Hundert Jahre AGGS 1841–1941, 1941
- Annual reports of the Swiss Society for the Humanities (Jahresbericht der Schweizerischen Geisteswissenschaftlichen Gesellschaft), 1948–1984 (including the annual reports of the AGGS)
- Annual reports of the Swiss Academy of Humanities and Social Sciences (SAGW), 1985– (including the annual reports of the AGGS)
