= Bartholome Zellweger =

Swiss politician and merchant (1625–1681)

- Baptised: 29 December 1625; Trogen, Appenzell Ausserrhoden, Old Swiss Confederacy
- Died: 3 January 1681; Trogen, Appenzell Ausserrhoden, Old Swiss Confederacy
- Occupations: Politician; merchant
- Spouse: Catharina Gruber (m. 1649)
- Parents: Johannes Zellweger (father); Katharina Schiess (mother)
- Relatives: Conrad Zellweger (brother)

Bartholome Zellweger (baptized 29 December 1625 – 3 January 1681) was a Swiss politician and merchant from Trogen in Appenzell Ausserrhoden, a member of the Zellweger family. He was treasurer (Landesseckelmeister) of Appenzell Ausserrhoden from 1664 to 1668 and deputy Landammann (Landesstatthalter) from 1668 to 1681. In 1667 he took part in setting up a linen inspection office (Leinwandschau) in Trogen.

== Biography ==
Bartholome Zellweger was baptized on 29 December 1625 in Trogen, the son of Johannes Zellweger, an innkeeper and treasurer (Landesseckelmeister), and Katharina Schiess. His brother was Conrad Zellweger. In 1649 he married Catharina Gruber, daughter of Johannes Gruber, cantonal ensign (Landesfähnrich).

From 1664 to 1668 Zellweger was treasurer (Landesseckelmeister) of Appenzell Ausserrhoden, and from 1668 to 1681 deputy Landammann (Landesstatthalter). From 1674 to 1679 he was an envoy to the Federal Diet (Tagsatzung).

In 1667 Zellweger took part in setting up a linen inspection office (Leinwandschau) in Trogen, as an intermediary for the Gonzenbach brothers of Hauptwil. From 1675 at the latest he traded in linen himself. He died in Trogen on 3 January 1681.

== Bibliography ==
- W. Schläpfer, Wirtschaftsgeschichte des Kantons Appenzell Ausserrhoden bis 1939, 1984, 51–53
