= Appenzeller Kalender =

Swiss almanac published annually since 1721

- Frequency: Annual
- Publisher: Various (Trogen, Hérisau, Schwellbrunn)
- Country: Switzerland
- Language: German

The Appenzeller Kalender is a Swiss almanac that has been published annually since 1721. It represents one of the oldest continuously published almanacs in Switzerland and follows the traditional format of early modern almanacs, combining religious feast days, astronomical observations, and astrological predictions with popular educational content.

== History ==
=== Origins and early development ===
The almanac was first published in 1721 under the title Schreib-Calender by Johannes Tobler, an amateur astronomer from Rehetobel. Tobler created his own almanac to correct calculation errors he had identified in other calendars of the time. The publication initially combined the traditional elements of early modern almanacs: the liturgical year with religious feast days, astronomical observations, and astrological predictions, alongside news, anecdotes, and brief treatises on natural sciences aimed at a broad public.

Following the Landhandel conflict, which led to increased censorship by the authorities of Appenzell Ausserrhoden, Tobler emigrated to North America in 1736/1737. Before leaving, he entrusted the publication and his calendar calculations covering several years to Gabriel Walser, pastor of Speicher. In 1750, Walser passed the responsibility to Ulrich Sturzenegger, also an amateur astronomer, who had been publishing his own almanac titled Hauß und Bauer Schreib-Calender in the neighboring village of Trogen since 1745.

=== The Sturzenegger era ===
For nearly a century and across four generations, the Sturzenegger family was responsible for the Appenzeller Kalender. In 1767, they established the first printing press in Appenzell Ausserrhoden in Trogen, after the almanac had previously been published in Lindau, Ulm, and St. Gallen. Beginning with the 1764 edition, the almanac was regularly illustrated with engravings, which contributed significantly to its popularity and wide distribution well beyond regional boundaries.

The publication's circulation grew substantially during this period, reaching 50,000 copies by 1830 and peaking at 80,000 copies in 1910. The almanac served as a vehicle for popular education during the Enlightenment, disseminating knowledge in natural sciences, ethnology, and history, as well as current information. As a supraconfessional medium, it became the primary vehicle for popular education in both Appenzell cantons during the second half of the 18th century. Despite its educational mission, the almanac retained traditional elements such as astrological predictions and accounts of supernatural events, which remained key components reflecting early modern worldviews.

=== Modern developments ===
The content of the almanac underwent radical changes around 1850. Stories about exotic countries and cultures gave way to narratives about rural Appenzell life, initially inspired by nationalist sentiments and later by the spirit of intellectual national defense. The publication regularly featured works in dialect and popular literature by renowned authors. From 1805 onwards, the almanac also included Appenzell jokes, which developed into a distinct genre.

The Appenzeller Kalender was published by various publishing houses in Trogen from 1847 to 1975, then in Herisau, and from 2015 in Schwellbrunn. Since the 1990s, editors have revitalized astrological predictions, which had been marginalized since the 19th century, notably through indications related to the lunar calendar. The almanac's circulation declined to 15,000 copies by 2020, but it remains an essential element of the cultural inventory of both Appenzell cantons.

== Bibliography ==
- Böning, Holger. "Aufgeklärte Kalendermacher aus dem Bauernstand – der Appenzeller Kalender und seine Herausgeber." In Schreibkalender und ihre Autoren in Mittel-, Ost- und Ostmitteleuropa (1540-1850), edited by Klaus-Dieter Herbst and Werner Greiling, 459–491. 2018.
- Brunold-Bigler, Ursula. "Den ersten hinkenden Bott neue Zeit herausgegeben oder die Tagebuchnotizen einer Appenzeller Kalendermacherfamilie (1771-1819)." Archives suisses des traditions populaires 79 (1983): 63–84.
- Aragai, David, and Marcel Prohaska. Der Appenzeller Kalender. Zeitmesser, Ratgeber, Kulturgut. 2024.
- Messerli, Alfred. "Transnationale Medienereignisse im Appenzeller Kalender in der zweiten Hälfte des 18. Jahrhunderts in Bild und Text." In Europa in der Schweiz. Grenzüberschreitender Kulturaustausch im 18. Jahrhundert, edited by Heidi Eisenhut, Anett Lütteken, and Carsten Zelle, 231–248. 2013.
- Schläpfer, Walter. Pressegeschichte des Kantons Appenzell Ausserrhoden. 1978.
- Thürer, Georg. "250 Jahre Appenzeller Kalender. Ein Beitrag zur Literatur des kleinen Mannes." Rorschacher Neujahrsblatt 62 (1972): 125–144.
- Tschui, Teresa. «Wie solche Figur zeiget». Der schweizerische Volkskalender als Bildmedium vom 17. bis zum 19. Jahrhundert. 2009.
- Wernicke, Norbert D. «...kurz, was sich in den Kalender schikt.» Literarische Texte in Schweizer Volkskalendern von 1508 bis 1848. Eine Bestandsaufnahme. 2011.
