= Gesner =

Gesner is a surname. Notable people with the surname include:

- Abraham Pineo Gesner (1797–1864), Canadian physician and geologist
- Alonzo Gesner (1842–1912), American politician and surveyor in Oregon
- Conrad Gesner (1516–1565), Swiss naturalist, and botanical reference for Gesner
- Johann Matthias Gesner (1691–1761), German classical scholar
- Clark Gesner (1937-2002), American composer, songwriter, author, and actor

== See also ==
- Gessner
