= Johann Caspar Zellweger =

Swiss entrepreneur and historian

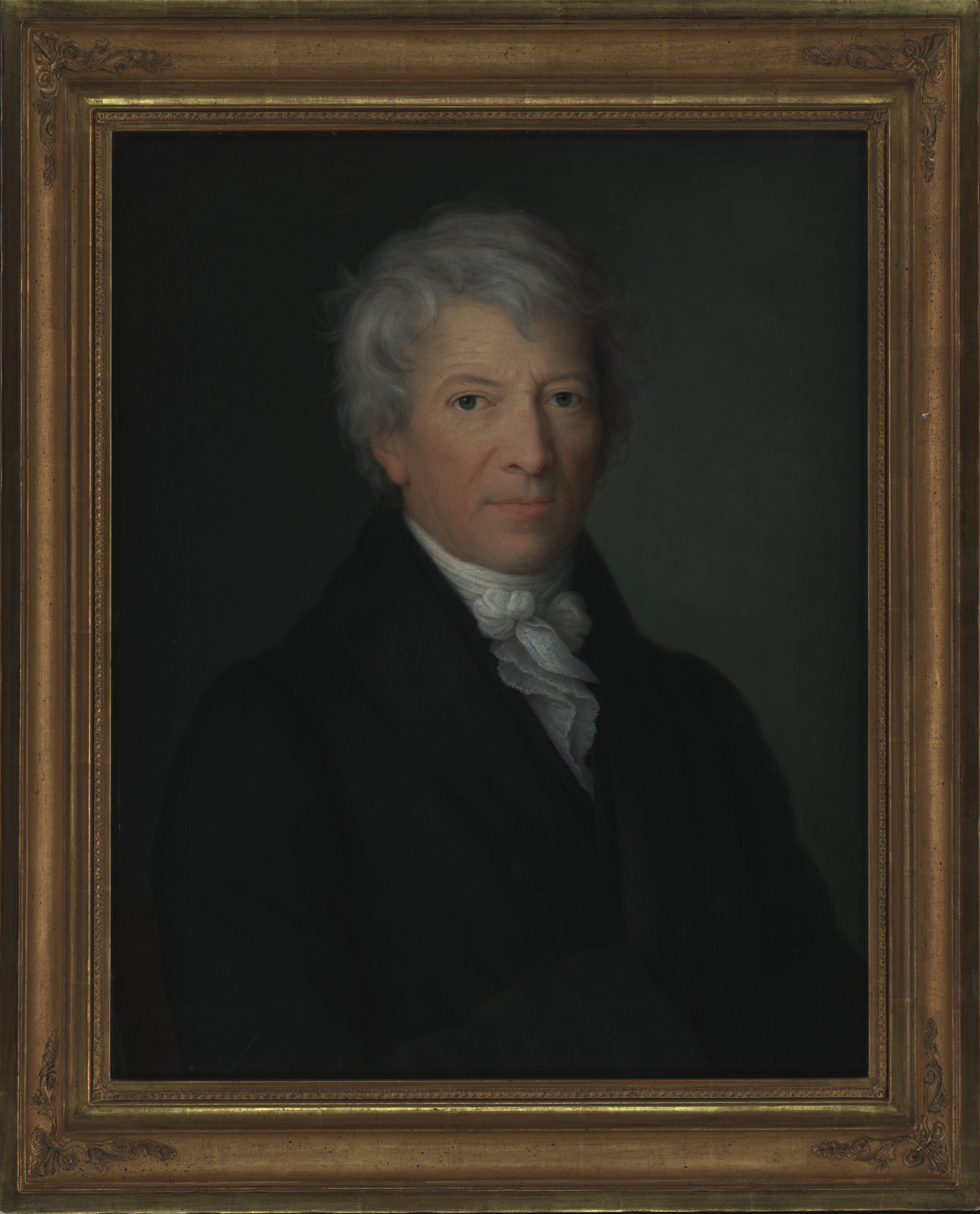
- Baptised: 24 February 1768; Trogen, Appenzell Ausserrhoden
- Died: 31 January 1855; Trogen, Appenzell Ausserrhoden
- Occupations: Entrepreneur, historian, philanthropist
- Spouse: Dorothea Gessner (m. 1790)
- Parent(s): Johannes Zellweger; Anna Hirzel
- Relatives: Jacob Zellweger (brother); Heinrich Gessner (brother-in-law); Konrad Gessner (brother-in-law)

Johann Caspar Zellweger (baptized 24 February 1768 – 31 January 1855) was a Swiss entrepreneur, historian, and philanthropist from Trogen in Appenzell Ausserrhoden. He was a prominent figure in Swiss industry, education, and public welfare, serving as president of the Swiss Society for the Common Good and founder of the Swiss Historical Society.

== Early life and business career ==
Johann Caspar Zellweger was baptized on 24 February 1768 in Trogen. He was the son of Johannes Zellweger and Anna Hirzel. He received private education in Zurich and Trogen, followed by commercial training at the Lyon branch of his father's company from 1782 to 1786. In 1786, he joined the Genoa branch and managed it during the 1790s. In 1790, he married Dorothea Gessner, daughter of Salomon Gessner, making him the brother-in-law of Heinrich Gessner and Konrad Gessner.

Zellweger returned to Trogen in 1799. Upon his father's death in 1802, he became co-owner with his brother Jacob of the trading house Zellweger & Company, taking charge of commercial operations. Between 1802 and 1809, he constructed a stone building in Trogen known as the Fünfeckpalast (Pentagon Palace), which served as both his residence and business headquarters. In 1808, he withdrew from the company due to health reasons but retained direction of the spinning mill established under his initiative in Trogen in 1804. This mill was pioneering for its equipment with powerful hydraulic wheel machines. The factory burned down in 1814, and Zellweger chose not to rebuild it, thus ending his entrepreneurial career.

== Political activities ==
During the Helvetic Republic, Zellweger served as vice-president of the Trogen municipality and member of the education council of the Canton of Säntis (1800–1802). He successfully lobbied to ease the embargo by lifting the ban on raw material imports for the canton. In 1822, his political integrity earned him appointment as federal customs auditor. However, his efforts to establish a customs concordat at the Swiss level failed, leading him to withdraw in 1833.

== Historical scholarship ==
After 1814, beyond his public welfare activities, Zellweger devoted himself to history, conducting source studies and research. He wrote extensive works on the history of Appenzell and on diplomatic relations between Switzerland and France. His major publications included the four-volume Geschichte des Appenzellischen Volkes (History of the Appenzell People, 1830–1840), accompanied by seven volumes of supporting documents (1831–1838), and the two-volume Geschichte der diplomatischen Verhältnisse der Schweiz mit Frankreich von 1698 bis 1784 (History of the Diplomatic Relations of Switzerland with France from 1698 to 1784, 1848–1849). Through these works, Zellweger aimed primarily to contribute to popular education, one of his main priorities.

== Educational and philanthropic work ==
Zellweger viewed education as a means to combat poverty and thereby develop commerce and industry. His spinning mill, which employed many children, had already served him as an experimental pedagogical ground. According to Zellweger, the best educational method consisted of combining hard work during the week with general and religious instruction on Sundays. Inspired by Philipp Emanuel von Fellenberg, he founded the cantonal school of Trogen in 1820 and a school for poor children in 1824. He provided both institutions with the necessary buildings and facilities and had the director of the latter, Johann Konrad Zellweger, trained at his expense at Hofwil. In 1835, he provided the impetus for the founding of the Bächtelen educational institute in Wabern.

Through his activity on the committee of the Swiss Society for the Common Good, Zellweger became a figure of national integration. The society was saved from dissolution thanks to his initiatives in 1823, 1835, and 1850. After 1823, he led it to abandon its theoretical approach and adopt practical philanthropy. His numerous reports and articles earned him considerable social recognition. Zellweger was also among the initiators of the Trogen Savings Bank (1821). He co-founded the Society for Public Welfare of the Cantons of St. Gallen and Appenzell (1822), which he later chaired. In 1841, he founded the Swiss Historical Society (Allgemeine Geschichtforschende Gesellschaft der Schweiz), serving as its president until 1843. He was among Switzerland's most prominent philanthropists. The University of Bern awarded him an honorary doctorate in 1844.

Zellweger died on 31 January 1855 in Trogen.
