= Johannes Zellweger (1730) =

Swiss merchant (1730–1802)

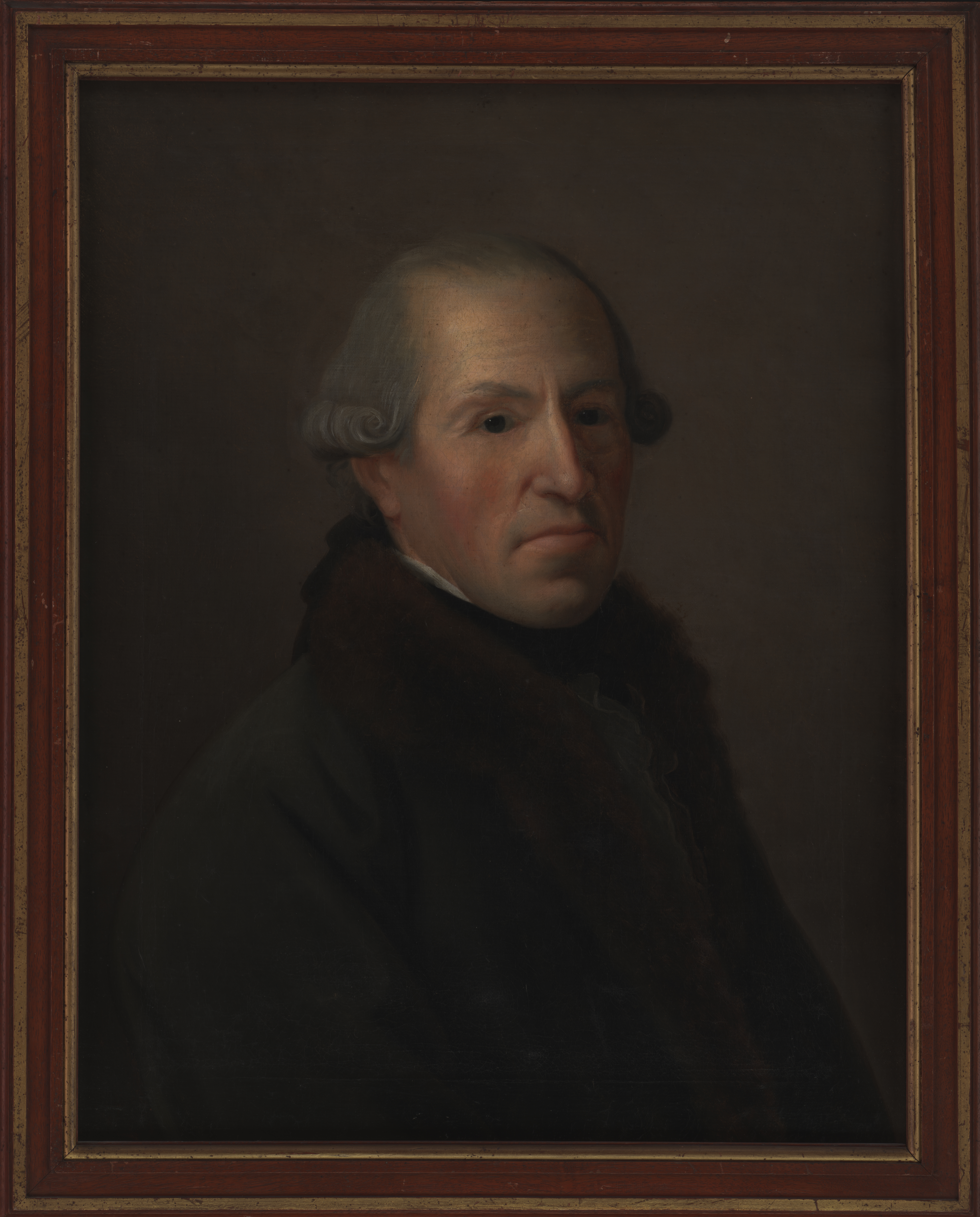
- Baptised: 6 December 1730; Trogen, Appenzell Ausserrhoden
- Died: 21 February 1802; Trogen, Appenzell Ausserrhoden
- Occupation: Merchant
- Known for: Member of one of Switzerland's wealthiest families
- Spouse(s): Barbara Schiess; Anna Hirzel
- Parent: Johannes Zellweger
- Relatives: Hans Caspar Hirzel (brother-in-law); Salomon Hirzel (brother-in-law); Jakob Zellweger (brother); Jacob Zellweger (son); Johann Caspar Zellweger (son)

Johannes Zellweger (baptized 6 December 1730 – 21 February 1802) was a Swiss merchant from Trogen in Appenzell Ausserrhoden. He was one of the wealthiest individuals in Switzerland during his time and represented the Zellweger merchant dynasty at its peak.

== Early life and family ==
Johannes Zellweger was baptized on 6 December 1730 in Trogen, the son of Johannes Zellweger. He was Protestant and belonged to the prominent Zellweger family of Trogen. Until around 1753, he received commercial training at the Lyon branch of his father's company. Zellweger married twice: first to Barbara Schiess, daughter of Johann Ulrich Schiess, and second to Anna Hirzel, daughter of Hans Caspar Hirzel, vice-mayor of Zurich. Through his second marriage, he became brother-in-law to Hans Caspar Hirzel and Salomon Hirzel.

== Business career ==
From 1755, Zellweger became a partner in the Trogen, Lyon and Genoa branches of the company Zellweger Frères & Comp., alongside his brother Jakob Zellweger. In 1774, he separated from his brother and established his own firm, Zellweger Père & Comp., with operations in Trogen, Lyon and Genoa. Between 1789 and 1795, he was a partner in the commercial enterprise Johannes Walser & Co. in Herisau. In the 1790s, he brought his sons Jacob and Johann Caspar into his business, which then became Zellweger & Comp.

== Political activities ==
Zellweger held several political positions in his home region. He served as councillor and communal secretary in Trogen from 1758 to 1760, captain of the quarter in 1760, and ensign of Appenzell Ausserrhoden from 1766 to 1767. In 1798–1799, he went into exile in Bregenz for political reasons.

== Helvetic Society ==
Zellweger became a member of the Helvetic Society in 1764 and served as its president in 1776.
