= Jacob Zellweger =

Swiss politician & merchant (1770–1821)

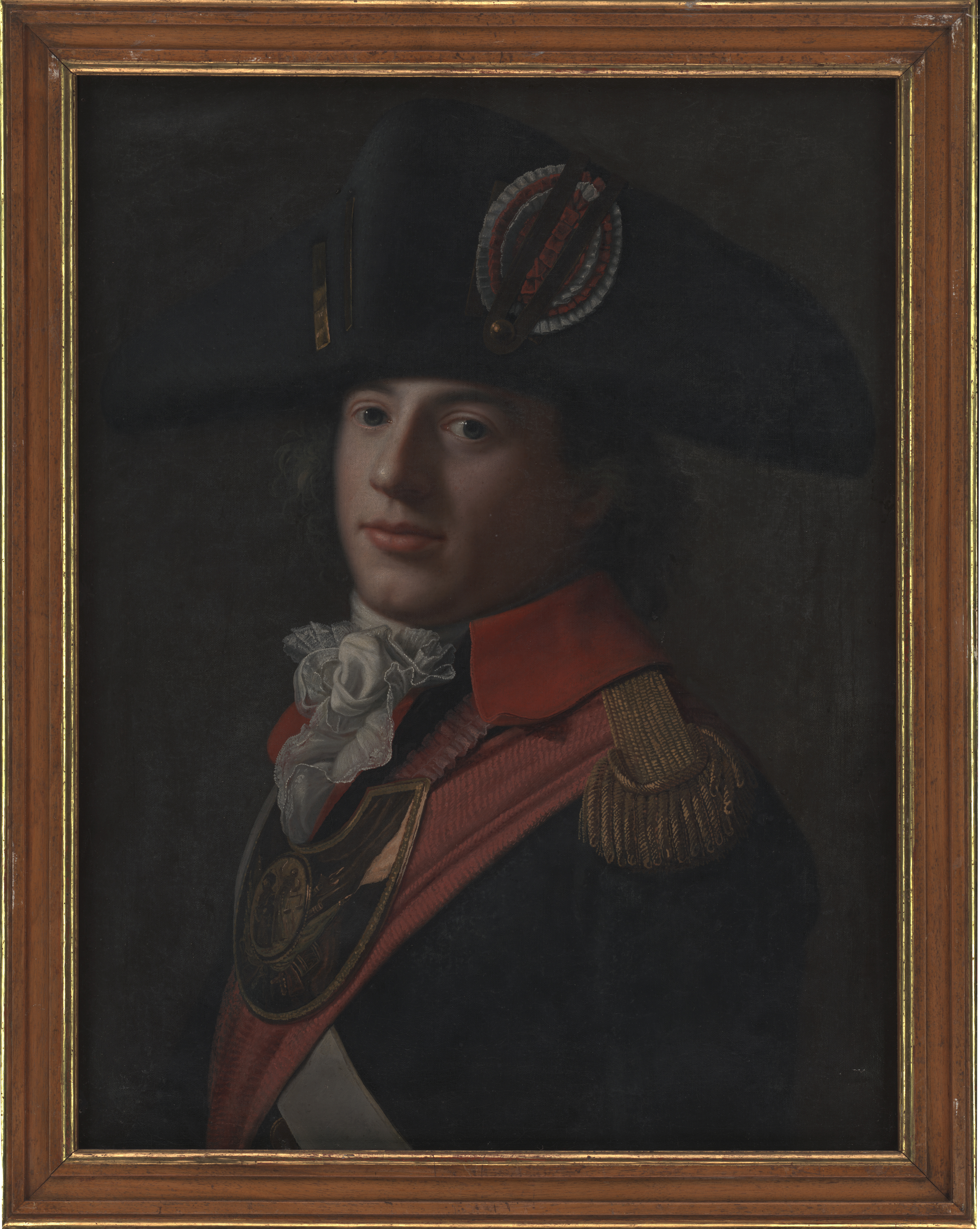

Landammann of Appenzell Ausserrhoden
- In office 1802–1818

Personal details
- Born: 25 December 1770 (baptized) Trogen, Appenzell Ausserrhoden
- Died: 6 April 1821 Rheineck, Canton of St. Gallen
- Spouse: Anna Barbara Zuberbühler
- Parent(s): Johannes Zellweger; Anna Hirzel
- Occupation: Merchant, politician

Jacob Zellweger (baptized 25 December 1770 – 6 April 1821) was a Swiss merchant and politician from Trogen in Appenzell Ausserrhoden. He served as Landammann of Appenzell Ausserrhoden from 1802 to 1818 and was a fervent federalist during the Helvetic Republic and Restoration periods.

== Early life and business career ==
Zellweger was baptized on 25 December 1770 in Trogen. He was the son of Johannes Zellweger and Anna Hirzel. After being tutored in Trogen, he was trained in commerce at his father's company branches in Lyon (1785–1788) and Barcelona (1788–1789). In 1789, he joined the head office in Trogen and became a partner in 1792. He married Anna Barbara Zuberbühler, daughter of physician and councillor Johann Georg Zuberbühler, in 1793.

From 1802, Zellweger directed the commercial house Zellweger & Comp., initially with his brother Johann Caspar Zellweger, then as sole proprietor after his brother's withdrawal in 1808. His business ultimately suffered from his political commitments, insufficient commercial skills, and lavish lifestyle, leading him to liquidate his trade in 1817.

== Political career ==
Zellweger began his political career by serving on the Council of Trogen from 1790 and the Grand Council of Appenzell Ausserrhoden in 1796. He was appointed arsenal superintendent in 1798. During the Helvetic Republic, he went into exile in Vorarlberg from 1798 to 1801.

Upon his return to Appenzell Ausserrhoden, Zellweger experienced a rapid political ascent. He became a deputy to the Helvetic Diet and senator in 1801, and was elected Landammann and delegate to the Diet from 1802 to 1818. His conservative tendencies made him a fervent federalist. Due to his political stance and sustained contacts with Austria, the French imprisoned him for three months (1802–1803) at Aarburg. In 1809–1810, they placed him under house arrest for six months on the pretext of alleged links with Tyrolean insurgents.

Zellweger represented the Confederation in the Canton of St. Gallen (1814–1815) and at the headquarters of General Niklaus Franz von Bachmann during the War of the Sixth Coalition (1815). In his canton, he swiftly restored the old institutions and ruled in an absolutist manner until his deposition in 1818.

== Residence ==
Between 1803 and 1805, Zellweger had a house built in Trogen to serve both as his residence and business premises. After his death, the building was transformed into the seat of government between 1841 and 1842.
