= Konrad Gessner (painter) =

Swiss painter (1764–1826)

- Born: 2 October 1764; Zurich, Old Swiss Confederacy
- Died: 8 May 1826 (aged 61); Zurich, Switzerland
- Occupation: Painter
- Father: Salomon Gessner
- Relatives: Heinrich Gessner (brother); Johann Caspar Zellweger (brother-in-law)

Konrad Gessner (2 October 1764 – 8 May 1826) was a Swiss painter from Zurich, the son of Salomon Gessner. He studied in Dresden, stayed in Rome and Naples, and from 1796 to 1804 lived in Scotland and England, working in etching and lithography in London. In 1804 he settled permanently in Zurich. His most frequent subjects are landscapes and scenes with horses.

== Biography ==
Konrad Gessner was born on 2 October 1764 in Zurich, the son of Salomon Gessner. His brother was Heinrich Gessner. His sister Dorothea married Johann Caspar Zellweger in 1790.

Gessner was taught by his father and by the painter Heinrich Wüest. Around 1782, during a stay with Colonel Salomon Landolt in Greifensee, he discovered his talent for scenes of horses and of war. From 1784 to 1786 he was in Dresden, where he attended the academy and lived with Anton Graff.

In 1786 Gessner was in Zurich, and in 1788–1789 in Rome and Naples. He became acquainted with the artists Johann Heinrich Wilhelm Tischbein and Alexander Trippel. From 1796 to 1804 he lived in Scotland and England; in London he worked in etching and lithography. In 1804 he settled permanently in Zurich.

Gessner's most frequent subjects are landscapes and scenes with horses. He died in Zurich on 8 May 1826.

== Bibliography ==
- Von Gessner bis Turner. Zeichnungen und Aquarelle von 1750–1850, exhibition catalogue, Zurich, 1988
- Biografisches Lexikon der Schweizer Kunst, 391
