= Johannes Zellweger (1695) =

Swiss merchant & politician (1695–1774)

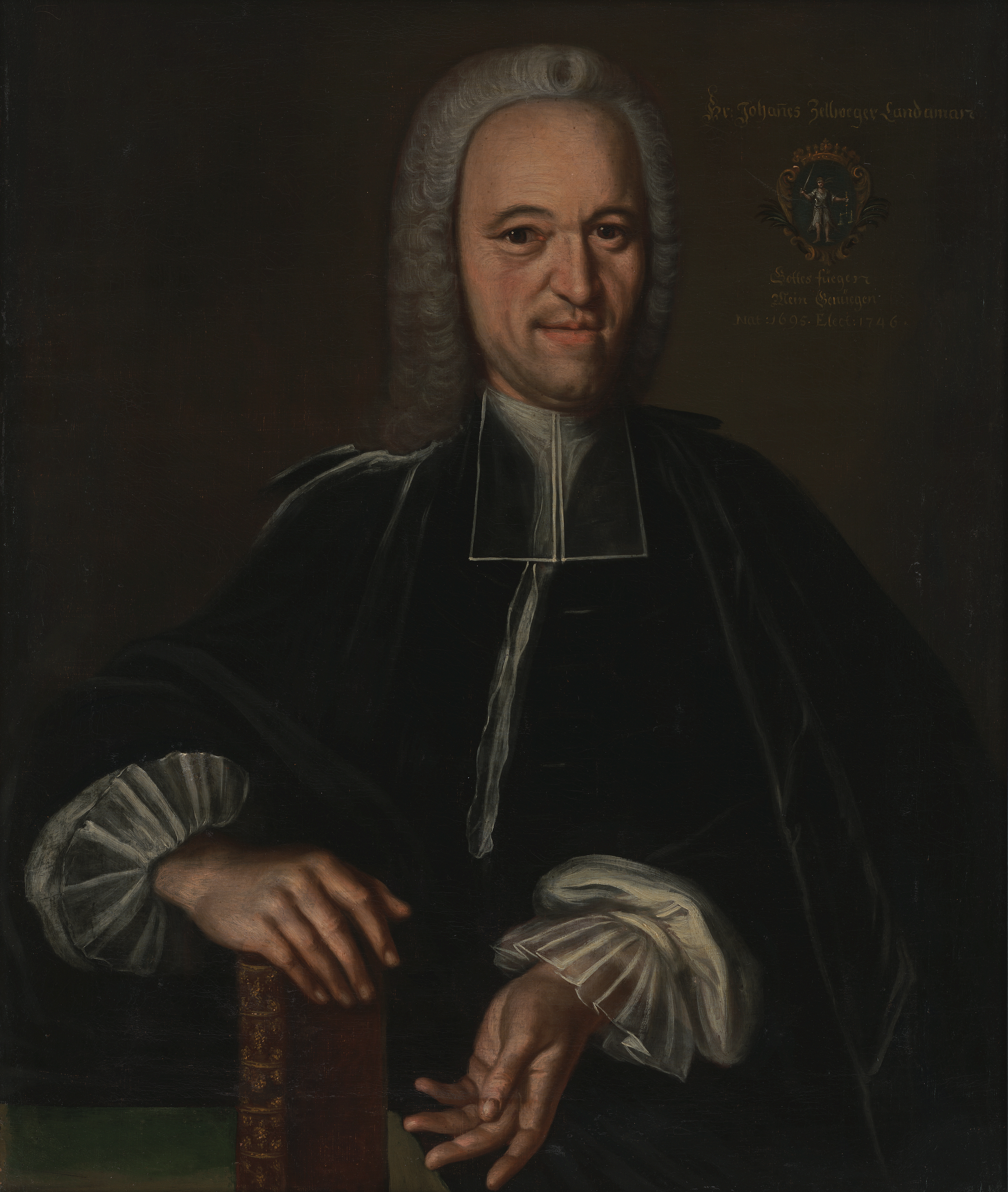
- Baptised: 14 August 1695; Trogen, Appenzell Ausserrhoden, Old Swiss Confederacy
- Died: 11 February 1774; Trogen, Appenzell Ausserrhoden, Old Swiss Confederacy
- Occupations: Merchant, politician
- Spouse: Ursula Sulser (m. 1719)
- Children: Jakob, Johannes, and others
- Parent: Conrad Zellweger
- Relatives: Laurenz Zellweger (brother)

Johannes Zellweger (baptized 14 August 1695 – 11 February 1774) was a Swiss merchant and politician from Trogen in Appenzell Ausserrhoden. He was a member of the prominent Zellweger family and played a significant role in the expansion of the family's commercial enterprise during the 18th century.

== Early life and education ==
Johannes Zellweger was baptized on 14 August 1695 in Trogen, the son of Conrad Zellweger. He was the brother of Laurenz Zellweger. Zellweger attended school in Lyon and subsequently received commercial training in his father's business.

== Commercial career ==
In 1722, Zellweger entered his father's firm as a partner, and from 1726 onward he managed the business together with his brother Conrad (1694–1771). The Zellweger brothers, assisted by the Sulser brothers of Azmoos, who were their relatives through marriage, established branch offices in Barcelona and Lyon. In 1755, Zellweger separated from Conrad and brought his own sons, Jakob and Johannes, as well as his son-in-law Sebastian Honnerlag (1757), into the service of the company Zellweger Frères & Comp. The firm expanded its activities to include cotton and, from the 1760s onward, the embroidery trade. Zellweger retired from the business in 1768.

== Political career ==
Zellweger served as councillor in Trogen from 1741 to 1744, then as captain from 1744 to 1745, and as Landammann of Appenzell Ausserrhoden from 1745 to 1747.

== Personal life ==
In 1719, Zellweger married Ursula Sulser, daughter of Jacob Sulser, who was a transport company owner and Landammann. Through this marriage, Zellweger was connected to the Sulser family of Azmoos, who became important business partners.
