= Ludwig Hess =

Swiss artist (1760–1800)

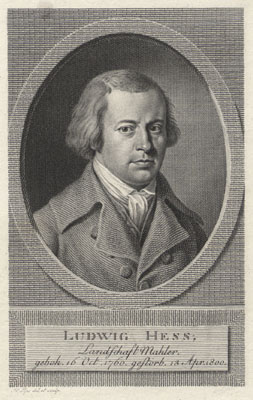
Ludwig Hess

Ludwig Hess (16 October 1760, Zürich – 13 April 1800, Zürich) was a Swiss landscape painter and engraver.

== Biography ==
His father was a butcher and he initially became one as well. In 1785, he was enrolled as a member of Guild of the Ram, one of the Zünfte of Zürich, which included butchers and cattle merchants. After 1790, he served as a Grossrat. That same year. he married Anna Barbara Wegmann.

The painters Johann Heinrich Wüest and Salomon Gessner were his customers and, as early as 1778, he had begun taking lessons from Wüest. In 1784, he also began studying with Gessner. In 1794, he decided to abandon his trade; making trips to Florence and Rome for further study. Most of his early works were Alpine landscapes, notably of Mont Blanc, Rütli and the Tellskapelle and he was an early practitioner of topography. After 1798, he also did copper engravings.

In 2005, a previously unknown biography of him was discovered at the ETH Zürich, in the prints and drawings collection, among documents related to the landscape painter, Carl Gotthard Grass (1767–1814).

== Sources ==
- "Hess, Ludwig" in German, French and Italian in the online Historical Dictionary of Switzerland., 2006
- Ludwig Hess. In: Hans Vollmer (Ed.): Allgemeines Lexikon der Bildenden Künstler von der Antike bis zur Gegenwart. Begründet von Ulrich Thieme und Felix Becker. Vol.16: Hansen–Heubach. E. A. Seemann, Leipzig 1923, pg.585.
- Gerold Meyer von Knonau (1880). "Heß, Ludwig" . Allgemeine Deutsche Biographie (in German). Vol. 12. Leipzig: Duncker & Humblot. pp. 298–299.
