= Johann Ulrich Zuberbühler =

Swiss politician and businessman

- Born: 11 August 1784; Speicher, Appenzell Ausserrhoden
- Died: 8 August 1849 (aged 64); Speicher, Appenzell Ausserrhoden
- Occupations: Businessman, politician
- Spouses: Anna Maria Zürcher (m. 1806) Anna Maria Hirzel (m. 1842)
- Parent(s): Johann Georg Zuberbühler; Katharina Barbara Tobler

Johann Ulrich Zuberbühler (11 August 1784 – 8 August 1849) was a Swiss businessman and politician from Speicher in Appenzell Ausserrhoden.

== Biography ==
Zuberbühler was born on 11 August 1784 in Speicher to Johann Georg Zuberbühler, a physician and councillor, and Katharina Barbara Tobler. He was Protestant and a citizen of Speicher. In 1806, he married Anna Maria Zürcher, daughter of Jakob Zürcher. After her death, he married Anna Maria Hirzel, daughter of Salomon Hirzel, in 1842.

Until around 1810, Zuberbühler worked for the commercial house Zellweger & Comp., where his brother-in-law Jakob Zellweger-Zuberbühler was a partner.

== Political career ==
Zuberbühler held numerous political positions in Speicher and Appenzell Ausserrhoden. He served as councillor from 1814 to 1828, secretary from 1827 to 1828, and president of the commune of Speicher from 1828 to 1832. He was secretary of the commission for the revision of the Constitution of the Outer Rhodes and of the Constituent Assembly from 1831 to 1832. From 1832 to 1834, he served as captain of the country (Landeshauptmann), and in 1833 he was a delegate to the Federal Diet. He was a member of the Grand Council of Appenzell Ausserrhoden from 1836 to 1842.

== Other activities ==
In 1819, Zuberbühler co-founded the Savings Bank of Speicher (Sparkasse Speicher), serving as cashier and administrator until 1847. In 1820, he co-founded the Sun Society (Gesellschaft zur Sonne) in Speicher, the first reading society in the Outer Rhodes.
