= Conrad Zellweger (died 1749) =

Swiss merchant and politician (1659–1749)

- Portrait, 1747
- Baptised: 30 October 1659; Trogen, Appenzell Ausserrhoden, Old Swiss Confederacy
- Died: 17 February 1749; Trogen, Appenzell Ausserrhoden, Old Swiss Confederacy
- Occupations: Merchant; politician
- Spouse: Maria Magdalena Tanner (m. 1691)
- Children: Conrad Zellweger (1694–1771); Johannes Zellweger; Laurenz Zellweger
- Father: Conrad Zellweger
- Relatives: Laurenz Tanner (father-in-law)

Conrad Zellweger (baptized 30 October 1659 – 17 February 1749) was a Swiss merchant and politician from Trogen in Appenzell Ausserrhoden, a member of the Zellweger family. From 1717 he and his son Conrad exported linen to Lyon themselves. He was treasurer (Landesseckelmeister) of Appenzell Ausserrhoden from 1704 to 1721 and deputy Landammann (Landesstatthalter) from 1721 to 1732. As leader of the Linde party in the Landhandel, he was removed from office in 1732 and barred from all offices for life.

== Biography ==
Conrad Zellweger was baptized on 30 October 1659 in Trogen, the son of Conrad Zellweger. In 1691 he married Maria Magdalena Tanner, daughter of Laurenz Tanner (1631–1701). His sons included Conrad (1694–1771), Johannes and Laurenz.

After commercial training from 1679 to 1683 in a St. Gallen trading house in Lyon, Zellweger is said to have narrowly escaped the persecution of Huguenot religious refugees. Back in Trogen, he worked as an agent (Faktor) for merchants from elsewhere, above all for Hans Conrad Hutsch in Feldkirch.

From 1692 to 1698 Zellweger was a member of the council (Ratsherr) and clerk of the parish community (Kirchhöri) of Trogen. He was captain of the Land (Landeshauptmann) of Appenzell Ausserrhoden from 1698 to 1701, treasurer (Landesseckelmeister) from 1704 to 1721 and deputy Landammann (Landesstatthalter) from 1721 to 1732.

From 1717 Zellweger and his son Conrad exported linen to Lyon themselves, set up a warehouse there and employed their own commission agents (Kommissäre). They also continued to buy fabrics on commission for other merchants. In 1719 they suffered heavy losses on investments in an East India company (Ostindische Kompanie). In 1726 Zellweger handed the business over to his sons Conrad and Johannes, and from then on he devoted himself mainly to politics.

Zellweger was twice voted out of the cantonal government: in 1701 in the wake of the calendar dispute (Kalenderstreit), and in 1732 in the Landhandel. In the latter, as leader of the Linde (Soft) party, he was removed from office by the Harte (Hard) party. He had to pay a heavy fine and was barred from all offices for life. He was frugal and had a strict work ethic; his contemporaries accused him of greed. He died in Trogen on 17 February 1749.

== Bibliography ==
- P. Holderegger, Unternehmer im Appenzellerland, 1992, 72, 103
- Appenzeller Geschichte, 2, 157–183
- "Bande der Hochachtung und Liebe", exhibition catalogue, Trogen, 2000, 12–14

=== Archives ===
- State Archives of Appenzell Ausserrhoden (Staatsarchiv Appenzell Ausserrhoden), Herisau: Zellweger commercial archive (Kommerzialarchiv Zellweger), account books
