= Heinrich Gessner =

Swiss printer and publisher (1768–1813)

- Born: 22 November 1768; Zurich, Old Swiss Confederacy
- Died: 19 December 1813 (aged 45); Zurich, Switzerland
- Occupations: Printer; publisher
- Spouse: Charlotte Louise Wieland
- Father: Salomon Gessner
- Relatives: Konrad Gessner (brother); Christoph Martin Wieland (father-in-law); Johann Caspar Zellweger (brother-in-law)

Heinrich Gessner (22 November 1768 – 19 December 1813) was a Swiss printer and publisher from Zurich. From 1798 to 1802 he was the national printer of the Helvetic Republic. He was an important publisher of literature, including works by his father-in-law Christoph Martin Wieland, Johann Heinrich Pestalozzi and Heinrich von Kleist.

== Biography ==
Heinrich Gessner was born on 22 November 1768 in Zurich, the son of Salomon Gessner. His brother was Konrad Gessner. He married Charlotte Louise Wieland, daughter of Christoph Martin Wieland. His sister Dorothea married Johann Caspar Zellweger in 1790.

Gessner was a printer (Buchdrucker) and had his own business from 1797. From 1798 to 1802 he was the national printer (Nationalbuchdrucker) of the Helvetic Republic. He published the periodicals Attisches Museum, Der Republikaner and Allgemeine Schweizerzeitung.

As a publisher, Gessner was important for literature, with works by Christoph Martin Wieland, Johann Heinrich Pestalozzi and Heinrich von Kleist, and for specialist books, with works by Salomon Gessner and Jean Charles Léonard Simonde de Sismondi. He died in Zurich on 19 December 1813.

== Bibliography ==
- P. Leemann-van Elck, Druck, Verlag, Buchhandel im Kanton Zürich von den Anfängen bis um 1850, 1950
