= Conrad Zellweger (died 1705) =

Swiss merchant and politician (1630–1705)

- Portrait, 1697
- Baptised: 14 November 1630; Trogen, Appenzell Ausserrhoden, Old Swiss Confederacy
- Died: 8 January 1705; Trogen, Appenzell Ausserrhoden, Old Swiss Confederacy
- Occupations: Merchant; innkeeper; politician
- Spouse: Anna Rechsteiner
- Parents: Johannes Zellweger (father); Katharina Schiess (mother)
- Relatives: Bartholome Zellweger (brother); Conrad Zellweger (son); Johannes Rechsteiner (father-in-law)

Conrad Zellweger (baptized 14 November 1630 – 8 January 1705) was a Swiss merchant and politician from Trogen in Appenzell Ausserrhoden, a member of the Zellweger family. He was treasurer (Landesseckelmeister) of Appenzell Ausserrhoden from 1668 to 1681 and deputy Landammann (Landesstatthalter) from 1681 to 1702. Together with his son Conrad he is regarded as the founder of the Zellweger trading house.

== Biography ==
Conrad Zellweger was baptized on 14 November 1630 in Trogen, the son of Johannes Zellweger, an innkeeper and treasurer (Landesseckelmeister), and Katharina Schiess. His brother was Bartholome Zellweger. He married Anna Rechsteiner, daughter of Johannes Rechsteiner.

From 1650 Zellweger was a member of the council (Ratsherr) of Trogen. From 1668 to 1681 he was treasurer (Landesseckelmeister) of Appenzell Ausserrhoden, and from 1681 to 1702 deputy Landammann (Landesstatthalter). In 1698 he stayed away from the Landsgemeinde to avoid being elected Landammann.

Zellweger also worked as an innkeeper. The successful linen inspection office (Leinwandschau) is said to have been set up in his house in 1667. From 1675 at the latest he traded in linen himself, working above all as an agent (Faktor) for the Hutsch trading house in Feldkirch. Together with his son Conrad he is regarded as the founder of the Zellweger trading house. He was very wealthy and owned stately properties in Trogen. He died in Trogen on 8 January 1705.

== Bibliography ==
- P. Holderegger, Unternehmer im Appenzellerland, 1992, 64, 100 f.

=== Archives ===
- Cantonal Library of Appenzell Ausserrhoden (Kantonsbibliothek Appenzell Ausserrhoden), Trogen: personal papers (Nachlass)
- State Archives of Appenzell Ausserrhoden (Staatsarchiv Appenzell Ausserrhoden), Herisau: Zellweger commercial archive (Kommerzialarchiv Zellweger), account books
