= Landhandel =

18th-century political crisis in Appenzell Ausserrhoden, Switzerland

- Time: 1714–1735
- Location: Appenzell Ausserrhoden, Switzerland
- Type: Political crisis
- Cause: Customs disputes, constitutional disagreements
- Participants: "Harte" (Hard faction), "Linde" (Soft faction)
- Outcome: Victory of the "Harte" faction

The Landhandel was a major political crisis in Appenzell Ausserrhoden, Switzerland, that lasted from 1714 to 1735. The conflict arose from customs disputes with the Abbey of Saint Gall and the city of St. Gallen, but evolved into a broader constitutional crisis involving fundamental questions about Landsgemeinde democracy, the duties and powers of authorities, and the right to criticism and opposition.

It opposed two factions: the Harte (Hard) representing the new government who had ratified the 1714 Peace of Rorschach, led by the Wetter of Herisau; and the Linde (Soft), representing the old government, which was against some of the terms of the treaty and felt the due process wasn't followed, and was led by the Zellweger of Trogen. The Harte eventually prevailed.

== Background ==
The roots of the Landhandel lay in long-standing customs disputes between Appenzell Ausserrhoden and the Abbey of Saint Gall. In 1704, the people of Ausserrhoden were forced to accept that the Abbot of St. Gallen had the authority to collect transit tolls, though they continued to demand their reduction. During the Second War of Villmergen (1712), Ausserrhoden remained neutral but was represented at the Peace of Rorschach negotiations between 1713 and 1714, as the war had ended in favor of the Reformed cantons.

The controversial Article 83 was established in the 1714 Peace of Rorschach, which obligated Appenzell Ausserrhoden, the Fürstabt, and the city of St. Gallen to resolve disputes peacefully through arbitrators.

== Crisis ==
The delegation that ratified the treaty included Landammann Laurenz Tanner of Herisau and Landammann Konrad Zellweger of Trogen, whose families later formed the "Linde" (Soft) party. The treaty was ratified without presenting it to the Landsgemeinde for approval, which caused significant popular anger and made the 1715 Landsgemeinde particularly turbulent. The period between 1715 and 1732 remained relatively calm due to prosecutions, though tensions persisted both within the population and among the authorities.

In 1732, the dispute over customs duties escalated again. The new government (the "Harte") was no longer willing to conduct arbitration proceedings, which the "Linde" considered unconstitutional. An extraordinary Landsgemeinde was demanded and eventually held on November 20, 1732, in Teufen, which proved to be a triumph for the "Harte" faction.

The "Linde" declared this extraordinary Landsgemeinde illegal and refused to abide by its decisions. The situation nearly escalated to armed conflict: On December 28, 1732, 4,000 men gathered outside Trogen for an attack. On March 5, 1733, close combat in Gais left one dead and many wounded. The two sides then prepared for war, but changed their minds at the last moment, as neither side was truly prepared to die.

== Resolution ==
On April 29, 1733, an ordinary Landsgemeinde took place in Hundwil, which was well-attended and conducted peacefully. Landammann Laurenz Wetter resigned due to his advanced age, and his son Adrian Wetter was elected as the new Landammann. The controversial Article 83 was again rejected, and the decisions from the Teufen Landsgemeinde were confirmed.

In 1734, leading members of the "Linde" faction were excluded for life from council and court, formally ending the crisis. However, the effects of the Landhandel continued to influence the region's internal politics into the 19th century.

== Bibliography ==
- G. Walser, Der Appenzeller Chronik dritter Theil 1732-1763, 1830
- Walter Schläpfer, Appenzeller Geschichte, vol. 2, Appenzell Ausserrhoden von 1597 bis zur Gegenwart, Herisau, 1972, pp. 160-182
- F. Brändle, Demokratie und Charisma, 2005
