= Trogen, Switzerland =

Trogen
- Municipality
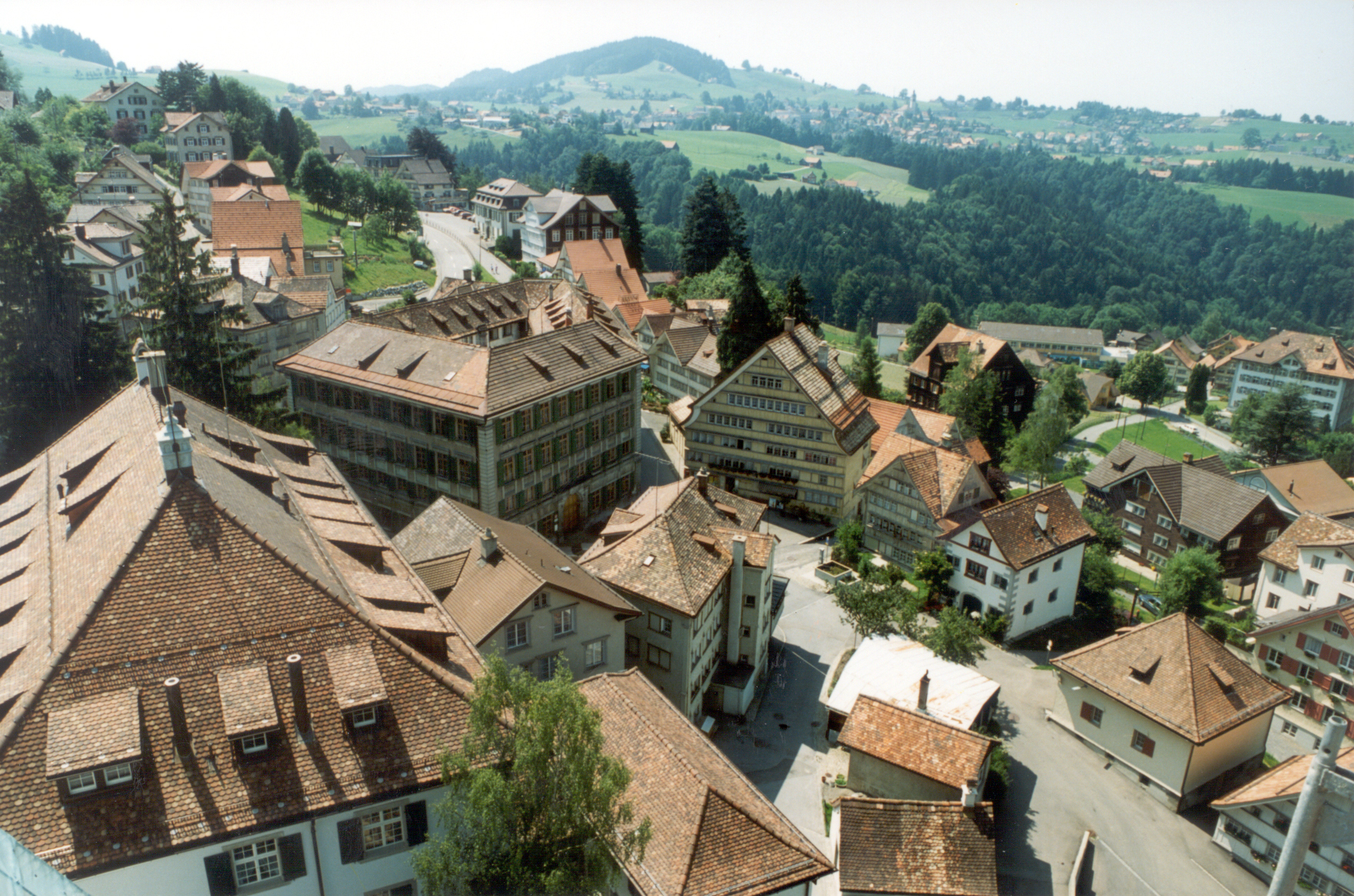
- View of Trogen from the church

- Flag Coat of arms
- Location of Trogen
- Location within Switzerland Location within Canton of Appenzell Ausserrhoden
- Coordinates: 47°24′N 9°28′E
- Country: Switzerland
- Canton: Appenzell Ausserrhoden
- District: n.a.

Area
  - Total: 10.01 km^{2} (3.86 sq mi)
- Elevation: 903 m (2,963 ft)

Population (December 2008)
  - Total: 1,688
  - Density: 168.6/km^{2} (436.8/sq mi)
- Time zone: UTC+01:00 (CET)
  - Summer (DST): UTC+02:00 (CEST)
- Postal code: 9043
- SFOS number: 3025
- ISO 3166 code: CH-AR
- Surrounded by: Altstätten (SG), Bühler, Gais, Oberegg (AI), Rehetobel, Speicher, Wald
- Website: www.trogen.ch

Trogen (Swiss Standard German pronunciation: [ˈtroːɡn̩]) is a municipality in the canton of Appenzell Ausserrhoden in Switzerland. The town is the seat of the canton's judicial authorities.

== History ==
The first mentioning of Trogen was in 1168 (Trugin). The name Trogen refers to a number of fountains (Trögen) which is reflected in the coat of arms.

After the Appenzell Wars, the Rhode Trogen was created in 1429 which included the territories of the municipalities Oberegg as well as parts of Bühler and Gais. Trogen joined the Reformation in 1525. When Appenzell split into the half-cantons Appenzell Innerrhoden and Appenzell Ausserrhoden in 1597, it became the administrative center of Appenzell Ausserrhoden. From then on, Trogen's territory progressively shrunk as different municipalities within built their own churches within the Rhode and thus became independent. Until 1658, the municipalities of Grub, Walzenhausen, Heiden, Wolfhalden and Lutzenberg had emerged from Trogen.

From the 16th century until the Industrial Revolution, Trogen accumulated most of its wealth through the sales of weaved and embroidered fabrics. This enrichment was driven mainly by the trade of canvases by the Zellweger-family. The Zellweger trading house was founded in the 17th century by the father of the family Conrad Zellweger-Rechsteiner and his son Conrad Zellweger-Tanner. The so-called Zellweger-Paläste (Zellweger-palaces), which are built around the town center, Landsgemeindeplatz, of Trogen, were built by the different members and generations of the family. The buildings led to inner tensions within the Zellweger-family and partial dissolutions of business alliances, as every new building was meant to outdo the previous palaces. The last Zellweger-owned business went bankrupt in 1817, and since 1866, the Landsgemeindeplatz has remained unmodified. A renovation of the town center and the palaces was voted for in 2011 and executed from 2019 to 2021. The grammar school (Kantonsschule) that is today the only grammar school in the canton was also founded by the family in 1821.

In the beginning of the 20th century, Trogen's main source of income was the textile industry, as 66% of its inhabitants were active in this sector. At the same time, the village began to expand its sources of income by slowly developing its health and ski resort infrastructure, which also led to the foundation of the Strassenbahn St. Gallen–Speicher–Trogen in 1900 and the inauguration of the Trogenerbahn three years later. During the interwar period from 1918 to 1939, Trogen's number of inhabitants sank drastically. Although the economy recovered thereafter, the town never again surpassed its 1850 peak population.

Trogen has been the home of the Kinderdorf Pestalozzi since 1946. Further, Trogen has been an Energiestadt since 2014.The label attests that the municipality is making particular efforts in climate protection such as more ecological transportation, investments in renewable energy sources and more efficient usage of energy.

== Geography ==
Aerial view (1949)

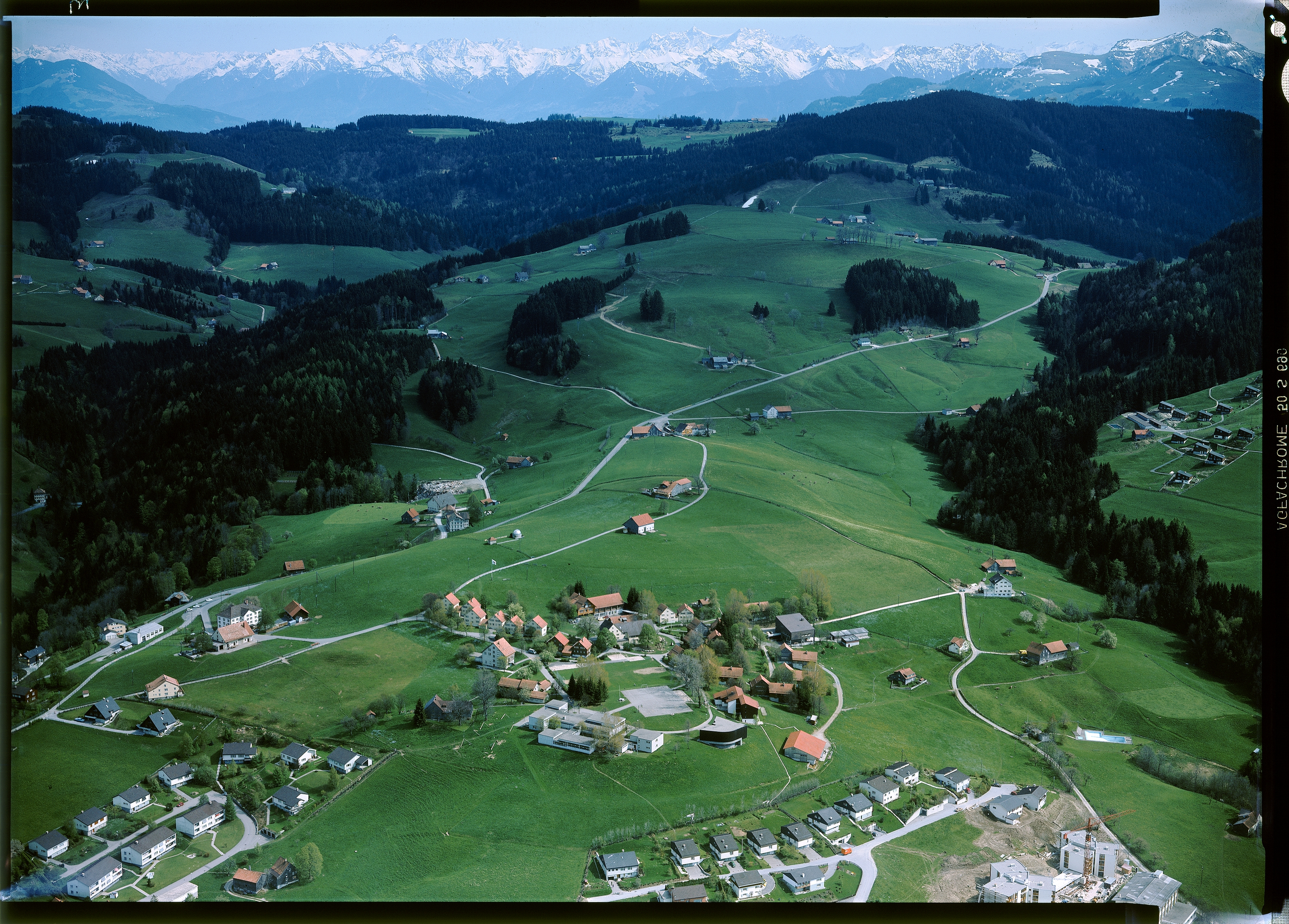
Countryside above Trogen with the Appenzell Alps in background

Trogen has an area, as of 2023, of 10.03 km^{2} (3.87 sq mi). Of this area, 49.2% is used for agricultural purposes, while 41.4% is forested. Of the rest of the land, 8.6% is settled (buildings or roads) and the remainder (0.8%) is non-productive (rivers, glaciers or mountains). Trogen is dominated by the local mountain Gäbris.

== Demographics ==
Trogen has a population (as of 2008) of 1,688, of which about 7.7% are foreign nationals. Over the last 10 years the population has decreased at a rate of -15.2%. Most of the population (as of 2000) speaks German (92.9%), with Serbo-Croatian being second most common ( 2.0%) and Italian being third ( 0.9%). As of 2000, the gender distribution of the population was 50.3% male and 49.7% female. The age distribution, as of 2000, in Trogen is; 130 people or 7.0% of the population are between 0–6 years old. 271 people or 14.5% are 6–15, and 149 people or 8.0% are 16–19. Of the adult population, 80 people or 4.3% of the population are between 20 and 24 years old. 502 people or 26.9% are 25–44, and 452 people or 24.2% are 45–64. The senior population distribution is 186 people or 10.0% of the population are between 65 and 79 years old, and 97 people or 5.2% are over 80.

In the 2007 federal election the FDP received 66.8% of the vote.

In Trogen about 74.8% of the population (between age 25–64) have completed either non-mandatory upper secondary education or additional higher education (either university or a Fachhochschule).

Trogen has an unemployment rate of 1.46%. As of 2005, there were 62 people employed in the primary economic sector and about 34 businesses involved in this sector. 76 people are employed in the secondary sector and there are 20 businesses in this sector. 751 people are employed in the tertiary sector, with 86 businesses in this sector.

The historical population is given in the following table:

Population development											
Year	1667	1734	1813	1850	1900	1950	1980	2000	2005	2010	2021
Number of inhabitants	2262^{*}	2250^{**}	2370	2611	2496	2142	1853	1867	1751	1687	1877

^{*}(incl. Wald, Rehetobel)^{**}(excl. Wald, Rehetobel)

== Heritage sites of national significance ==
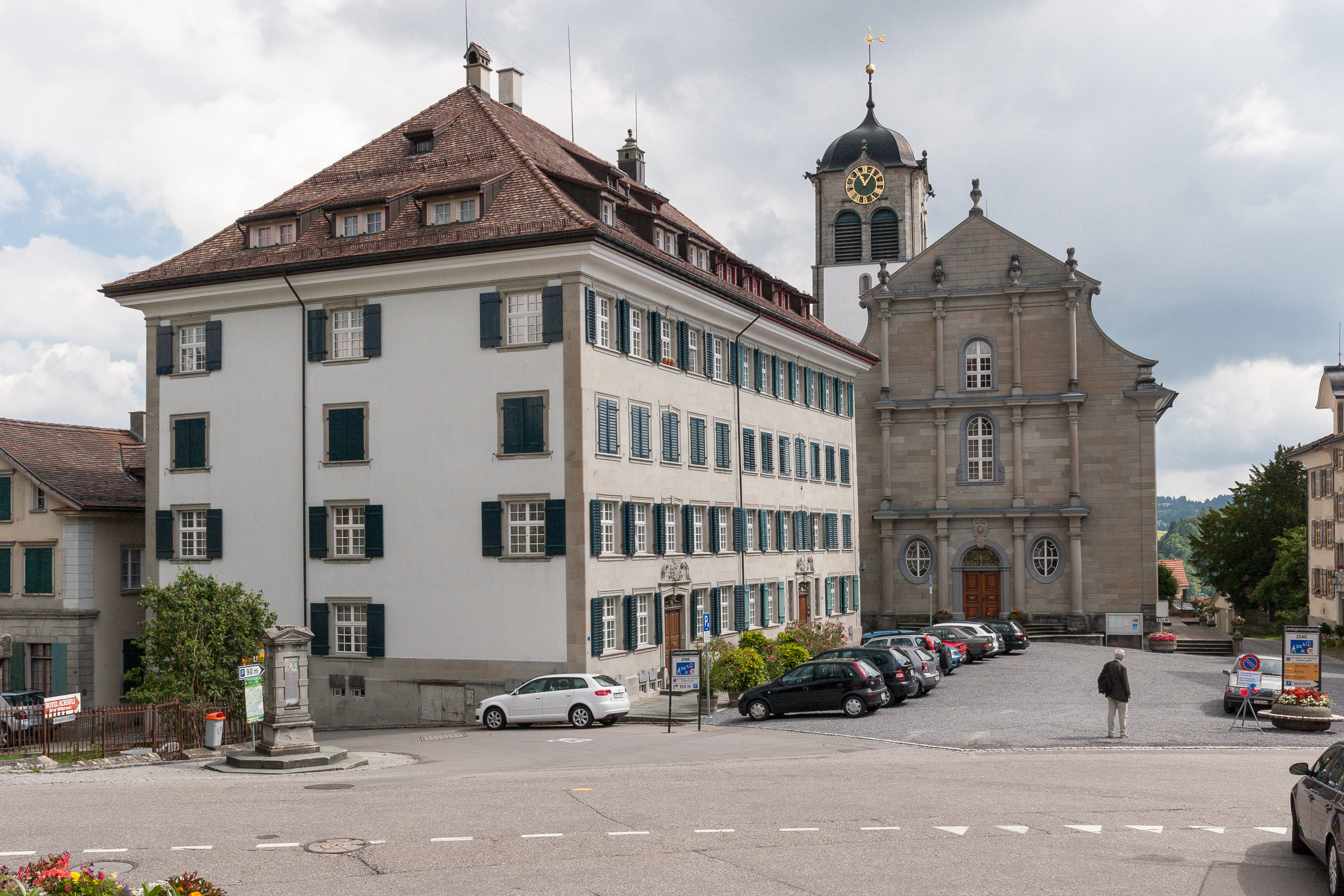
Zellweger Palace and Church

Several buildings in the village core, the Protestant church of 1782, the refectory with the cantonal library, the 1805 town hall and the two Zellweger palaces (Doppelpalast / Fünfeckpalast) are listed as heritage sites of national significance.

== Weather ==
Trogen has an average of 155.1 days of rain per year and on average receives 1,644 mm (64.7 in) of precipitation. The wettest month is July during which time Trogen receives an average of 209 mm (8.2 in) of precipitation. During this month there is precipitation for an average of 14.2 days. The month with the most days of precipitation is June, with an average of 15.4, but with only 203 mm (8.0 in) of precipitation. The driest month of the year is January with an average of 86 mm (3.4 in) of precipitation over 14.2 days.

== Transport ==
Trogen is linked to the city of St. Gallen and Appenzell by the Appenzell–St. Gallen–Trogen railway, a narrow-gauge road-side railway line. The line operates two trains per hour throughout the day, with four trains per hour during peak periods. Services are operated by Appenzell Railways for S-Bahn St. Gallen. There are two stations within the municipality, Trogen and Gfeld. The journey from St. Gallen to Trogen takes 25 minutes.

== Notable people ==
- Mark Staff Brandl (* 1955), artist and art historian, lives in Trogen
- Wangpo Tethong (born 1963), Swiss-Tibetan activist, writer, spokesperson of Greenpeace Switzerland and member of the 15th Tibetan Parliament in Exile.
