= Minder (surname) =

Minder is a surname of Germanic origin.

== People with the name ==
- Andy Minder (fl. 1907–1943), American jockey
- Erhard Minder (1925–2002), Swiss Olympic athlete
- Hans Minder (fl. 1908–1928), Swiss Olympic wrestler
- Hansüli Minder (born 1958), Swiss sports shooter
- Matthias Minder (born 1993), Swiss footballer
- Peter Minder (born 1956), Swiss Olympic athlete
- Raphael Minder (born 1971), Swiss journalist and writer
- Sándor Minder (1907–1983), Hungarian ice hockey player
- Thomas Minder (born 1960), Swiss entrepreneur and politician
- Walter Minder (1905–1992), Swiss mineralogist and chemist

== See also ==
- Minder (disambiguation)
