= Ueli =

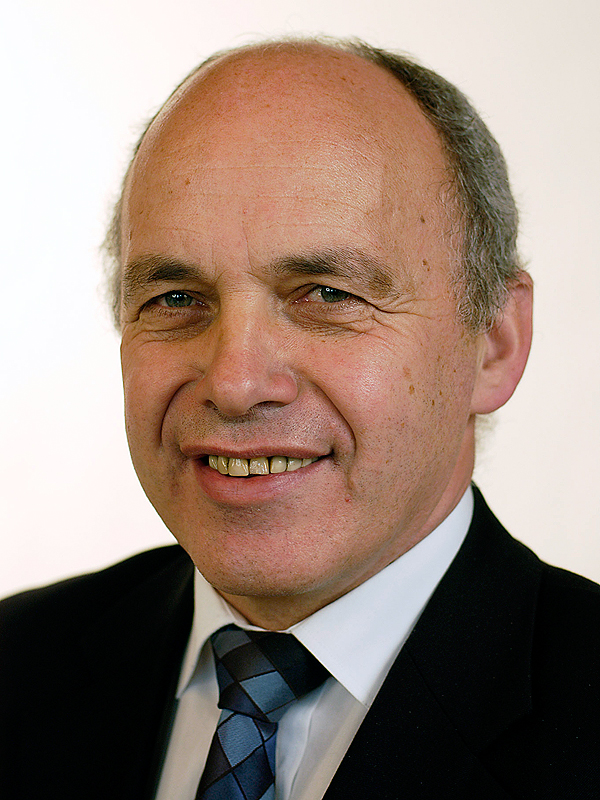
Ueli Maurer

Ueli (German: [ˈuəli]) is the Swiss hypocoristic form of the masculine given name Ulrich. People with the given name Ueli include:

- Ueli Aebi (1946–2025), Swiss structural biologist
- Ueli Bächli (born 1950), Swiss bobsledder
- Ueli Bachmann (born 1950), Swiss gymnast
- Ueli Beck (1930–2010), Swiss actor and radio presenter
- Ueli Bodenmann (born 1965), Swiss rower
- Näppis-Ueli Bräker (1735–1798), alias of Swiss writer Ulrich Bräker
- Ueli Falk (born 1950), Swiss judoka
- Ueli Forster (born 1939), Swiss businessman
- Ueli Gegenschatz (1971–2009), Swiss skydiver
- Ueli Götsch (1925–2017), Swiss journalist and politician
- Ueli Isler (born 1946), Swiss rower
- Ueli Jäggi (born 1954), Swiss actor and director
- Ueli Kestenholz (1975–2026), Swiss snowboarder
- Ueli Leuenberger (born 1952), Swiss politician
- Ueli Matti (born 1959), Swiss slalom canoeist
- Ueli Maurer (born 1950), Swiss politician
- Ueli Maurer (cryptographer) (born 1960), Swiss cryptographer
- Ueli Mülli, Swiss curler
- Ueli Prager (1916–2011), Swiss businessman
- Ueli Rotach (d. 1405?), Appenzell folk hero
- Ueli Sarbach (born 1954), Swiss sports shooter
- Ueli Scheidegger (born 1938), Swiss ski jumper
- Ueli Schenkel (born 1959), Swiss luger
- Ueli Schibler (born 1947), Swiss biologist, chronobiologist and professor
- Ueli Schmezer (born 1961), Swiss journalist, presenter and musician
- Ueli Schnider (born 1990), Swiss cross-country skier
- Ueli Staub (1934–2012), Swiss vibraphonist
- Ueli Steck (1976–2017), Swiss mountain climber
- Ueli Steiger (born 1954), Swiss cinematographer
- Ueli Sutter (1947–2025), Swiss cyclist
- Ueli Wiget (born 1957), Swiss musician

Fictional character:

- Ueli (also Uli), eponymous protagonist in two novels by Jeremias Gotthelf (1841, 1849) and the 1950s films Uli the Farmhand and Uli the Tenant

== See also ==
- Uli
- Hansueli
