= Hans-Ulrich =

Hans-Ulrich or Hans Ulrich is a German masculine given name. Notable people with the name include:

- Hans Ulrich Aschenborn (born 1947), animal painter in Southern Africa
- Hans-Ulrich Back (1896–1976), German general in the Wehrmacht during World War II
- Hans-Ulrich Brunner (1943–2006), Swiss painter
- Hans-Ulrich Buchholz (1944–2011), German rower
- Hans-Ulrich Dürst (born 1939), Swiss former swimmer
- Hans Ulrich von Eggenberg (1568–1634), Austrian statesman
- Hans Ulrich Engelmann (1921–2011), German composer
- Hans-Ulrich Ernst (1920–1984), known as Jimmy Ernst, American painter born in Germany
- Hans Ulrich Fisch (1583–1647), Swiss painter
- Hans Ulrich Franck (1590–1675), German historical painter and etcher from Kaufbeuren, Swabia
- Hans-Ulrich Grapenthin (born 1943), German former footballer
- Hans Ulrich Gumbrecht (born 1948), literary theorist whose work spans epistemologies of the everyday
- Hans-Ulrich Indermaur (born 1939), Swiss television moderator, journalist, writer, and magazine editor
- Hans Ulrich Klintzsch (1898–1959), Oberster SA-Führer, supreme commander of the Sturmabteilung (SA) from 1921 to 1923
- Hans-Ulrich Klose (1937–2023), German politician from the Social Democratic Party
- Hans-Ulrich Millow (born 1942), German former swimmer
- Hans-Ulrich Obrist (born 1968), art curator, critic and historian of art
- Hans-Ulrich von Oertzen (1915–1944), German officer in Army Group Centre of the Wehrmacht during the Second World War
- Hans-Ulrich Reissig (born 1949), German chemist, professor of Organic Chemistry at FU Berlin
- Hans-Ulrich Rudel (1916–1982), German ground-attack pilot during World War II
- Hans Ulrich von Schaffgotsch (1595–1635), Silesian nobleman, fought in the Silesian front of the Thirty Years' War
- Hans Ulrich Schmied or Uli Schmied (born 1947), retired German rower who specialized in the double sculls
- Hans-Ulrich Schmincke (born 1937), German volcanologist
- Hans-Ullrich Schulz (1939–2012), German sprinter
- Hans Ulrich Staeps (1909–1988), German composer, music professor and professional recorder player
- Hans Ulrich Steger (1923–2016), Swiss caricaturist, children's author and artist
- Hans-Ulrich Thomale (born 1944), German football manager
- Hans-Ulrich Treichel (born 1952), Germanist, novelist and poet
- Hans-Ulrich Wehler (1931–2014), German left-liberal historian
- Hans-Ulrich Wittchen (born 1951), German clinical psychologist and psychotherapist
- Hans-Ulrich von Luck und Witten (1911–1997), German officer in the Wehrmacht of Nazi Germany during World War II
- Hans Ulrich Zellweger (1909–1990), Swiss-American pediatrician known for his research on Zellweger syndrome

== See also ==
- 10032 Hans-Ulrich, minor planet discovered 1981
- Hansueli
