= Mövenpick =

Mövenpick may refer to:

- Mövenpick Hotels & Resorts
- Mövenpick Ice Cream
