= Eduard Preiswerk =

Swiss merchant (1829–1895)

- Born: 19 March 1829; Basel, Switzerland
- Died: 2 April 1895 (aged 66); Basel, Switzerland
- Occupation: Merchant
- Spouses: Maria Burckhardt (m. 1852) Emma Groben (m. 1873)
- Children: Wilhelm Preiswerk
- Parents: Emanuel Preiswerk (father); Marie Sophie Hunziker (mother)

Eduard Preiswerk (19 March 1829 – 2 April 1895) was a Swiss merchant from Basel. From 1853 he ran his father's colonial goods business together with his brother Carl. From 1864 he headed the Missions-Handlungs-Gesellschaft, later the Basler Handelsgesellschaft, and built it up into a central financial pillar of the Basel Mission.

== Biography ==
Eduard Preiswerk was born on 19 March 1829 in Basel, the son of Emanuel Preiswerk, a merchant, and Marie Sophie Hunziker. In 1852 he married Maria Burckhardt, daughter of Peter Burckhardt, a judge (Gerichtsherr), and in 1873 Emma Groben. His son was Wilhelm Preiswerk.

Preiswerk served a commercial apprenticeship in the cloth wholesale business of Benedict Bischoff. From 1848 to 1851 he was a bookkeeper and cashier at the bank Martin & Pury in Neuchâtel. In 1851 he joined his father's colonial goods business, which he ran together with his brother Carl from 1853. In Basel he co-founded the stock exchange association (Börsenverein) and the trade and industry association (Handels- und Industrieverein), and he was one of the initiators of the chamber of commerce (Handelskammer). From 1858 to 1876 he was a member of the civil court (Zivilgericht), and from 1867 to 1884, with interruptions, a liberal-conservative member of the Grand Council.

From 1863 Preiswerk was a member of the committee of the Basel Mission, and in 1864 he took over the management of the Missions-Handlungs-Gesellschaft (later the Basler Handelsgesellschaft). He always opposed a secularization of the philanthropic enterprise, and until his death he built it up into a central financial pillar of the Basel Mission. He died in Basel on 2 April 1895.

== Bibliography ==
- G. A. Wanner, "Eduard und Wilhelm Preiswerk", in Schweizer Pioniere der Wirtschaft und Technik 39, 1984
