= Hansueli =

Hansueli (or Hans-Ueli and Hans Ueli) is a Swiss masculine given name. It consists of the names Hans and Ueli, a Swiss diminutive form of Ulrich.

== People ==
- Hansueli von Allmen (born 1946), Swiss politician
- Hansueli Gürber (1951–2022), Swiss Jugendanwalt
- Hansueli Gygax (1942–2017), Swiss handball player and entrepreneur
- Hansueli Havenith (born 1944), Swiss footballer
- Hans Ueli Hohl (1929–2020), Swiss businessman and councillor
- Hans-Ueli Kreuzer (born 1950), Swiss cross-country skier
- Hansueli Minder (born 1958), Swiss sports shooter
- Hansueli Mumenthaler (born 1943), Swiss middle-distance runner
- Hansueli Oberer (1929–2005), Swiss footballer
- Hans-Ueli Rihs (born 1944), Swiss entrepreneur
- Hansueli Schenkel (1946–2022), Swiss cinematographer
- Hansueli Schmutz (born 1950), Swiss equestrian
- Hans-Ueli Vogt (born 1969), Swiss jurist, law professor and politician
- Thomas Hansueli Zurbuchen (born 1968), Swiss-American astrophysicist

== See also ==
- Hans-Ulrich
