= Ulrich Zellweger =

Swiss banker and entrepreneur (1804–1871)

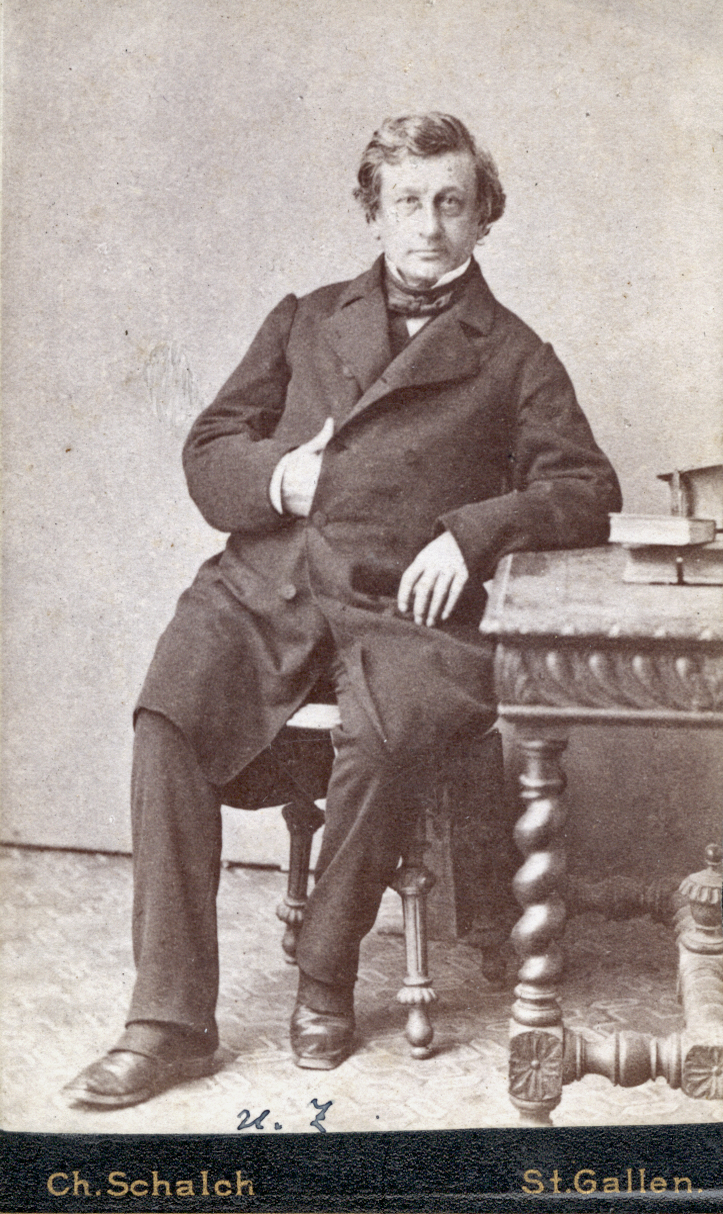
- Born: 5 August 1804; Trogen, Appenzell Ausserrhoden, Switzerland
- Died: 19 January 1871 (aged 66); Trogen, Appenzell Ausserrhoden, Switzerland
- Occupations: Banker, entrepreneur
- Known for: Founder of Ulrich Zellweger et Cie bank in Paris
- Spouse(s): Elisabetha Potts (m. 1837) Cécile Ryhiner (m. 1850)
- Parent: Jacob Zellweger
- Relatives: Jakob Zellweger-Hünerwadel (brother); Salomon Zellweger (brother)

Ulrich Zellweger (5 August 1804 – 19 January 1871) was a Swiss banker and entrepreneur from Trogen in the Canton of Appenzell Ausserrhoden. He founded the banking house Ulrich Zellweger et Cie in Paris and was a prominent figure in Swiss commercial and philanthropic circles during the 19th century.

== Early life and education ==
Ulrich Zellweger was born on 5 August 1804 in Trogen to Jacob Zellweger. He was the brother of Jacob and Salomon Zellweger. He attended school in Ludwigsburg and Stuttgart from 1816 to 1819, followed by commercial training in Marseille from 1819 to 1823.

== Business career ==
From 1823 to 1830, Zellweger was a partner in the trading house Orelli & Zellweger in London. He later became a partner in a business enterprise in Havana, Cuba, from 1835 to 1842. After returning to Switzerland, he lived as a rentier in Trogen from 1842 to 1848.

In 1848, Zellweger founded the banking house Ulrich Zellweger et Cie in Paris, which became a flourishing enterprise. In 1859, he founded the Missions-Handlungs-Gesellschaft (now Basler Handelsgesellschaft) in Basel and served as its first president until 1864. In 1866, he became the first president of the Bank of Appenzell Ausserrhoden, a position he held until his death in 1871.

== Philanthropy and religious activities ==
Zellweger supported charitable works in his home canton and founded the Lindenbühl educational establishment in Trogen in 1856, which included a model farm and a weaving school. His time in England made him a representative of "positive" Protestantism with orthodox tendencies. To promote his religious ideals, he created the Appenzeller Sonntagsblatt in 1862.

== Personal life ==
Zellweger married twice. His first marriage in 1837 was to Elisabetha Potts, daughter of Jakob Potts and widow of Adolf Herrmann, a physician in Baltimore, Maryland. His second marriage in 1850 was to Cécile Ryhiner, daughter of Christoph Ryhiner, owner of a schappe spinning mill.

Zellweger died on 19 January 1871 in Trogen at the age of 66.
