= Wilhelm Preiswerk =

Swiss merchant (1858–1938)

- Born: 22 February 1858; Basel, Switzerland
- Died: 2 March 1938 (aged 80); Basel, Switzerland
- Occupation: Merchant
- Spouse: Julia Imhoff (m. 1891)
- Parents: Eduard Preiswerk (father); Maria Burckhardt (mother)

Wilhelm Preiswerk (22 February 1858 – 2 March 1938) was a Swiss merchant from Basel. From 1895 until his death he was president of the Missions-Handlungs-Gesellschaft, later the Basler Handelsgesellschaft. Under his leadership the company was legally separated from the Basel Mission in 1917, and in 1921, after its assets in the British colonies had been confiscated, he saved the firm by creating the operating company Union Trading Company International.

== Biography ==
Wilhelm Preiswerk was born on 22 February 1858 in Basel, the son of Eduard Preiswerk and Maria Burckhardt. In 1891 he married Julia Imhoff, daughter of Wilhelm Ludwig Imhoff, a bill broker (Wechselsensal).

Preiswerk served a commercial apprenticeship with the Basel colonial goods house Lichtenhahn. In 1883 he joined his father's colonial goods firm, which he took over in 1895 together with his brother Paul. He was vice-president of the Basel Chamber of Commerce (Basler Handelskammer) in 1913–1920 and 1923–1925.

From 1884 Preiswerk was a member of the committee of the Basel Mission, and in 1895 he became president of the Missions-Handlungs-Gesellschaft (later the Basler Handelsgesellschaft), an office he held until his death. Under his leadership the company was legally separated from the Basel Mission in 1917. After its assets in the British colonies had been confiscated, Preiswerk saved the firm in 1921 by creating the operating company Union Trading Company International. His sons William and Max carried on the business. He died in Basel on 2 March 1938.

== Bibliography ==
- G. A. Wanner, "Eduard und Wilhelm Preiswerk", in Schweizer Pioniere der Wirtschaft und Technik 39, 1984
- A. Franc, Wie die Schweiz zur Schokolade kam, 2008
