= Bâloise =

Swiss insurance holding company

Bâloise Holding AG
- Type: Aktiengesellschaft
- Traded as: SIX: BALN
- Industry: Financial services
- Founded: 1863 (Basler Versicherungsgesellschaft gegen Feuerschaden); 1962 (Bâloise Holding)
- Headquarters: Basel, Switzerland
- Key people: Michael Müller (CEO), Carsten Stolz (CFO), Andreas Burckhardt (Chairman)
- Products: Insurance, banking, pensions
- Revenue: CHF 8.981 billion (2015)
- Operating income: CHF 511.1 million (2015)
- Total assets: CHF 78.783 billion (end 2015)
- Total equity: CHF 5.462 billion (end 2015)
- Number of employees: 7,300 (FTE, end 2015)
- Website: www.baloise.com

Bâloise Holding AG was a Swiss insurance holding company founded in 1863 and headquartered in Basel.

== History ==
The Basler Versicherungen was founded in 1863 as Basler Versicherungsgesellschaft gegen Feuerschaden, insuring inhabitants of Basel against fire damage. This was prompted by the tragic fire incident in Glarus - in the following year, the company already expanded to cover life and transportation, as well as expanding geographically within Switzerland and abroad. At the end of the decade, the insurer added its own reinsurance business to the portfolio.

By the early 20th century, the business was booming and the company even dabbled in the U.S. market. However, they had exited the U.S. again by the time of the 1906 San Francisco earthquake, avoiding any insurance loss created by that natural catastrophe. World War I presented a difficult time to do business, but Baloise was able to continue expanding internationally even during the depression before World War II. During the War, the headquarters were evacuated due to proximity to both the French and German border and 115 tons of files were moved to a secure location protected by the Swiss army near Saanen. After the war, Baloise was able to grow as part of Europe's economic advances and in 1962, the separate parts of the business all became part of holding structure.

The 1970s and 1980s brought new international subsidiaries, such as in Austria, and acquisitions, including Deutscher Ring Leben in Germany, a majority stake in Mercator in Belgium, and the Providence Washington Insurance Company in the U.S. Many of these businesses were later sold, while new ones were acquired.

In 2007, baloisedirect.ch was launched as the company's online insurance provider, offering insurance for vehicles, personal liability insurance, home contents insurance, legal expenses insurance and travel insurance.

In April 2025, Helvetia and Baloise announced a plan to merge to create Switzerland's second-largest insurance group with a combined business volume of 20 billion Swiss francs ($24.69 billion). The new group would be called Helvetia Baloise Holding.

== Holding structure ==
Bâloise Holding operated in Europe through various subsidiaries:

- Switzerland: Basler Versicherungen Schweiz, Baloise Bank, Baloise Asset Management, Baloise Fund Invest
- Germany: Basler Versicherungen, Deutscher Ring
- Liechtenstein: Baloise Life
- Belgium: Baloise Insurance
- Luxembourg: Bâloise Assurances

The company was listed on the SIX Swiss Exchange. The biggest shareholders of Bâloise were Chase Nominees and BlackRock.

On July 1, 2023, Michael Müller took the post as CEO from Gert De Winter, who was CEO for eight years.
