= Minder (disambiguation) =

A minder is a person who is assigned to watch over another person.

Minder may also refer to:

- Minder (surname)
- Minder (TV series), a 1979–1994 British television series and a 2009 revival of the original
- Minder (video game), a 1985 video game created by Don Priestley, based on the British television series of the same name
- "Minder" (The Upper Hand), a 1993 television episode
- Minder the Golem, a female character in DC Comics' Forgotten Realms comic book series
- The Minder, a 2006 Argentine film
- The Minders, an American rock band
