= Erika Forster-Vannini =

Swiss politician (born 1944)

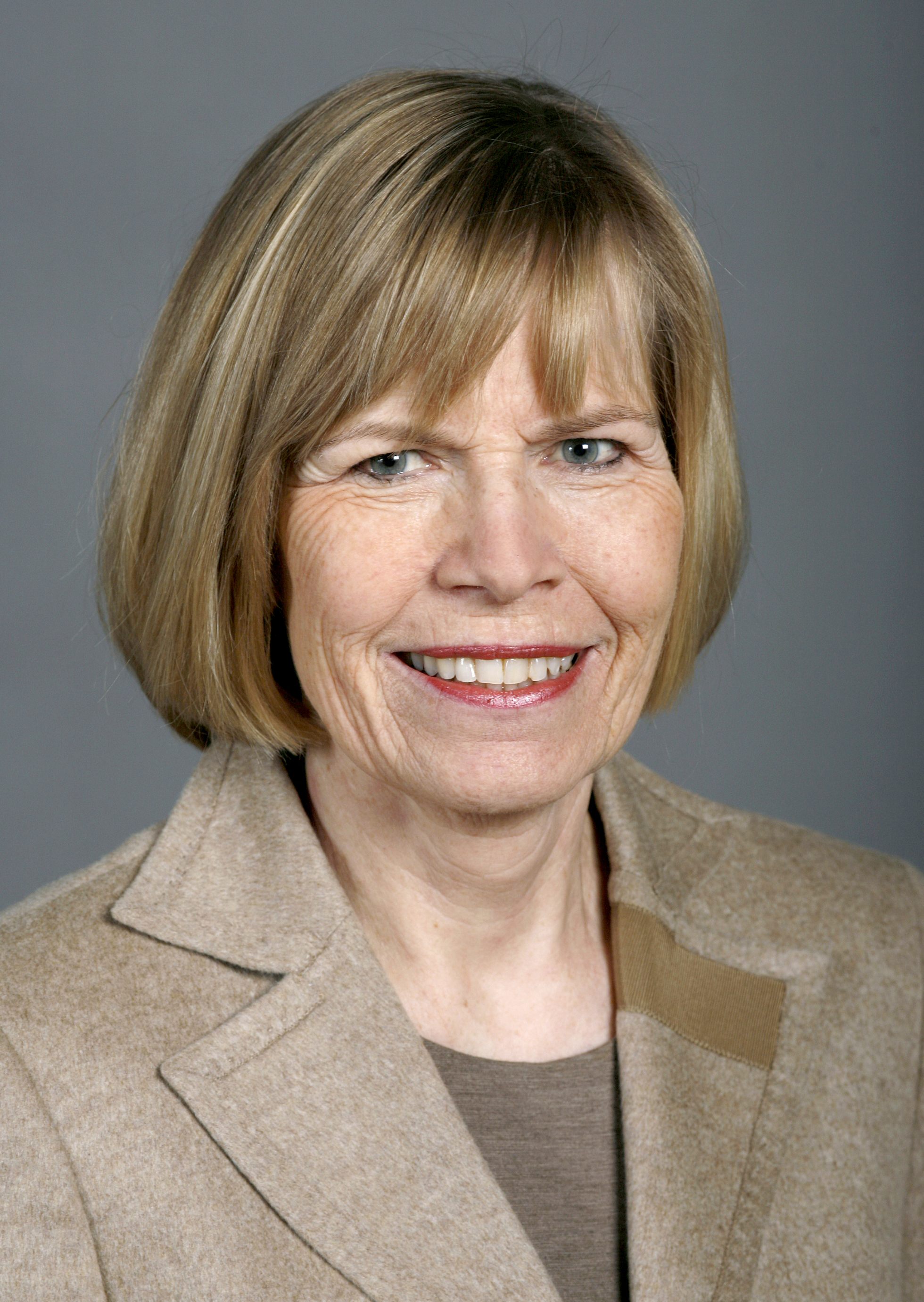

President of the Swiss Council of States 2009-10
- Constituency: Canton of St. Gallen

Personal details
- Born: Erika Vannini; February 27, 1944 (age 82) Zürich, Zürich, Switzerland
- Party: The Liberals
- Spouse: Ueli Forster
- Children: 4
- Occupation: Businesswoman, politician
- Website: erikaforster.ch (inactive)

Erika Forster-Vannini (née Vannini; born 27 February 1944) is a Swiss businesswoman and politician. She served as a member on the Council of States (Switzerland) for The Liberals from 1995 to 2011, which she presided from 2009 to 2010. Between 1988 and 1996 she served on the Grand Council of St. Gallen, which she presided in 1994/1995.

== Early life and education ==
Forster was born 27 February 1944 in Zürich, Switzerland, a daughter of Hans 'Jean' (1902-2005) and Emilie Vannini. She has two sisters. She completed her Matura in Zürich and then completed several exchanges abroad.

Her father operated a construction/painting company in the second generation. Jean Vannini was primarily known for his activities in the creation of subsidized housing together with Ernst Göhner. They founded several wood manufacturing companies and built over 4,000 apartments primarily in the region of Zürich. Through his membership on the municipal council of Zürich, he befriended and allied with Gottlieb Duttweiler, founder of Migros. The Vannini family originally hailed from Villa Luganese in Ticino, Switzerland, where they originated since the 15th century. Her great-grandfather, a famous sculptor, settled in Hottingen (Zürich) and took municipal citizenship there in 1870.

== Career ==
After her stays abroad, she completed flight attendant training, and worked four years at Swissair.

She held many other offices, including President of the Foundation for the Protection of the Swiss Landscape, Member of the Board of the Association of Private Limited Companies, Member of the Board of the Minergie Association, President of the Foundation for Psychiatric Services for Young People in the Canton of St. Gallen, President of the Supervisory Board of the Institute for Management and Human Resources Management at the University of St. Gallen, and President of the Board of Directors of ERSIAN, Zürich.

== Politics ==
Mrs Forster-Vannini's political career began in 1977 when she was elected to the St. Gallen City Council. She served as President of that body in 1982 and remained a member until 1988, when she became a member of the St. Gallen Cantonal Council. She served as President of the Cantonal Council in 1994-5, after which she was elected to the Council of States. She was a member of the Council of States from 1995 to 2011.

She has been outspoken about maternity health issues, passive smoking and internet addiction.

== Personal life ==
She met her husband, Ueli Forster (born 1939), in the early 1970s. He hailed from a textile manufacturing family of St. Gallen, who owned Forster Rohner AG. Her husband is Ueli Forster and she has four children and four grandchildren. They reside in St. Gallen.

Preceded by Alain Berset	President of the Council of States; 2009/2010	Succeeded by Hansheiri Inderkum
