= Ueli Forster =

Swiss businessman and textile manufacturer

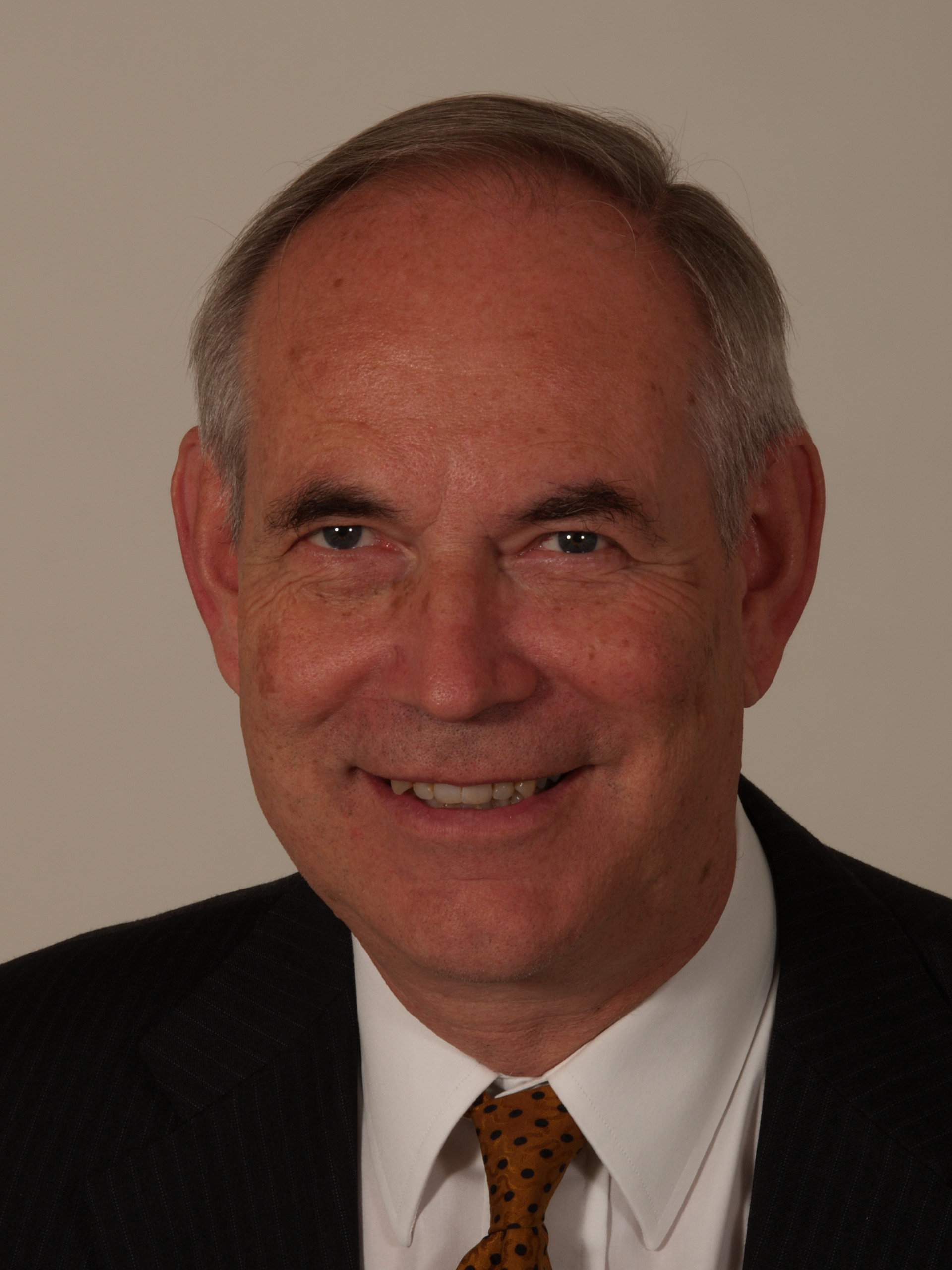
- Ueli Forster (about 2005)
- Born: Ulrich Niklaus Willi Forster; October 20, 1939 (age 86); St. Gallen, St. Gallen, Switzerland
- Education: University of St. Gallen (Licentiate)
- Occupation: Businessman
- Years active: 1963 - present
- Known for: President and Chairman of Forster Rohner AG, formerly member of the Banking Council at Swiss National Bank and president of Economiesuisse
- Political party: The Liberals
- Spouse: Erika Vannini
- Children: 4

Ulrich Niklaus Willi Forster known as Ueli Forster (born 20 October 1939) is a Swiss businessman, textile manufacturer and majority owner of Forster Rohner AG, the worldwide leader of embroidery manufacturing, founded in 1904. He was a member of the Banking Council of the Swiss National Bank from 2002 to 2007 as well as the president of Economiesuisse from 2001 to 2006.

== Early life and education ==
Forster was born on 20 October 1939 in St. Gallen, Switzerland, to Willy C. Forster (1899–1964) and Doris (née Geret) Forster. He has three brothers. He studied economics at the University of St. Gallen, where he graduated with a Licentiate.

== Career ==
In 1963, Forster entered the family embroidery business, then known as Forster, Willi & Co. in St. Gallen. After the death of his father he took-over the management of the growing manufacturing company. In 1988, he became president and chairman of the group, after the family acquired Jacob Rohner AG, then the largest embroidery manufacturer in the Rhine Valley region, he was responsible for the merger to Forster Rohner AG, in 1992.

Today, Forster Rohner AG, is known as worldwide leader in embroidery textile products. It is specialized in lingerie, haute couture and prêt-à-porter. Their creations are used by several high-end fashion brands, as well as having been worn by officials, most prominently at the Presidential inauguration of Barack Obama, where Michelle Obama has worn their embroidery. The group employs about 650 people in Switzerland and China. Rohner stepped back from operative management on January 1, 2007, leaving the management to his children Emanuel and Caroline Forster.

In 2009, Forster, his wife Erika Forster-Vannini and two partners, founded the carbon technology company Bionic Composite Technologies AG and has ever since served as its chairman. He was a former board member of Frisco Findus AG (frozen foods), Weavery Uznaberg and at Helvetia Insurance.

== Economic policy ==
He was President of the St.Gallen Association of Commerce and Industry (1978 to 1986), member of the Chamber of Commerce, 1987 to 1991, founding President of the St.Gallen-Appenzell Chamber of Commerce and Industry (1991 to 1997), long-standing President of the Association of Swiss Embroidery Exporters, President of the Association of Swiss Yarn and Fabric Exporters and President of Economiesuisse (2001 to 2006). He was also a board member of the Swiss Textile Association (1994 to 2009) and a member of the Bank Council of the Swiss National Bank (2002 to 2007).

== Personal life ==
Forster is married to Erika Forster-Vannini (b. 1944), former member and president of the Council of States (Switzerland). They have four children and reside in St. Gallen.
