= Salomon Zellweger =

Swiss businessman (1807–1887)

- Born: 2 August 1807; Trogen, Appenzell Ausserrhoden, Switzerland
- Died: 15 March 1887 (aged 79); Trogen, Appenzell Ausserrhoden, Switzerland
- Occupation: Businessman
- Known for: Co-founder of Helvetia Insurance
- Spouse: Anna Walser (m. 1837)
- Parent: Jacob Zellweger
- Relatives: Jakob Zellweger-Hünerwadel (brother); Ulrich Zellweger (brother)

Salomon Zellweger (2 August 1807 – 15 March 1887) was a Swiss businessman and textile merchant from Trogen in the Canton of Appenzell Ausserrhoden. He was a co-founder of Helvetia Insurance and played a significant role in the economic development of eastern Switzerland in the 19th century.

== Early life and education ==
Zellweger was born on 2 August 1807 in Trogen to Jacob Zellweger. He was the brother of Jacob and Ulrich Zellweger. He attended schools in Ludwigsburg and from 1821 to 1824 studied at the Kantonsschule in Trogen. He completed a commercial apprenticeship with his brother-in-law Georg Friedrich Krauss in Rheineck.

== Career ==
Until 1830, Zellweger served as a representative of his brother-in-law's firm in Brussels. From 1830 to 1837, he managed a trading house for cotton and textiles in Amsterdam. In 1837, he returned to Trogen where he owned a textile export and manufacturing firm until 1874.

In 1858, Zellweger was a co-founder of the Allgemeine Versicherungs-Gesellschaft Helvetia (General Insurance Company Helvetia), and in 1861 he co-founded the Helvetia Schweizerische Feuerversicherungs-Gesellschaft (Helvetia Swiss Fire Insurance Company). He served as vice-president of the administrative council of these insurance companies until his death in 1887. In 1866, he was a co-initiator of the Bank für Appenzell A.Rh. From 1865 to 1874, he served as vice-president of the Appenzellische Gemeinnützige Gesellschaft (Appenzell Public Welfare Society).

As an authority on economic and customs policy matters, Zellweger was repeatedly entrusted with missions by the Swiss Federal Council.

== Personal life ==
In 1837, Zellweger married Anna Walser, daughter of Bartholome Walser, the municipal headman of Heiden. He was Reformed. Zellweger died on 15 March 1887 in Trogen.
