= Dennis Armitage =

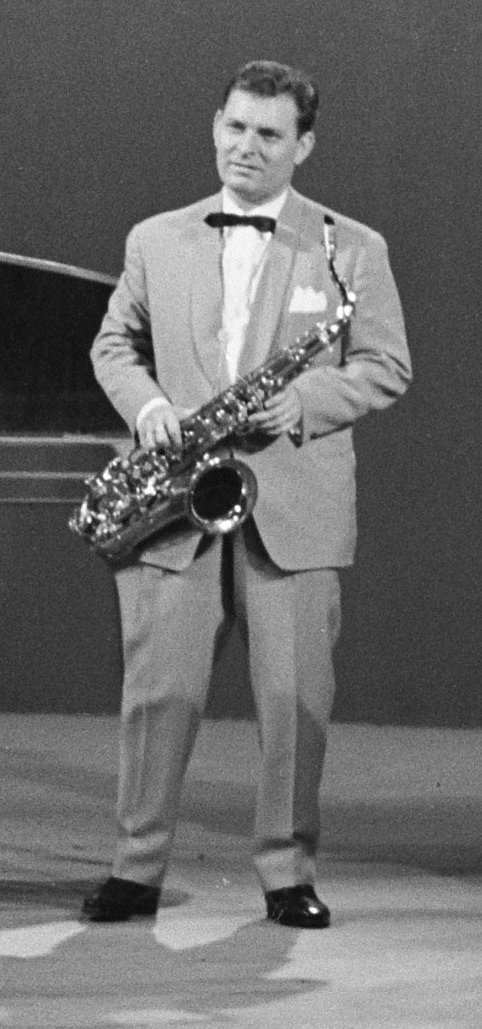
- Dennis Armitage in Amsterdam in 1961
- Born: 28 May 1928; Leeds, West Yorkshire, England
- Died: 5 November 2005 (aged 77); Zurich, Switzerland
- Other name: Darmi
- Occupations: Musician; pianist; saxophonist; composer; arranger; painter
- Musical career
- Genres: Jazz
- Instruments: Saxophone; piano
- Years active: 1943–2005

Dennis Armitage (/ˈdɛnɪs ˈɑːrmɪtɪdʒ/; 28 May 1928 – 5 November 2005) was a British pianist, saxophonist, composer, arranger, and painter. He was a member of the Hazy Osterwald - Sextett (1951–1966) and mainly played the saxophone, although he learnt to play the piano at an early age.

== Life ==
Armitage was born in Leeds, West Yorkshire, England, in 1928 and received piano lessons at the age of seven, performing at important events in Leeds at the age of fifteen. A year later, he would perform in his first big band.

While serving in World War II, Armitage was a member of the band of the Buff Regiment, touring England for two years. In 1951, he moved to Zurich, Switzerland (where he lived for the rest of his life) and became a member of the Hazy Osterwald - Sextet. He toured with them internationally, gaining him and his group popularity. This lasted for fifteen years (1966) when he decided to work as a soloist, composer, and arranger, as well as working for various radio and television companies (such as the Schweizer Radio DRS). As a composer, Armitage created several compositions for brass bands. He later worked as a jazz pianist in the Lucerne Festival and held jazz events in Lucerne. Armitage also recorded an album with Ueli Staub.

It was in those television productions that, in 1983, he met Marc Reift (born 14 August 1955), a Swiss music teacher, composer, producer, conductor and publisher. After meeting Reift, Armitage published hundreds of arrangements and compositions with the "Editions Marc Reift".

However, Armitage's life was not restricted to music – he was also an artist under the pseudonym "Darmi". It is apparent that his works of art have a connection with his career in music.
