= Jakob Zellweger-Hünerwadel =

Swiss physician and politician

Jacob Zellweger
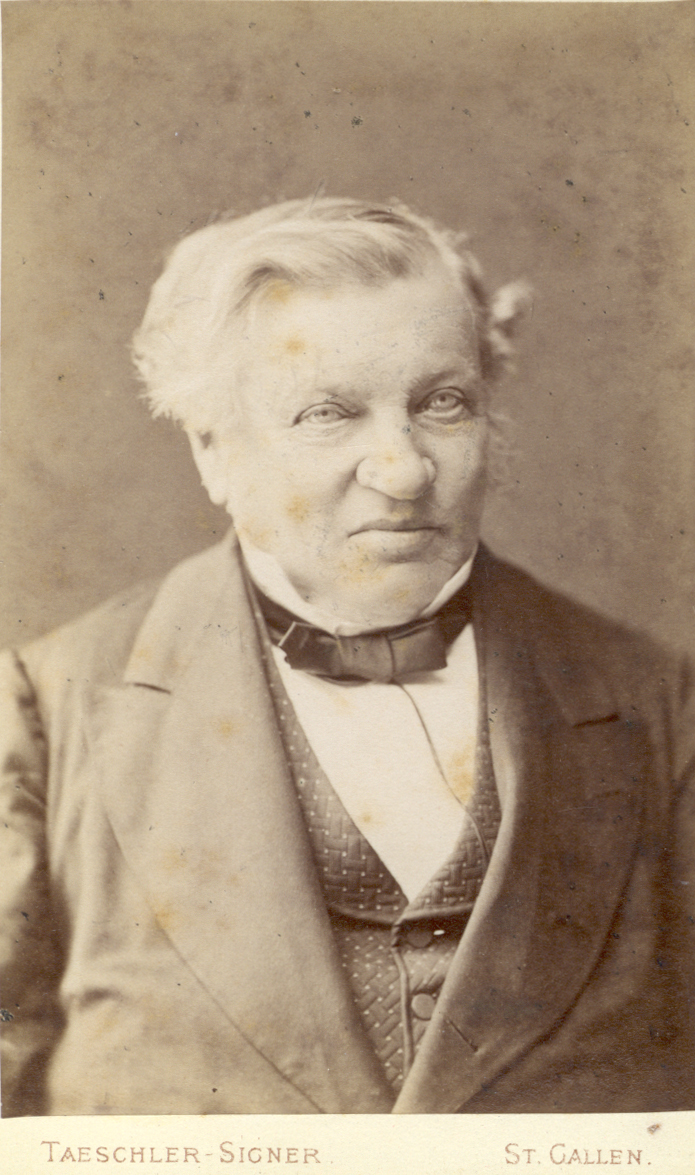

Tagsatzung delegate
- In office 1839–1848

Landammann of Appenzell Ausserrhoden
- In office 1839–1848

President of the Higher Court of Appenzell Ausserrhoden
- In office 1859–1872

Personal details
- Born: 1 September 1805 Trogen, Appenzell Ausserrhoden, Switzerland
- Died: 12 July 1873 (aged 67) Trogen, Appenzell Ausserrhoden, Switzerland
- Spouse: Sophie Hünerwadel (m. 1834)
- Parent: Jacob Zellweger
- Relatives: Salomon Zellweger (brother); Ulrich Zellweger (brother)
- Profession: Physician, surgeon, ophthalmologist

Jacob Zellweger (1 September 1805 – 12 July 1873) was a Swiss physician and politician from Trogen in the Canton of Appenzell Ausserrhoden. He served as Landammann of Appenzell Ausserrhoden from 1839 to 1848 and represented the canton at the Tagsatzung. A prominent surgeon and ophthalmologist, he ran a private hospital in Trogen and held various judicial and political offices throughout his career.

== Early life and education ==
Jacob Zellweger was born on 1 September 1805 in Trogen, the son of Jacob Zellweger and brother of Salomon and Ulrich Zellweger. He belonged to the Reformed Church. From 1817, he attended school in Zürich, where he later studied medicine. He continued his medical studies at the University of Heidelberg and received his doctorate in medicine in 1826. He pursued further training in Paris, Liège, Ghent, and Munich.

== Medical career ==
In 1827, Zellweger established a medical practice in Trogen, where he became particularly known as a surgeon and ophthalmologist. He operated a private hospital in the town. In 1827, he co-founded the Society of Appenzell Physicians (Gesellschaft appenzellischen Ärzte) and was a member of various philanthropic societies.

== Political career ==
Zellweger's political career began in 1829 when he became a councillor (Ratsherr) in Trogen, serving until 1832. From 1832 to 1833, he held the position of municipal captain (Gemeindehauptmann). Concurrently, he served as cantonal examining judge (kantonaler Verhörrichter) from 1829 to 1833. In 1833, he was appointed deputy governor (Landesstatthalter) of Appenzell Ausserrhoden, a position he held until 1839.

From 1839 to 1848, Zellweger served as Landammann of Appenzell Ausserrhoden and as the canton's delegate to the Tagsatzung, the legislative and executive council of the Old Swiss Confederacy. As a liberal-conservative, he opposed the 1848 Swiss Federal Constitution. After leaving the office of Landammann, he continued to serve in the cantonal judiciary. In 1858, he became clerk (Aktuar) of the Revision Council, and from 1859 to 1872, he served as president of the Higher Court (Obergerichtspräsident) of Appenzell Ausserrhoden.

Throughout his political career, Zellweger was a patron of the cantonal school in Appenzell Ausserrhoden.

== Personal life ==
In 1834, Zellweger married Sophie Hünerwadel, daughter of Marx Rudolf Hünerwadel, who owned an Indienne factory and served as a cantonal councillor. Jacob Zellweger died on 12 July 1873 in Trogen.
