= Raphael Minder =

Journalist (b. 1971)

Raphael Minder (born 1971 in Geneva) is a Swiss journalist and writer. He is the Central Europe Correspondent for The Financial Times, after covering Spain and Portugal for The New York Times for over a decade until May 2022.

Prior to this, he worked for a decade at The Financial Times as staff correspondent in Paris, Brussels and Sydney, as well as in Hong Kong as its Asia regional correspondent. Minder started his career as a journalist with Bloomberg News in 1993.

Minder is the author of The Struggle for Catalonia: Rebel Politics in Spain (Hurst), "an insightful and timely account of the fault lines in Spanish politics," which was published in September 2017, just as Spain's territorial crisis boiled over. An adaption of the book, Catalogne : Urnes et déchirures (Éditions Nevicata), was published in French in 2019.

In 2020, Minder wrote ¿Esto es España? Una década de corresponsalía (Ediciones Península), an account of his decade in Spain that was published by one of the publishing houses of Planeta Group, the world's largest Spanish-language book publisher.

The book was published in 2021 in English as Feeling the Heat: A Decade as a Foreign Correspondent in Spain (Sussex Academic Press). In his preface to Minder's book, the historian Sir Paul Preston wrote: “This is a highly recommendable portrait of a nation facing its greatest period of political upheaval since the death of Franco and the transition to democracy. Minder rightly expresses pride in being part of the Fourth Estate. This book justifies the conclusion at which I arrived in my book about foreign correspondents during the Spanish Civil War, We Saw Spain Die: good journalism can be the first draft of history.”

Minder holds dual Swiss and Hungarian citizenship. He is the great-grandson of Joseph Szigeti, a Hungarian violin virtuoso, and the grandson of Nikita Magaloff, a Russian-born concert pianist.

== Education ==
Raphael Minder studied at Harrow School, where he won an academic scholarship. He graduated in 1992 with a degree in politics, philosophy and economics from The Queen's College, University of Oxford. In 2002, he was awarded a Knight-Bagehot Fellowship from the Columbia University Graduate School of Journalism, where he obtained a Master's in Journalism. In 2018, he completed the IESE Business School Executive Program for Leadership Development and received a Logan Nonfiction Fellowship at the Carey Institute for Global Good.

== Bibliography ==
- The Struggle for Catalonia: Rebel Politics in Spain (Hurst, 2017) ISBN 978-1-84-904937-5
- Catalogne : Urnes et déchirures (Éditions Nevicata, 2019) ISBN 978-2-87-523134-5
- ¿Esto es España?: Una década de corresponsalía (Ediciones Península, 2020) ISBN 978-8-49-942942-7
- Feeling the Heat: A Decade as a Foreign Correspondent in Spain (Sussex Academic Press, 2021) ISBN 978-1-78976-149-8

Article archive at The New York Times
