= Hans Ulrich Staeps =

Hans Ulrich Staeps (1909–1988) was a German composer, music professor and professional recorder player. Staeps was born in Dortmund and was a professor at the Vienna Conservatory from 1940–1975. He was a prolific composer of recorder works, writing over 20 pieces for the instrument in a period of 30 years. Many of these compositions are works for recorder ensembles from 2 to 6 recorders, sometimes with piano, cembalo or guitar accompaniment. He also wrote songs, made transcriptions of classical works for recorder and wrote didactic books on player the recorder amongst others . Staeps was known to improvise his piano accompaniments, which often feature complex harmonies, with great ease.

== List of works ==
- Aradische Stenz, recorders (5)
- Aus unserm Hof daheim, recorders (3)
- Berliner Sonate, recorders (3)
- Chorische Quintett, recorders (5)
- Divertimento, recorders (2)
- Divertimento, recorders (2), piano, percussion
- Dort nied'n in jenem Holze, recorders (4)
- Einhorns Anmut, recorders (4)
- Elemente des Zusammenspiels, recorders (4)
- Fantasia con Echo, recorder, piano
- Flötentänze, recorders (4)
- Lied tönt fort, recorders (3)
- Quintet, recorders (5)
- Reihe kleiner Duette, recorders (2)
- Sonata im alten Stil, recorder, piano
- Sonata in modo preclassico, recorder, piano
- Suite in A, recorders (3)
- Triludi, recorders (3)
