= Helvetia Insurance =

International insurance group

Helvetia Holding AG

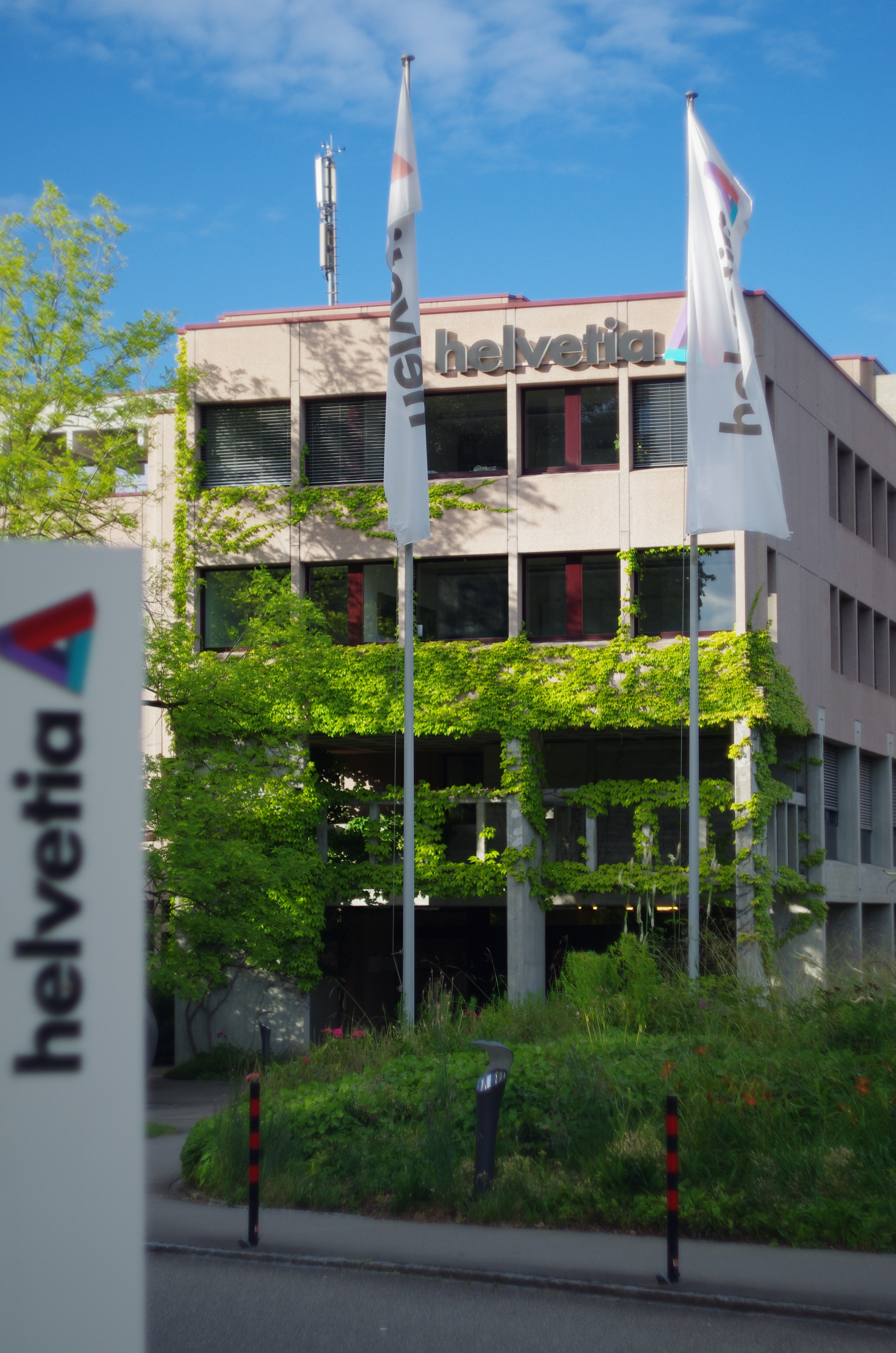
- Type: Aktiengesellschaft
- Traded as: SIX: HELN
- ISIN: CH0012271687
- Industry: Insurance
- Founded: 1858
- Headquarters: St. Gallen, Switzerland
- Key people: Fabian Rupprecht (CEO); Thomas Schmuckli (President of the Board of Directors)
- Revenue: CHF 11.552 bn (2024) (business volume)
- Number of employees: 14,442(2024)
- Website: www.helvetia.com

Helvetia is an international insurance group that has existed since 1858. The group of companies has been organised in a holding structure since 1996. The head office of Helvetia Group is located in St. Gallen, Switzerland.

== Corporate structure ==
The insurance group Helvetia employs about 14,442 employees across the world, a third of whom are based in Switzerland, and operates in Switzerland, Germany, Austria, Italy, France and Spain as well as in Latin America and Asia. Globally, the company works as a special and re-insurer. The parent company of Helvetia Group is Helvetia Holding AG, whose registered shares are listed on the SIX Swiss Exchange. The biggest shareholder of the insurance group is Patria mutual with a stake of 34.1 per cent. Helvetia generated a business volume of around CHF 11.552 billion in 2024.

== Financial results of Helvetia Holding ==
Financial year	Business volume (in CHF million)	Period result (IFRS after taxes, in CHF million)	Result per share (in CHF)
2024	11 552	502	9.0
2023	11 311	301	5.2
2022	11 097	614	10,6
2021	11 222	520	9,2
2020	9,714	282	4,8
2019	9,454	538	10,5(Share split 1:5)
2018	9,073	431	41.9
2017	8,641	403	40.5
2016	8,513	377	36.1
2015	8,235	309	29.0
2014	7,767	393	43.0
2013	7,477	363	40.9
2012	6,978	333	37.1
2011	7,172	289	32.6
2010	6755	342	39.3

source: Annual financial statements from 2010 to 2022 of Helvetia Group

== History ==
=== Founding of the predecessors from 1858 ===
In 1858, Helvetia was established by Eastern Swiss business people and entrepreneurs as Allgemeine Versicherungs-Gesellschaft Helvetia in St. Gallen. It was the first company in Switzerland to offer an insurance against risks of transport by land, river, and sea. Three years later, the private insurance company Helvetia Feuer was established in St Gallen. The occasion was the fire of Glarus, which revealed shortcomings in the building insurance system. Until 1887, both companies were jointly managed. The independent cooperative Helvetia Unfall was founded in 1894.

=== Expansion from 1862 ===
Over the course of its history, Helvetia expanded into all five continents and thereby laid the foundation for its business activities outside of Switzerland. In 1862, Helvetia Feuer established its first branches in Germany and expanded from 1876 into the US, where it opened branches in California and New York. Between 1920 and 1962, additional Helvetia subsidiaries were set up in France, Italy, Greece (sold in 1997), the Netherlands (sold in 1995) and Canada (sold in 1999). In Austria, the history of Helvetia goes back to the establishment of Der Anker, Gesellschaft von Lebens- und Rentenversicherung in 1858. Until 2006, Helvetia Austria also operated under this name. The establishment of subsidiaries in Spain, Italy and Germany took place between 1986 and 1988.

=== Corporate consolidation in the second half of the 20th century ===
In the years after 1945, the goal of all major Swiss insurers was to become an all-sector company. In this context, Helvetia Transport became a subsidiary of Helvetia Feuer in 1961, and the merger followed in 1974. In 1968, Helvetia Unfall and Helvetia Leben merged and the insurance group has been offering the entire product range of life and non-life insurance since then.

In this constellation, it was not possible for Helvetia Feuer to enter the field of accident liability and automotive insurance, as this was operated by Helvetia Unfall. The same applied in reverse for Helvetia Unfall with its subsidiary Helvetia Leben. Helvetia Feuer and Helvetia Unfall hindered each other "with their common name and saw their freedom of movement restricted in view of the transition to an all-sector society". An agreement between Helvetia Feuer and Helvetia Unfall followed. Closer cooperation was sought, but the independence of both partner companies was preserved. As a result, Helvetia Feuer cooperated with Helvetia Unfall between 1968 and 1988 by creating dual shares.

In 1986, Helvetia Feuer and Helvetia Unfall started to separate from their partnership. On 11 October 1988, the shareholders decided in an extraordinary general meeting of Helvetia Feuer and Helvetia Unfall to completely separate the two partner companies. Helvetia Feuer was renamed as Helvetia Versicherungen and the company received a new mission statement and branding. The three-dimensional triangular symbol was introduced. Helvetia Unfall took the name of its travel insurance subsidiary Elvia (now part of Allianz Global Assistance). One year later, Helvetia Insurance in Switzerland branched out to include the accident, liability and motor vehicle sectors.

=== Helvetia and Patria ===
In 1991, Erich Walser was appointed as general director of the group. Among other things, he was hired to implement a new strategy that enabled the development from a non-life insurer to an all-line insurance group. In 1996, the company cooperated with the long-standing Basel-based life insurer Patria. The beginnings of Patria go back to the establishment of Basler Sterbe- und Alters-Kasse in 1878. The charitable pension fund was the first to insure the life of socially disadvantaged people with the aim of being an actual national insurer. After numerous changes in name and mergers, Schweizerische Lebensversicherungsgesellschaft Patria was established in 1910. In 1992, Helvetia and Patria decided to develop the Swiss market jointly in the future and enter into a strategic alliance; joint management began in 1994. In June 1996, the companies have been merged and established as Helvetia Patria.

=== Market consolidation in the 1990s ===
The aim of the new company structure established in 1996 was to strengthen the market positions in the core countries of Switzerland, Germany and Austria as well as in the two southern European markets of Italy and Spain. Alte Leipziger, for example, took a 10% stake in Helvetia Patria's share capital. Through its cooperation with Alte Leipziger, Helvetia Patria transacted business in the areas of health insurance, legal protection insurance and building society savings with companies in the Alte Leipziger Group in Germany. In 2001, Alte Leipziger sold its shares again. As a result, the Swiss Association of Raiffeisenbanken became a new shareholder in the Helvetia Patria Group with a two percent share. The cooperation with the Raiffeisen group was subsequently expanded.

In Austria, Der Anker, Gesellschaft von Lebens- und Rentenversicherung became a wholly owned subsidiary in 1993. In Italy, Helvetia Patria took over Nordstern Danni in 1998 and acquired Norwich Union Vita in 2001. In 2005, the group bought the insurance portfolio of Sofid Vita and three years later they acquired Padana Assicurazioni and the majority of Chiara Vita. In Spain, at the end of 1998, Helvetia Patria acquired the northern Spanish La Vasco Navarra LVN, a medium-sized all-sector company. In 2000, the takeover of Previsión Española was completed. In 2003, the two companies merged into Helvetia Previsión, based in Seville. The position in the transport insurance area was expanded through the purchase of the transport insurance area of the cooperation partner Royal & Sun Alliance in 2002 and further acquisitions. Helvetia Patria withdrew completely from the Netherlands, Greece and Canada by 2000.

=== Acquisition, internationalization and diversification ===
Since 2006, the corporate group has appeared under the Helvetia brand in all countries. In 2010, Helvetia bought the Swiss insurers Alba Allgemeine Versicherungs-Gesellschaft AG (Alba) and Phenix Lebensversicherungsgesellschaft AG (Phenix). The Alba/Phenix range in sickness/accident insurance was sold to the two insurance companies Innova and Solida.

In 2014, Nationale Suisse and Austria's subsidiary of Bâloise were taken over. For this acquisition, Helvetia increased its stake in Nationale Suisse to more than 98 per cent and then initiated the procedure to declare the remaining shares void. Nationale Suisse consisted of smile.direct, Switzerland's leading online insurer. It also became part of Helvetia Group with the takeover. The acquisition was one of the biggest insurance takeover in recent years in Switzerland.

In 2016, Helvetia took over 70 per cent of the shares in the online mortgage broker MoneyPark. The purchase price was about 107 million francs. With this majority stake, Helvetia entered the Swiss mortgage business.

At the beginning of 2017, the company announced that it would invest in startups, which support the transformation of the existing core business or develop new business models, via their own venture fund. The fund is endowed with some CHF 55 million and plans to invest in some 25 new companies. Among other things, the venture fund has invested in Volocopter, Flatfox, Pricehubble, Baufi24.de or in the Insurtech Inzmo.

=== Recent developments ===
With the takeover of Caser in 2020, the group entered the health & care sector, as Caser operated six hospitals and around 24 dental clinics as well as retirement and nursing homes in addition to the insurance business. In the same year, the company founded Helvetia Asset Management AG, through which it sold services and investments in the real estate sector. The company's first real estate fund was set up in April 2020. Further capital increases followed, as a result of which the fund had 47 properties with a market value of around CHF 1.09 billion as of 1 April 2023.

In 2022, Helvetia Group entered into a partnership with Migros Bank for the sale of car insurance. Via the subsidiary Medicall AG, Helvetia Group coordinates the evacuation of accidents and the towing of the Canton Basel-Landschaft. Since March 2022, Helvetia Liechtenstein has been operating under the name Helvetia Global Solutions (HGS). At the end of 2022, Helvetia Group started the internationalization of the online insurer Smile and introduced it to the Austrian market, followed by the introduction to the Spanish market in 2023.

=== Merger ===
In April 2025, Helvetia and Baloise announced a plan to merge to create Switzerland's second-largest insurance group with a combined business volume of 20 billion Swiss francs ($24.69 billion). The new group would be called Helvetia Baloise Holding. The merger is expected to conclude in the fourth quarter of 2025.

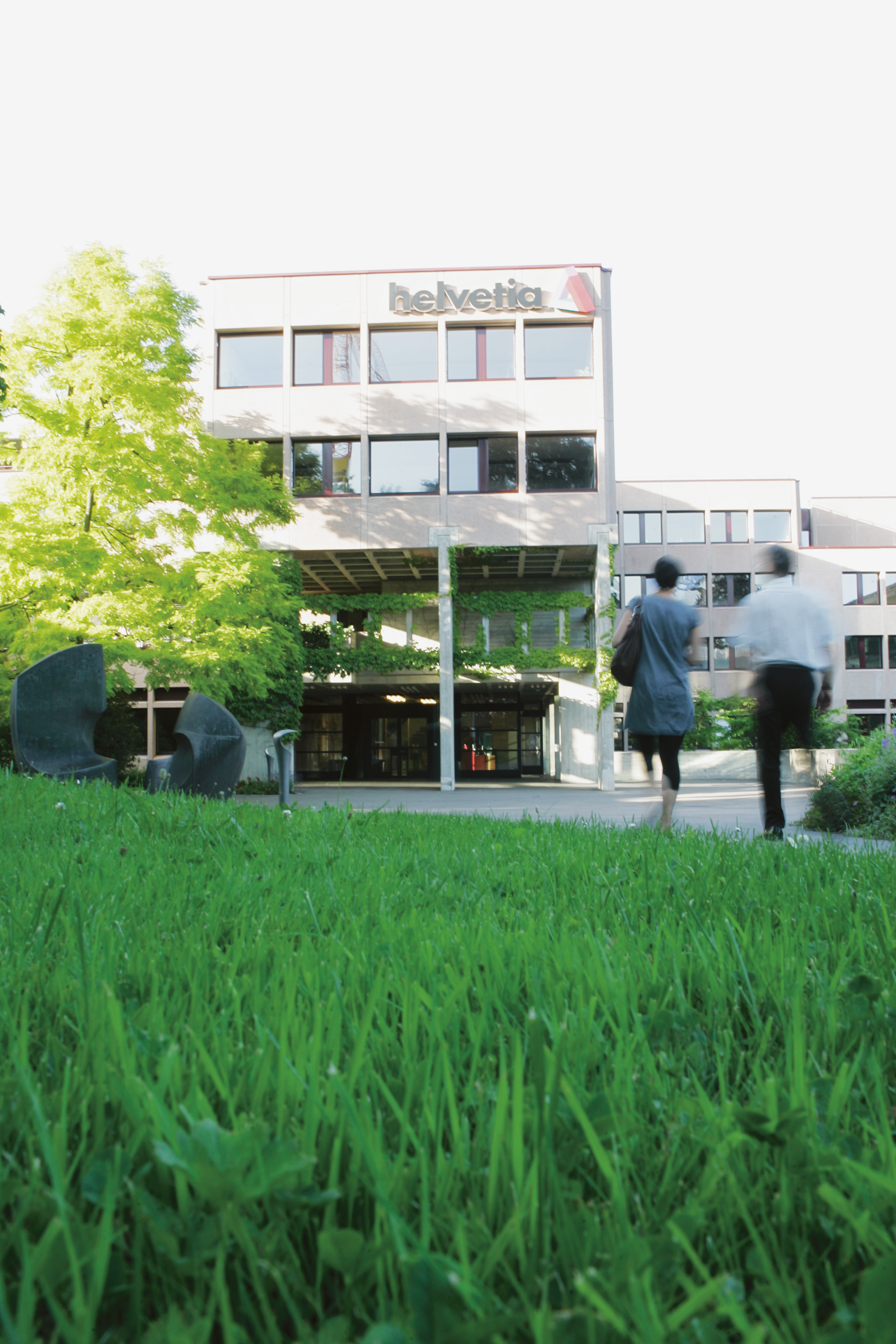
Head office of Helvetia Group on the Girtannersberg, St. Gallen in 2012.

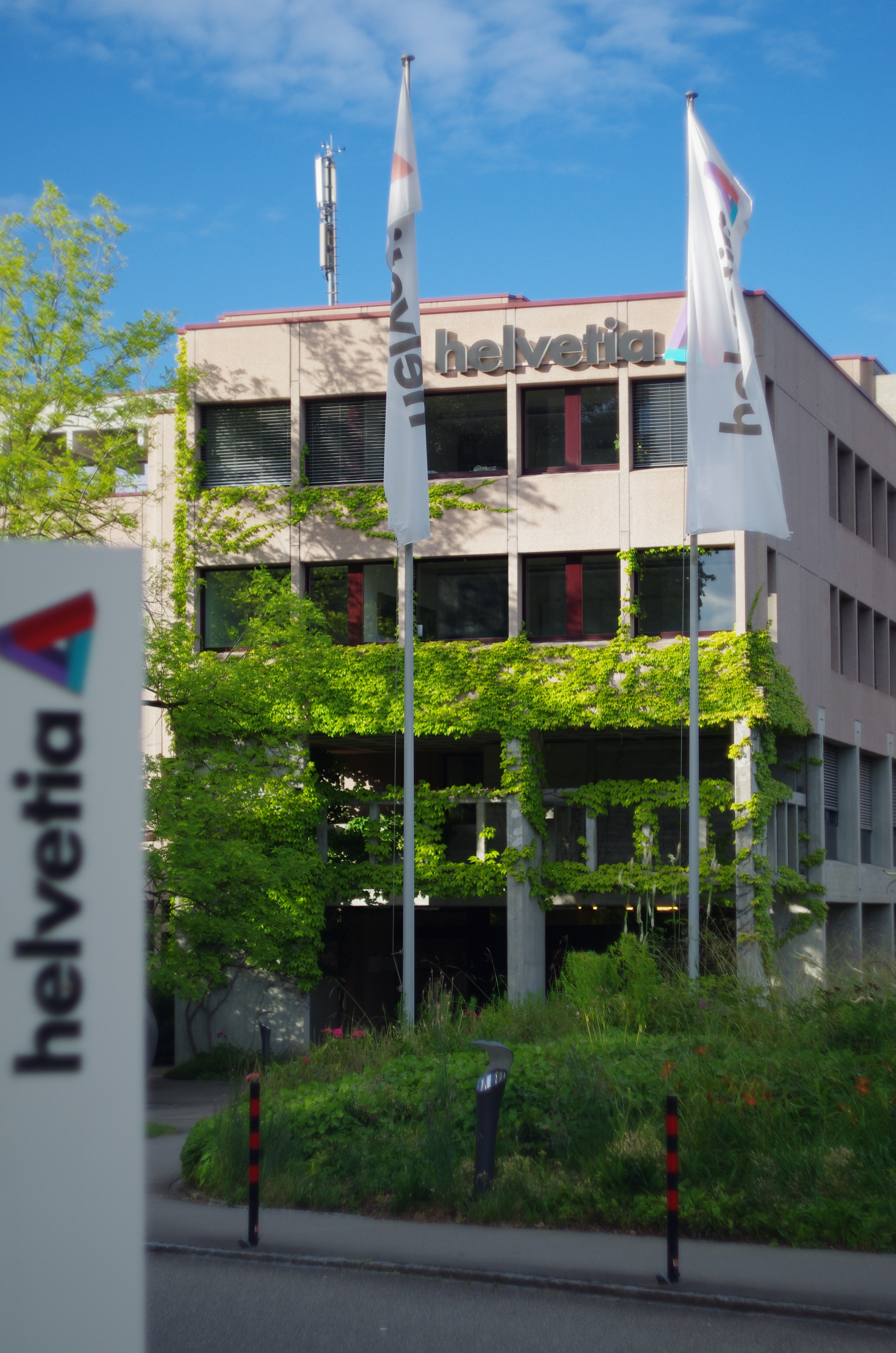
Head office of Helvetia Group in St. Gallen in 2013.

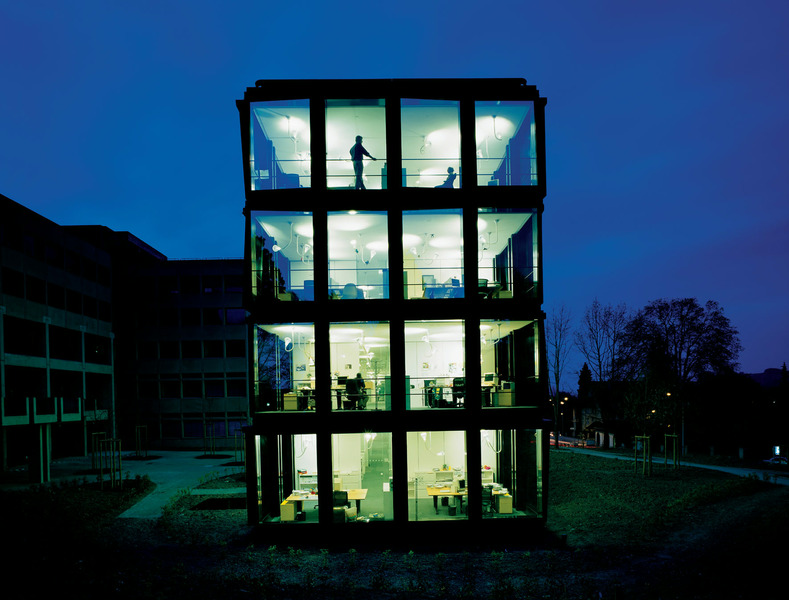
Building the extension for Helvetia Group on the Girtannersberg, St. Gallen in 2012.

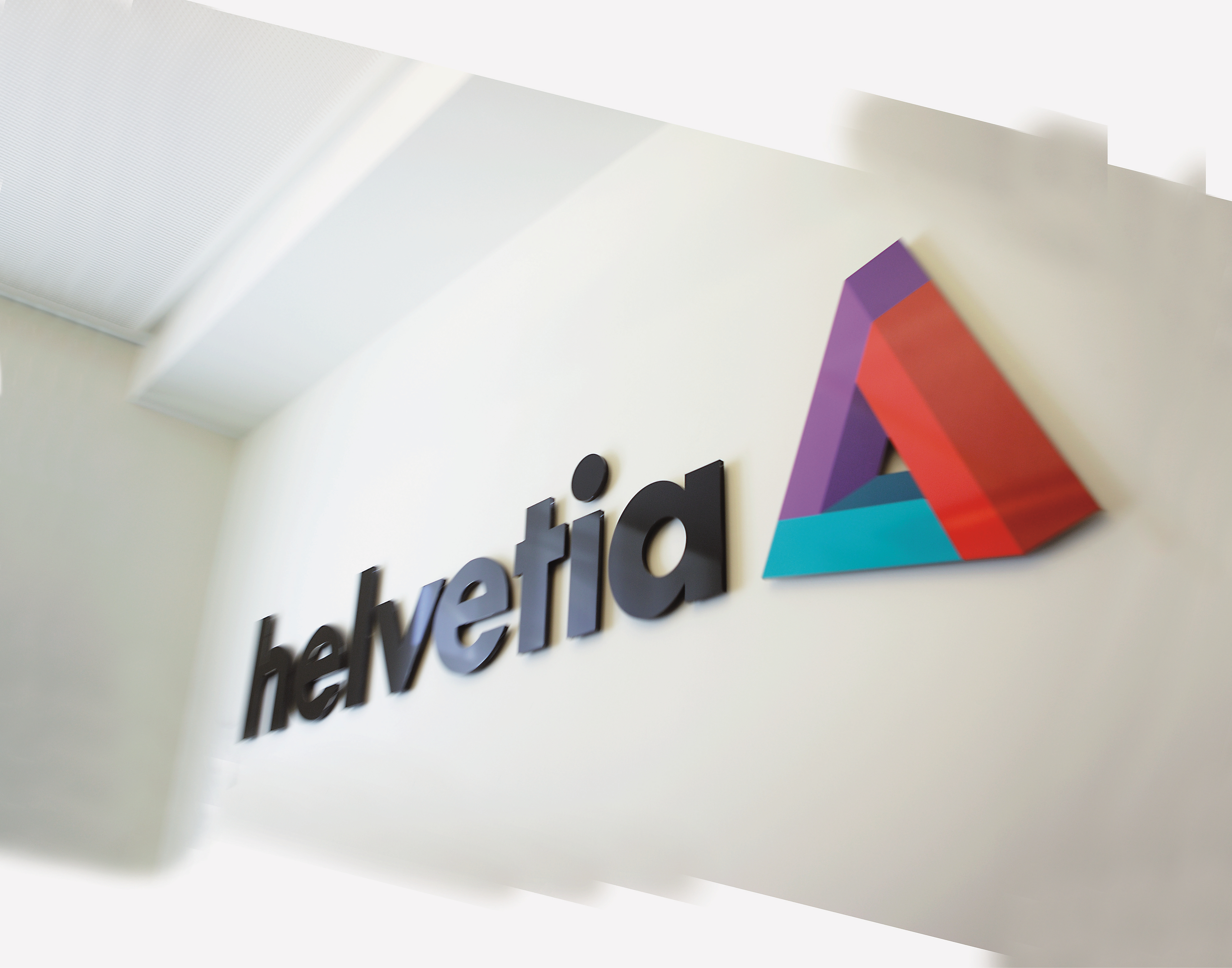
Helvetia has been operating under a uniform image throughout Europe since September 2006.

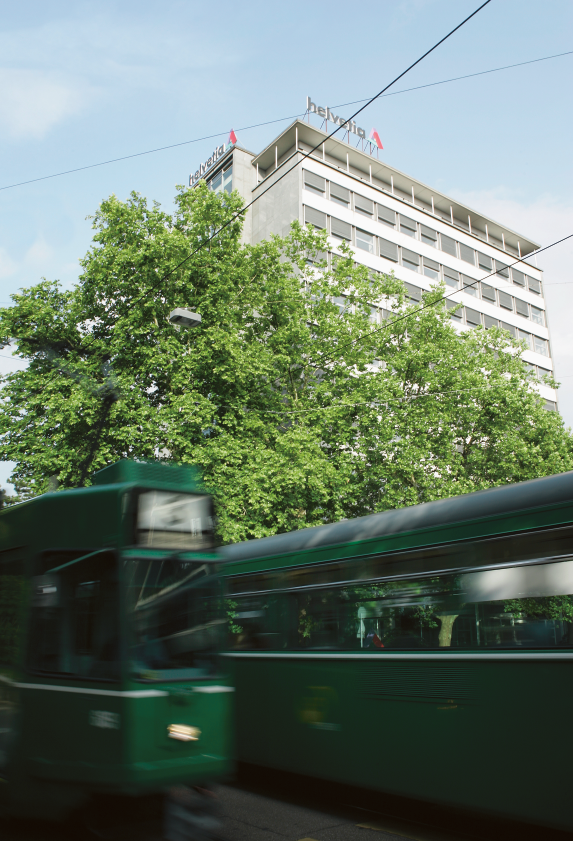
Head office of Helvetia Switzerland in Basel in 2012.

== Group Executive Board and Board of Directors ==
Helvetia is managed by an executive board of nine people. Fabian Rupprecht had been its chairman since 1 October 2023.

The board of directors has ten members and Thomas Schmuckli was elected as chairman at the General Assembly in April 2022.

== International activities ==
The group is divided into three segments, in which the European and Swiss segments together make up 80 per cent of the business volume.

Segments (with business volume 2022)
Switzerland (42%)	Europe (40%)	Specialty Markets (18%)

source: Annual report of Helvetia Group

In Switzerland, the insurance group is an all-lines insurer. In the countries of Austria, Germany, Italy, and Spain, which are summarised in the Europe segment, Helvetia is organised in national companies. Here, as in Switzerland, the insurer focuses on the business with private customers and small and medium-sized companies. Helvetia offers all key life and non-life products in these countries. 32 per cent of the total business volume originates from the Europe segment. In the non-life area, this figure is 42 per cent.

In the Specialty Markets segment, Helvetia offers insurance for art, engineering and transport, as well as active reinsurance worldwide. To this end, Helvetia has branches in Miami for the Latin American and in Singapore for the Asian markets. The French subsidiary also offers transport and art insurances. In addition, Helvetia organizes parts of its investment and financing activities via subsidiaries and investment companies in Luxembourg.

=== Subsidiaries ===
The main subsidiaries of Helvetia Holding include: Caser (Spanish insurer, operator of hospitals, dental clinics and retirement and nursing homes); Helvetia Schweizerische Versicherungsgesellschaft AG, St. Gallen (Helvetia Insurance); Helvetia Schweizerische Lebensversicherungsgesellschaft AG, Basel (Helvetia Life); Helvetia Global Solutions (HGS for short, active in the non-life business, offers special and reinsurance covers in the areas of industrial property, engineering, space, aviation, marine and art and insures risks in B2B2C business and international automotive business throughout Europe); Smile (online insurance in Switzerland and Austria) and Europäische Reiseversicherung (ERV) are managed as branches. In addition, the group generates income from the service business in the real estate sector via Helvetia Asset Management AG. The Swiss Property Fund, a Swiss real estate fund, is managed for this purpose. The mandate for managing the properties of this fund lies with Helvetia Asset Management AG as a group company. The fund is a third-party fund that does not belong to Helvetia Group.

== Sponsoring and commitment ==
As a sponsor, Helvetia Group supports selected projects and teams in the areas of sport and culture in all sales countries as well as initiatives in the area of sustainable business.

=== Sports ===
Since the 2005/06 season, Helvetia has been an association sponsor of Swiss-Ski, the Swiss ski association and umbrella organisation of Swiss snow sports. It supports some 300 athletes from eleven disciplines. Between 2016 and 2020, Helvetia has also been Presenting Partner of the Swiss Football Cup. Helvetia also supports projects in neighbouring European countries, such as the Cross-Country Skiing World Cup.

=== Art and art award ===
Helvetia has an art collection of more than 400 contemporary Swiss artists, which includes 2000 works of art. At the Helvetia Art Foyer in Basel, works from the collection are exhibited and artists invited to provide individual exhibitions. Furthermore, the Helvetia Art Award has been bestowed annually since 2004; it is awarded to graduates of a Swiss arts college. The award provides the opportunity to exhibit at the LISTE Art Fair Basel and prize money of 15,000 francs.

== Sustainability ==
Helvetia is committed to the creation of protection forests and supports the Alpine Protection Forest Award as the main sponsor since 2014. Helvetia is a member of the ceo4climate initiative – an energy and climate policy campaign by Swiss business associations. In April 2021, Helvetia also joined the Task Force on Climate-related Financial Disclosures (TCFD), which promotes international transparency on climate-related risks and opportunities. In addition, the group invests in climate-friendly bonds and projects such as Cargo sous terrain.

== See also ==
- Salomon Zellweger
