= Hans-Ulrich Brunner =

Swiss painter

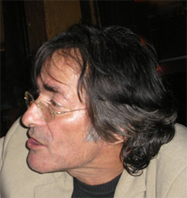
Hans-Ulrich Brunner

Hans-Ulrich Brunner (1943–2006, Winterthur, Switzerland) was a Swiss painter and visual artist. He studied ethnology and art history at the University of Bern beginning in 1964. In 1968, he continued his studies at La Grande Chaumière in Paris and later in Madrid. From 1969 to 1975, he studied at the State Academy of Fine Arts, where he became a master student of Professor Hermann Bachmann in 1974. From 1979 to 1985, Brunner taught at the Hochschule der Künste (HdK) in Berlin. He also undertook study trips to France, Italy, Spain, Greece, Tunisia, and other countries. Brunner lived and worked as a freelance artist in Berlin throughout his career.
