= Ueli Prager =

Swiss businessperson (1916–2011)

Ueli Prager (1916–2011) was a Swiss businessperson and founder of Mövenpick Hotels & Resorts and Mövenpick Ice Cream.

== Early life and education ==
Prager was raised in Wiesbaden, Germany. He studied economics at Zurich University and had early roles at London's Savoy and Mayfair hotels.

== Career ==
In 1948, he established a restaurant in Zürich, which led to the creation of Mövenpick Hotels & Resorts and Mövenpick Ice Cream, encompassing various food products and eateries.

Prager opened a hotel at Zurich Airport in the 1970s and expanded into other locations. The company faced challenges in the 1980s and eventually he was replaced by his third wife, Jutta, in 1988.

In 1992, Prager sold his shares in Mövenpick to August von Finck.

== Death ==
Prager died in 2011 at the age of 95.
