= Mövenpick Ice Cream =

Swiss brand of ice cream produced by Nestlé

Mövenpick
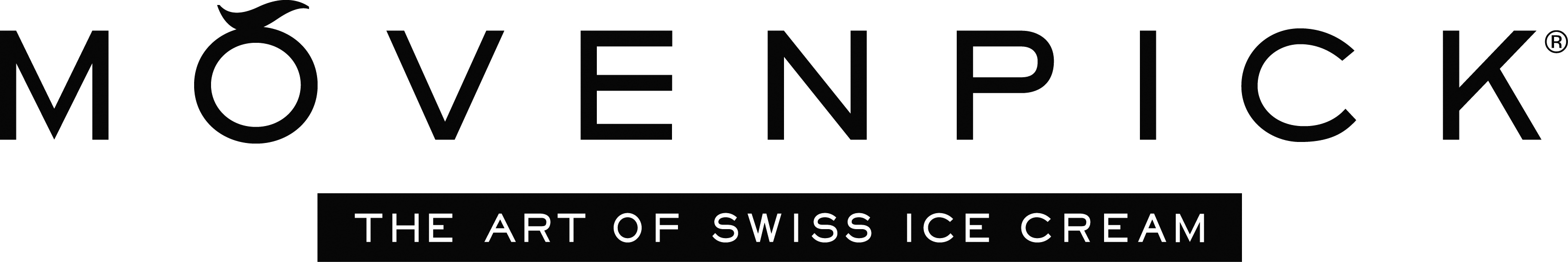
- Current owner: Nestlé/Froneri
- Country: Switzerland
- Introduced: 19 July 1948
- Markets: Worldwide
- Tagline: The Art of Swiss Icecream
- Website: movenpick-icecream.com

Mövenpick Ice Cream (German: [ˈmøːvənˌpɪk]) is a brand of ice cream of Swiss origin produced initially by Nestlé. Since 2016, Froneri - a joint venture between Nestlé and R&R Ice Cream - manufactures it.

== History ==
The first Mövenpick restaurant opened in Zürich on 19 July 1948 by Ueli Prager. By 1958, they had eight restaurants located throughout Switzerland. Prager would remain operating manager of the Mövenpick group, now called Mövenpick Hotels & Resorts, until 1991.

Originally, in the 1960s, the ice cream was produced by the Mövenpick group for restaurant sales only. The plant in Bursins was built in 1972, however, production has now been shifted to a larger unit in Rorschach.

In 1974, Mövenpick was licensed in Germany by ice cream manufacturer, Theo Schöller, later known as Scholler Lebensmittel GmbH & Co KG. In 2002, EU regulators reviewed, and later approved, Nestlé's purchase of the Scholler Holding Group from Sudzucker, including licensing to sell Mövenpick in some European countries. The decision was made because while the merger would strengthen Nestlé's positioning in the ice cream market, Unilever's role in the market would ensure continued strong competition in the sector.

In March 2000, Mövenpick acquired the Auckland-based Chateau Creme Delight Ice Cream company.

In 2002, Bauer was licensed to distribute and market Mövenpick in the United Kingdom.

In April 2003, Nestlé bought the international rights for Mövenpick ice cream from the hotel group, and an independent business unit called "Swiss Premium Ice Cream" was created. The buy-out contract did not include the New Zealand manufacturing facilities.

As of 2014, the business was operated by a subsidiary called "Nestlé Super Premium", headquartered in Vevey, Switzerland. In 2016, it was one of the brands that Nestlé contributed to a new joint venture with R&R Ice Cream, called Froneri.

== Production and distribution ==
The main production site is in Switzerland. Halal production for the Middle East takes place at the Nestlé factory in Egypt.

The company has partnered licensing agreements in Germany, Norway, Sweden, Finland, Egypt, and Saudi Arabia.

In February 2006, Nestlé Schöller announced a newly patented type of "conching" process. The conchier process uses temperature reduction and slow, constant two-wave stirring to develop microscopic ice crystals and bubbles as the ice cream freezes. Minimising the need for large ice crystals reduces the required fat content by 30 to 40%, so the process creates low-fat ice cream, but with a creamy consistency and intense taste. The process was used to reduce the fat content in Bourbon Vanilla, Chocolate Chips, Erdbeer (strawberry) Cream and Maple Walnuts flavors. Machinery at the Uelzen factory was upgraded at a cost of 5 to 6 million euros. In 2007, the conchier process was introduced to create "Decorative" category flavors with less than ten percent fat content: Cioccolata Straccietella, Caramel Brulee, Marzipan Chocolate and Chocolate Rum-Grape-Nut. This ice cream, in recent years, has shifted from sugar to glucose syrup in their ingredient list.

In July 2017, Emerald Foods (Australia) Pty Ltd. purchased the master franchise rights for the Mövenpick parlours in Australia from Peters Ice Cream. Peters continued as the Mövenpick distributor for other channels in Australia.

=== Contracted production ===
==== Canada ====
In the 1990s, Mövenpick-branded products were made at plants in Simcoe, Ontario. Production was managed by Beatrice Foods, whose ice cream division was bought in 1994 by Good Humor-Popsicle (a child company of Unilever).

In 2001, Delicious Alternative Desserts Ltd. (DAD) received the contract to co-pack Mövenpick products in Canada, in packaging customised to the region. DAD was placed in receivership in 2002. Bankruptcy trustee KPMG continued limited production of Mövenpick at Stoney Creek Dairy, which was purchased by Better Beef Ltd. in February 2002. Better Beef was sold to Cargill Inc. in 2005, and the dairy was purchased by Creme Glacee Lambert in 2009, and closed in 2010.

==== Egypt ====
In 2013, Nestlé upgraded their ice cream factory in Egypt, where Mövenpick ice creams are produced for export to Malaysia.

==== Germany ====
Nestlé produces Mövenpick ice cream in Germany, but sold part of its licensing and production facilities for trade brands to ice cream manufacturer Rosen Eiskrem GmbH of Waldfeucht-Haaren in January 2007. The co-packing agreement and sale included plants in Nurnberg and Prenzlau. Nestlé Schöller remained at their Nurnberg headquarters, and retained their Uelzen plant.

==== New Zealand ====
In September 1998, New Zealand-based Southern Fresh Milk Company received a $20 million 10-year contract from Mövenpick Asia-Pacific to produce and supply Mövenpick-branded ice cream to Asia and Australia. Southern Fresh was to create 11 ice cream flavors and 640,000 litres of ice cream annually. The contract did not include production or distribution of the desserts within New Zealand, as the importation and distribution contract was already allocated to Tip Top Foods, which was intended to span 1988 to 2006. When the contract was awarded to Southern Fresh, Tip Top published an advertisement to clarify that they continued to hold the New Zealand market contract.

The Southern Fresh contract was later expanded to a revised $60 million, increasing to 16 flavors and 2.25 million litres of ice cream each year. The extra funds allowed for the expansion of a manufacturing plant with a dedicated Mövenpick production area. Southern Fresh's contract allowed for sending the ice cream to Australia, Japan, and Singapore. Initial plans were to later export to South Korea, China, and Hong Kong. One of the ice cream flavors produced for the Japanese market was Green Tea in 100ml containers.

Southern Fresh purchased an additional factory in East Tamaki, Auckland, in April 2000, which raised concerns that production work would be taken from the Invercargill factory.

On 23 December 2000, 20 of the Southern Fresh workers at the Ettrick Street, Invercargill, factory received notice that their employee contracts would not be renewed. The contractors were temporarily employed to produce Mövenpick ice cream. One of the workers speculated in a Southland Times article that the redundancies were linked to quality control. Southern Fresh executives countered that the job changes were a result of technical problems at the factory and market fluctuations. They later stated that the problem was more about "presentation", despite Mövenpick itself supplying the packaging to the factory.

The 2001 opening of the Auckland plant overrode the existing Tip Top Foods contract with Mövenpick.

In April 2001, prior to Mövenpick's acquisition by Nestlé, executive Chris White moved from his Mövenpick Asia-Pacific chief executive role to a position at Nestlé. White had previously assured staff at the Mövenpick Invercargill factory that the Southern Fresh contract would not be impacted by a new Auckland factory.

In April 2001, newspaper articles stated that Mövenpick ceased buying ice cream from Southern Fresh for the Japanese market, but the orders had ceased since November 2000. A Mövenpick executive stated that the companies were "...working through issues...". A Mövenpick executive stated that there were quality problems, but a Southern Fresh executive disputed this, noting the Japanese recession and that Southern Fresh were being used as a scapegoat for Mövenpick's marketing difficulties in Japan. That same month, Southern Fresh dismissed 20 employees from the Invercargill factory as a result of the withdrawn Mövenpick orders. That same month, Southern Fresh stated in the media that they were owed millions of dollars by Mövenpick. There were arbitration meetings between Mövenpick and Southern Fresh in August 2001, which acknowledged that their contract lapsed in November 2000. In September 2001, Mövenpick stated that all issues between the parties had been resolved. In February 2002, Southern Fresh chief executive Alasdair McLachlan described the Mövenpick deal as "disastrous", identifying it as "Mövenpick's [contract] failure is what killed us.", in being the main contributing factor for Southern Fresh's significant loan, and later buyout, by dairy company Mainland. Mainland closed the Invercargill factory in July 2002.

At the time of the 2003 acquisition of Mövenpick by Nestlé, Chateau Creme Delight Ice Cream company continued to produce Mövenpick ice creams under license. The New Zealand rights were not included in the Nestlé contract, and Nestlé did not have their own production facilities in the country. Mövenpick retained the Chateau rights because it wanted to increase its presence in the Asia Pacific region. In October 2003, International Dairy Ventures (IDV) purchased the New Zealand operations of Chateau, including the Nestlé-licensed Mövenpick productions and the Mövenpick store in Mission Bay, Auckland.

Mövenpick products were later made by Emerald Foods, a company owned by Mövenpick until December 2003, when it was sold to the Emerald Group. In December 2005, Emerald Group CEO Diane Foreman noted a supply challenge, in that Emerald was contractually obliged to buy all raw materials from Swiss-based Mövenpick, to make licensed Mövenpick products. In late 2009, Emerald signed a contract with Mövenpick for a further four years.

The ice cream making subsidiary of the Emerald Group was then sold to Emerald Foods Group (HK) in April 2015.

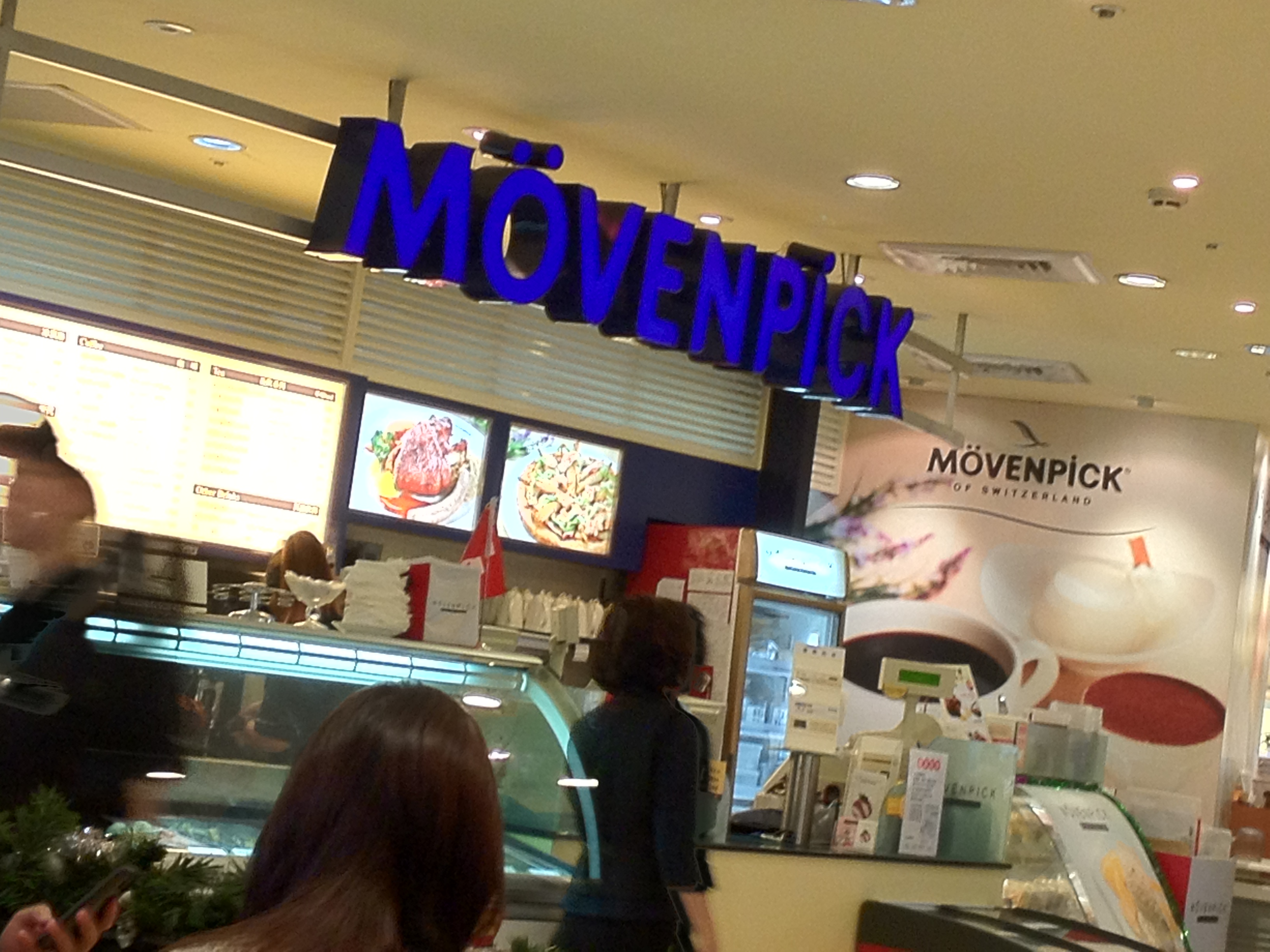
Mövenpick "Boutique" in Taiwan

==== Pakistan ====
In the 1990s, Ambrosia International Limited (Pvt) (AIL) began a licensing agreement with Mövenpick to produce their branded ice creams in Pakistan. The JOFA Group has been the exclusive franchiser for the brand since 2002.

==== Saudi Arabia ====
From the late 1980s until 2009, SADAFCO produced Mövenpick-branded products at plants in Jeddah, Riyadh, Dammam, and Madinah. However, starting in 2011, Mohammed Khaled Alkhulaidi Trading Establishment ("MKKTE") became the exclusive franchiser of the brand in Saudi Arabia, importing Mövenpick ice cream products and distributing them to hotels and through different points of sale across the kingdom.

==== Sweden ====
In 2011, Swedish ice cream manufacturer Triumf Glass introduced Mövenpick Classic flavors to the Swedish market in 900ml packaging. Flavors included Almond & Vanilla, Caramelita, Maple Walnut, Strawberry, Swiss Chocolate, and Vanilla Dream.

==== United States ====
Mövenpick-branded ice cream was first produced in America in the late 1980s by Sunnyside Farms Dairy at a plant in Turlock, California.

=== Ice creams and sorbets ===
Year	New flavor/s launched	Notes
1994	Creamy Plum; Gingerbread	
1996	Piña Colada; Coffee n' Cream; Pecan Nut Kick (Scotch whiskey); Grapefruit Fizz	Flavors as part of the Mövenpick Specials range of alcoholic 500g tubs.
2001	Peach & Wild Strawberry; Apple Blackberry; Banana & Passionfruit	Flavors as part of the Summer Limited Edition, in one litre packs.
2001	Gianduja chocolate; White Chocolate; Vanilla Brownie	Limited edition flavors.
2003	Chocolate Cherry; Chocolate Nougat; Chocolate Truffle	The Chocolate Truffle flavor won the export category in the 2003 New Zealand Ice Cream Awards.
2004	Gingerbread; Jamaica (rum and raisin)	Part of the Winter limited edition in Finland.
October 2004	Marzipan Chocolate; Rum Grape Nut	Retail Mövenpick flavors were reclassified into categories of Classical, Fruity and Decorative.: Classical category included the new flavor of Marzipan Chocolate, and existing flavors of Bourbon Vanilla and Chocolate Chip.; Fruity category included Strawberry and Lemon Sorbet.; Decorative category included the new flavor of Rum Grape Nut and existing flavors of Vanilla Brownies and Caramel Brulee.
2005	Maracuja	A Maracuja flavor was introduced to Germany, it consisted of buttermilk ice cream with maracuja-peach ice and fruit pieces.
2006	Eis Creation des Sommers 2006	A strawberry ice cream with strawberry chunks and bitter chocolate.
2007	Creme Praline Marc de Champagne	A flavor released for Fall and Winter – unclear as to whether it was the "Winter ice cream of the year". The Marc de Champagne ingredient is the residue of grapes pressed to make champagne. It is mixed with chocolate ice cream, dark milk chocolate bars and chocolate almonds.
2007	Eis Creation des Sommers 2007: Madagascar Vanilla Papaya	A vanilla ice cream with papaya fruit ice, mango-passionfruit and almond splinters.
2007	Mandarin and Cranberry; Mirabelle Plum and Apricot; White Chocolate; Raspberry Sorbet	New flavors added to the All Natural range.
2008	Nougat Aux Prunes; Chocolate with Chili; Almendras Estilo Andaluz; Chocolate Picante; Pistache a la Marrakech	The Schatze Der Welt (Treasures of the World) line was introduced in Germany early in the year, and later in the year in Australia. The Nougat Aux Prunes flavor has white nougat ice cream with Armagnac plums and white chocolate pieces. The Almendras Estilo Andaluz is an orange and cinnamon flavor, the Chocolate Picante is a "Mexican-inspired" chocolate flavor, and Pistache a la Marrakech includes figs and cardamom.
2009	'VSOP Cognac' ice cream (Very Superior Old Pale Cognac); Ricotta and Pink Pepper	The cognac flavor won the 2009 Catering Product of the Year category in the British Frozen Food Federation awards. It also won the gold award for "Best New Dessert/Ice Cream/ Confectionery Product". The flavor has also been noted as "Cognac VSOP & Apple".
2010	Almond & Vanilla; Double Cream & Meringues	The Double Cream & Meringues flavor won Gold in the Best New Dessert/Ice Cream/Confectionery Product in the 2010 British Frozen Food Federation (BFFF) awards. The flavor had previously been introduced as part of the Limited Edition range in 2007, and was then named "Double Creme & Meringue" flavor. It was created in conjunction with a small dairy supplier in a village in Switzerland's Gruyere region. After selling out, it was permanently reinstated in the Classics range in 2009.
2010	Waldfrucht Joghurt	A creamy yogurt ice cream with "forest fruit" (blueberries, blackberries and raspberries) chunks and white chocolate rolls. The creamy, low-fat flavor was created with the new Conchier process.
2010	Vanilla Chocolate	A combination of Bourbon Vanilla ice cream, chocolate sauce and chocolate bits.
March 2011	Asian Black Leaf Lychee & Rose; Provence Lavender Honey & Violet; Yoghurt & Apricot; Apricot & Rosemary; Coconut & Lemongrass	In the Creation range, Asian Black Leaf Lychee & Rose flavor is lychee ice cream with fruit pieces, crystallised rose petals and rose ripple sauce. The Provence Lavender Honey & Violet flavor has lavender honey from Southern France, crystallised violet petals and orange blossom ripple sauce. The lavender flavor was only available from the Swiss store Manor. In the Harmony range, the Yoghurt & Apricot flavor has frozen Swiss yoghurt, Bergeron apricots, and fruit pieces. The 2011 Summer Limited edition flavors are based on the theme "Fruit and herbs" and include Apricot & Rosemary sorbet and Coconut and Lemongrass ice cream.
2011	Blackcurrant and Cream; Amaretto & almond	A similarly named 'Almond & amaretto' limited edition Winter flavor had been introduced in Finland in 2003.
March 2012	Fior di Latte; Apricot sorbet	The Fior di Latte flavor has 51% whole-milk ice cream. The Apricot sorbet flavor has 40% fruit content, with Bergeron apricot pieces from France.
April 2013	Banana Caramel	This flavor is the Ice creation of the Summer, and has banana ice cream with caramel pieces and caramel sauce.
2013	Macadamia Dulce de Leche	

"Ice cream of the year" voting

The annual "Ice cream of the year" was established in circa 1988. The "Winter ice cream of the year" or "Ice creations of the Winter" was established in 1995.

Year	Award	Flavor	Notes
1997	Ice cream of the year	Creme Apricot	Voted by customers at Mövenpick hotels and restaurants. The flavor was a blend of apricot yogurt ice cream and apricot sorbet.
1997	Winter ice cream of the year	Black Forest Cherry flavor	This flavor was later incorporated into the permanent menu.
1998	Ice cream of the year	Cream Pineapple	
2000	Ice cream of the year	Burnt Almond	
2002	Ice cream of the year	Mango Crème Fraîche	Mövenpick stated that it was the first time that crème fraîche was used as an ingredient in ice cream.
2002	Winter ice cream of the year	Birne Helene; Bacio de Cioccolata	The Birne Helene, a vanilla pear flavor, was announced as the 2002 Winter ice cream of the year in April. In December, Bacio de Cioccolata, a hazelnut-chocolate flavor was announced as the 2002 Winter ice cream of the year.
2003	Ice cream of the year	Panna cotta	Three different panna cotta ice creams were regaled as the 2003 "Ice cream of the year". The varieties were orange, blueberry or rhubarb ice. The panna cotta rhubarb ice cream was voted as the best catering product in the 2003 British Frozen Food Federation's annual awards.
2003	Winter ice cream of the year	Honey-Almond	
2004	Ice cream of the year	Creme ricotta peach	
2011	Ice creations of the Winter	Creme Nougat	The Limited Edition flavor has hazelnut ice cream with pieces of nougat, hazelnut paste and cocoa.
2013	Ice cream creation of the Winter	Creme Vanillekipferl	

=== Yogurts ===
Premium low-fat yogurts are created under the Mövenpick brand, they were first sold through Germany's Bauer brand in 2013. In 2017, the yogurt limited edition Winter flavors included cherry-chocolate, vanilla, café nougatine and plum-cinnamon.

== Availability ==
While Mövenpick ice cream was originally only produced for their branded restaurants in Switzerland, as at 2011, it was sold in almost 40 countries. Products are sold through retail channels, parlours and hotels or restaurants.

The branded franchised stores ("dessert cafes", parlours, "Mövenpick boutiques", or "ice cream galleries") are in many different countries. The stores have also been named "Ice Dreams", for their focus on incorporating Mövenpick ice creams into dessert recipes. In 2010, the national retail manager for the brand in Australia, Dennis Koorey, described Mövenpick's parlours as a "...dine-in dessertery."

=== Retail ===
In 1989, Mövenpick attempted to introduce their ice creams in Canada, but encountered local production difficulties due to dairy industry buy-outs. In July 1992, they again began selling their products in Canadian supermarkets, but with revised packaging. Instead of 1-litre rectangular brick-size packages, the ice cream was packaged in Häagen-Dazs-style 500ml tubs.

In 1999, six flavors of Mövenpick ice creams were introduced to the Japanese market at convenience stores, through a Japanese subsidiary company.

In 2008, four flavors (Swiss Chocolate, Maple Walnut, Panna Cotta, White Peach & Redcurrant) of Mövenpick ice creams in 500ml containers, began being sold in England's Tesco supermarkets. In 2013, Mövenpick made an agreement with England's Ocado supermarkets to sell four flavors (Caramelita, Swiss Chocolate, Vanilla Dream and Strawberry) in 900ml containers.

In 2007, Hemglass began a contract as the exclusive seller of Mövenpick products in Sweden, at their ice cream vans.

In 2016, Mövenpick again began selling ice cream in 500ml tubs in supermarkets. Ice cream flavors offered included Vanilla Dream, Swiss Chocolate, Strawberry, Caramelita, Maple Walnut and Tiramisu. Sorbet flavors included Raspberry & Strawberry and Passionfruit & Mango.

=== Stores ===
==== Asia Pacific ====
Australia

Mövenpick stores first opened in Australia in Sydney and the Gold Coast. In 2007, Crepe Cafe chain owners Norbert and Amel Baillette opened the second Australian Mövenpick store in Portside Wharf, Hamilton, Brisbane. In early 2008, they opened at Bondi Beach, launching the Gingerbread ice cream and Orange & Grapefruit sorbet. In May, 70 celebrities were given "silver spoons", entitling them to free ice cream for the remainder of 2008.

That same year, stores opened in Cairns' Sanctuary Cove, Manly, Melbourne's Docklands and Brisbane's Petrie Terrace. In 2009, they opened at the Gold Coast's Broadbeach and Brisbane's South Bank.

In 2010, the 11 stores across Australia were fitted out with rebranded color schemes of black, white and some red, replacing the earthy and natural colors and tones. At the time, 10 of the parlours were franchised and the Bondi Beach store was company-owned.

In 2011, the first boutique café concept opened at Doncaster Westfield, Melbourne.

In 2012, they opened a boutique in Newcastle, and another in Melbourne's Box Hill in June.

In January 2015, a boutique opened in Adelaide.

In March 2016, the Canberra store opened at the Kingston foreshore.

In October 2009, the Brisbane (South Bank) store exhibited confectionery-inspired jewellery by designer Liana Kabel. Kabel's designs reused materials such as buttons, tape measures and knitting needles.

As of 2019 Mövenpick has only 6 of the 25 stores open and is currently in federal court of Australia facing legal action by its franchisee for alleged misleading and deceptive conduct.

China

In December 2016, the first Mövenpick store was opened in China, in a shopping mall in Guangzhou TaiKoo Hui. The store was opened by Swire Pacific, Mövenpick's exclusive distributor for the mainland.

Hong Kong

In August 1993, Mövenpick opened a boutique in Discovery Bay. The store had previously been a Häagen-Dazs-branded ice cream parlour. That same year, two boutiques were also opened in Tsim Sha Tsui.

New Zealand

In 2003, Mövenpick opened their Caffe Glacier at Mission Bay, Auckland, at the former site of a Death by Chocolate franchised store. In 2011, a fifth store for Auckland in Quay Street was opened, and was the first full concept parlour for New Zealand.

In September 2012, Mövenpick planned to open a storefront on the corner of Manners Mall and Victoria Street, Wellington. A previous store within the Caffers Dock apartment complex was closed circa 2009.

In December 2016, a Mövenpick store was opened in Paihia, in the Bay of Islands.

Singapore

Between 2000 and 2003, Mövenpick opened two ice cream parlors at Tangs Plaza on Scotts Road and Great World City Shopping Center in Tanglin.

In late 2006, Mövenpick opened a seaside kiosk at Palawan Beach, Sentosa.

===== South Asia =====
Bangladesh

Mövenpick has been available in Bangladesh since 2007. There are three stores located in Dhaka with several partner locations and retail stores selling them in other parts of the country.

India

In 2001, Mövenpick opened their first Indian café in New Delhi. Other boutiques were later opened in Bangalore and Chennai. In September 2002, Mövenpick ended their franchisee agreement with Ravi Jaipuria. Jaipuria stated that this was due to high real estate costs and low customer traffic, however a Mövenpick representative alleged that Jaipuria did not spend enough time on the franchise. In 2003, Mövenpick relaunched in the country through agreements with Rai and Sons. In 2011, Mövenpick had stores in Kalaghoda and Peddar Road. In 2013, Mövenpick had a distribution agreement with Star Foods Specialty. In 2014, the third Indian Mövenpick store opened at Select City Walk, Saket, New Delhi. In September 2015, the first Mumbai boutique was opened on Juhu Tara road.

Mövenpick ice creams are imported into India by Nectar Hospitality.

In 2020, Mövenpick relaunched in the country through agreements with Mr Vedant Deshpande (managing director) of Koala Super Premium Pvt Ltd. They have been appointed as the exclusive import and distribution partner for Mövenpick Ice Cream in India from 1 January 2020.

Pakistan

There are Mövenpick boutiques and kiosks in shopping malls in Karachi and Lahore. In April 2015, a boutique was opened in the Country and Golf Club in the Defence Housing Authority, Karachi.

Sri Lanka

In 2004, tea producer Dilmah collaborated with Mövenpick to create ice cream tea-shakes for their parlors.

== Media coverage ==
In June 1996, in response to complaints by English MPs and parliamentary staff, Mövenpick ice creams were removed from the House of Commons menu. The branded ice creams had been available on the menu for two days prior to removal. The complainants alleged that it was unpatriotic for the German-produced Swiss brand to be sold in the parliament in the midst of bovine spongiform encephalopathy-related export bans on English beef in Germany.

In October 2006, a customer complaint letter was published in the New Zealand Herald. The complainant alleged that staff at the Auckland Mövenpick store refused to serve a pregnant customer a free glass of tap water, as the company policy was to sell mineral water. Two days later, the same newspaper noted that the company policy had been changed to allow the serving of free tap water.

In September 2010, in an article in The Times, Mövenpick's tagline of "The art of Swiss ice cream" was used as an example in the proposed "Swissness Bill". The Swiss Government proposed to legally determine the requirements for products to be advertised as "made in Switzerland".

In June 2012, the Finnish Consumer Agency analysed the fruit, sugar and fat content of chocolate and strawberry ice creams sold from kiosks. Mövenpick's Swiss Chocolate flavor was found to have the highest amount of fat, among the brands and flavors tested.

In August 2016, Russia's consumer protection organisation Roscontrol found that Mövenpick ice creams contained more sucrose than indicated on the packaging.

In August 2017, Mövenpick raised prices of their ice creams in Switzerland by 2.5 per cent, to absorb increased costs of vanilla beans. The price increased after Cyclone Enawo devastated vanilla crops in Madagascar, as well as the increasing popularity of the ingredient.
