= Peter Minder =

Swiss modern pentathlete

Personal information
- Nationality: Swiss
- Born: 30 November 1956 (age 69)
- Height: 6 ft 2 in (188 cm)
- Weight: 174 lb (79 kg)

Sport
- Sport: Modern pentathlon

Peter Minder (born 30 November 1956) is a Swiss modern pentathlete. He competed at the 1984 Summer Olympics.
