= Mövenpick Hotels & Resorts =

Swiss hotel management company

- Company type: Subsidiary
- Industry: Hospitality, tourism
- Founded: 1948, Zürich, Switzerland
- Founder: Ueli Prager
- Headquarters: Baar, Switzerland
- Number of locations: 83 hotels
- Area served: Europe, Africa, Middle East and Asia
- Products: Business/Leisure hotels, resorts
- Number of employees: >16,000
- Parent: Accor
- Website: www.movenpick.accor.com

Mövenpick Hotels & Resorts (German pronunciation: [ˈmøːvənpɪk]; English: /ˈmuːvənˌpɪk/) is a Swiss hotel management company headquartered in Baar, Switzerland. It is fully owned by Accor since the September 2018 acquisition from former shareholders Mövenpick Holding (66.7%) and the Saudi-based Kingdom Group (33.3%). It operates over 80 properties, including hotels, resorts and Nile cruisers, with another 30 resorts planned or under construction across the Middle East and Asia. The hotel chain serves 5.8 million people per year.

== Mövenpick Group ==
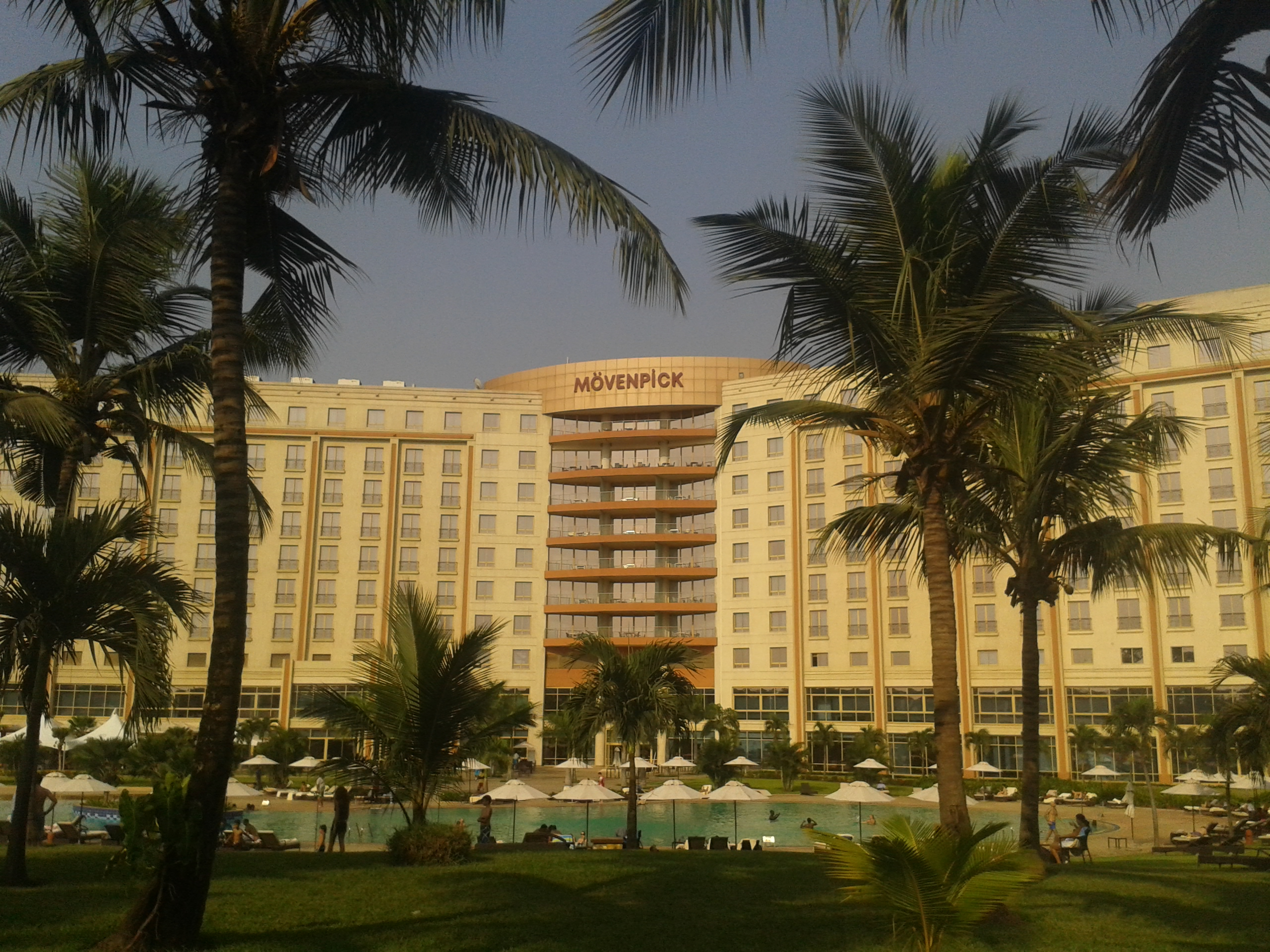
Mövenpick Ambassador Hotel Accra, Ghana

Mövenpick Hotels & Resorts traces its roots back to the privately owned Mövenpick Group, which was founded by Ueli Prager in 1948 when he opened his first restaurant in Zürich. The name was apparently inspired by the feeding action of a gull (in German, a Möwe) and how its simple movements reflected the restaurant's theme of food served as quickly as possible. Another rationale provided to employees in training materials stated that gulls picked at a variety of foods and that Mövenpick's varied menu inspired the gull mascot and name. The Mövenpick Ice Cream business was part of Prager's company, but today is completely separate.

== Mövenpick Hotels & Resorts ==
The official launch of Mövenpick Hotels & Resorts was marked by the opening of two hotels at Zurich Airport and Zürich-Regensdorf. Expansion beyond Europe started in 1976 with the opening in Cairo of the Mövenpick Hotel Jolie Ville. Mövenpick Hotels & Resorts were among the first companies to operate hotels under management contracts, which helped allow rapid growth. Expansion continued through the 1980s into Egypt, with the chain's first cruise ship (HS Radamis) beginning operations in 1991.

Alwaleed bought 27 percent of the chain in 1997, increasing that to 33 percent in 2003.

New expansions into Africa and the Middle East saw "pilgrim hotels" opened in Madinah in Saudi Arabia, and a period of hotel renovation and portfolio consolidation began. Rapid expansion continued through the early 2000s. In 2003, Mövenpick was named the "fastest growing hotel chain in the Middle East" by The World Travel Market.

A strategic partnership with Green Globe was announced in 2010, beginning a drive towards sustainability with a specific focus on the travel and tourism industry across all Mövenpick Hotels & Resorts properties.

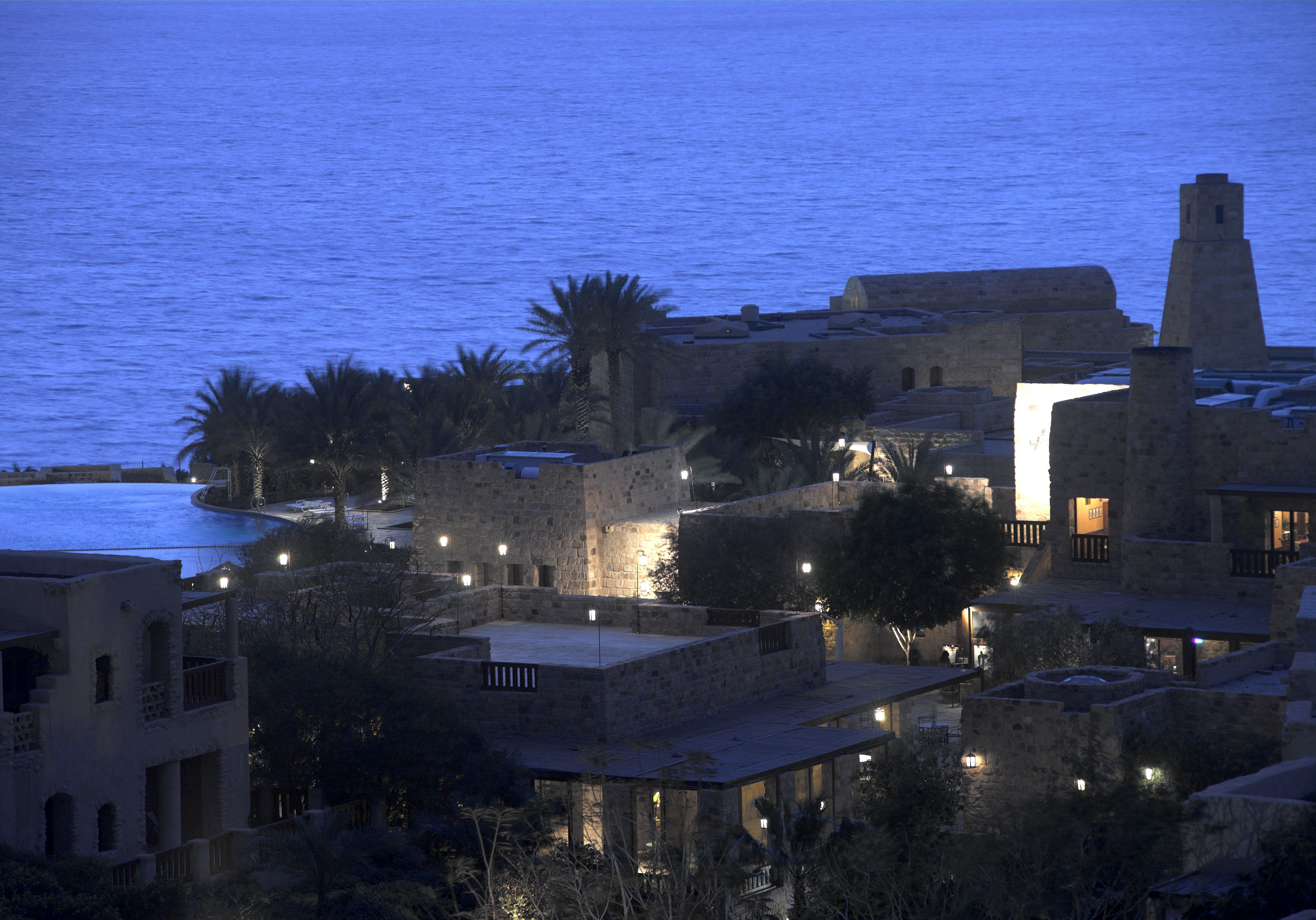
Movenpick Dead Sea Spa and Resort in Jordan

Certification and awards accompany further expansion into India, the Philippines, Singapore, and Ghana (2011). New hotels opened in China in 2013, and Pakistan in 2014, and Bangladesh in 2015.

As of 2015, Mövenpick Hotels & Resorts has 56 properties that are Green Globe certified: the highest number of certifications currently attained by any one hotel company.

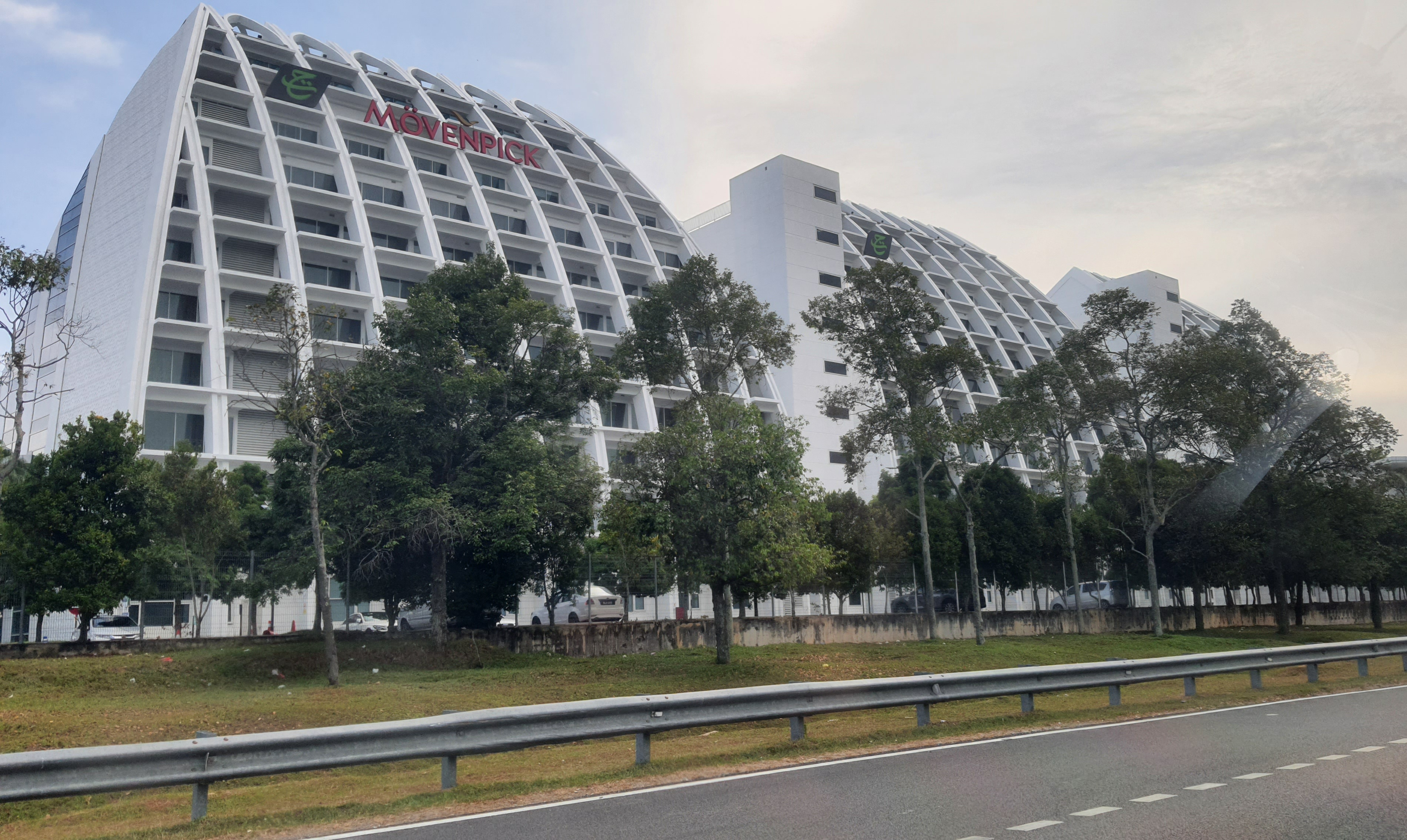
The exterior of the Mövenpick Hotel and Convention Center KLIA, located in Sepang, Malaysia

In January 2014, Mövenpick took over the Sheraton Karachi for a fifteen-year period. On October 8, 2015, Mövenpick announced its second property in Pakistan, after a contract to take over The Centaurus Hotel by early 2018. Olivier Chavy took up the position of CEO in September 2016.

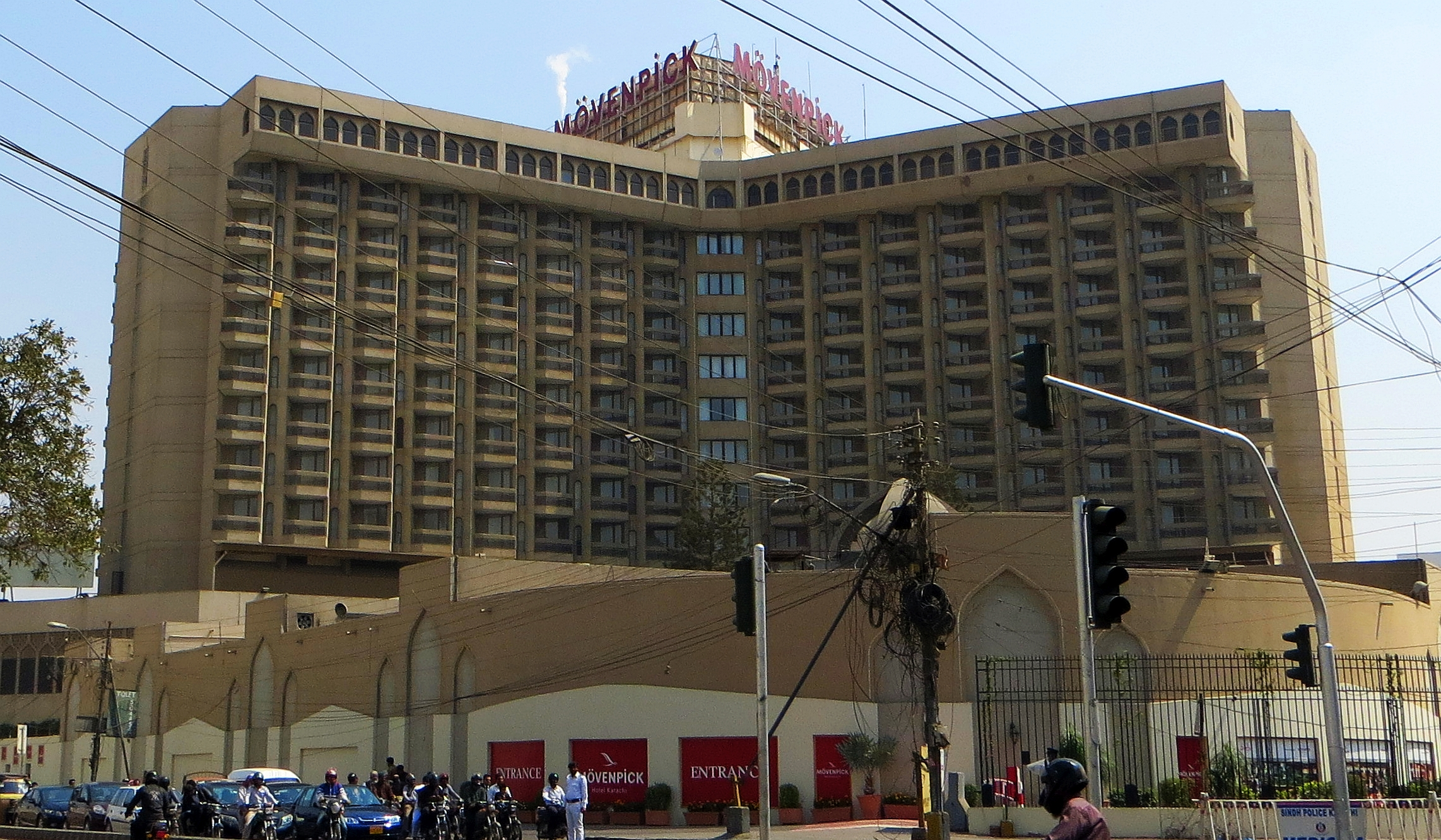
Mövenpick Hotel Karachi

=== Failed expansion ===
Toronto-based company Richtree Inc. (who had purchased the Canadian restaurant business) attempted to re-introduce Mövenpick to the US market, by opening a location in Boston with plans for additional US locations but lost $14.9 million in the 1999–2000 financial year. Of this amount, they paid $9.9 million in broken lease fees and restructuring costs. The fees were in relation to changed plans for establishing restaurants in New York (World Trade Center) and San Diego. Richtree sued Mövenpick Holding AG.

=== Acquisition by AccorHotels ===
AccorHotels announced in April 2018 that it signed an agreement with Mövenpick Holding and the Kingdom Holding to acquire the hotel group for CHF 560 million (EUR 482 million). The acquisition was completed in September 2018.
