= Ueli Staub =

Swiss journalist and musician (b. 1934 d. 2012)

- Born: 1 January 1934; Zürich, Switzerland
- Died: 9 April 2012 (aged 78); Thun, Switzerland
- Other names: Uli Staub
- Occupations: Vibraphonist; musician; journalist; photographer
- Musical career
- Genres: Jazz
- Instrument: Vibraphone
- Years active: 1953–2012

Ueli Staub (German pronunciation: [ˈuəli ˈʃtaʊp]; 1 January 1934 – 9 April 2012) was a Swiss vibraphonist, journalist and photographer. Staub was the founder of the Metronome Quartet (later Metronome Quintet), along with Swiss pianist Martin Hugelshofer, whom were both graduate students at the time.

== Life ==
Staub was a self-taught vibraphonist. He founded the Metronome Quartet with Martin Hugelshofer (born 13 July 1933 in Zürich) in 1953, which he played internationally from 1979 to 2001. He also played for the Robi Weber Quartet, Five Blazers, and Swiss All Stars. He also recorded an album with British saxophone and piano player Dennis Armitage (1928–2005). Staub married Margrit Staub-Hadorn in 1978, a Swiss TV announcer, presenter and author (1941–2007).

He also published two books (and was involved in one more):

- 1978 - Tempi passati
- 1994 - Portrait eines Jazz-Pioniers
- 2003 - Jazzstadt Zürich (edited by Ueli Staub)

Staub also worked as a journalist, specifically for the Swiss Neue Zürcher Zeitung, about music.

=== Metronome Quintet ===
In 1957, Swiss musician Bruno Spoerri (born 16 August 1935) joined the Metronome Quartet, which became Metronome Quintet, until 1975 when he left. His arrival marked a new era in the group, as even when he left another musician became a member, and so it always remained a quintet until its end in 2013. His arrival was also the beginning of the groups touring in Europe, and later in Japan in the Expo '70 in 1970.

== Discography ==
=== Singles ===
| Year | Title | Label(s) | Musical group(s) |
|---|---|---|---|
| 1959 | Tonbeispiele Von Jazz-Stilarten | Grammoclub Ex Libris; Schweizer Jugend-Verlag Solothurn | Metronome Quintet |
| 1959 | The Metronome Quintet | Grammoclub Ex Libris | Metronome Quintet |
| 1964 | Dusty Vibes | Columbia Records | Metronome Quintet |
| 1967 | Plays Swinging Mahagonny And Something Else | Columbia Records | Metronome Quintet |
| 1969 | With 57 Friends - At The Zoo | Columbia Records | Metronome Quintet |
| 1970 | The Metronome Quintet At The Expo 70 | Columbia Records | Metronome Quintet |
| 1973 | 20 Jahre Metronome Quintett | Metronome | Metronome Quintet |
| 1978 | Just Friends | Gold Records | Metronome Quintet |
| 1991 | Jazz Con Pasta | Promedia | Metronome Quintet |
| 1991 | Mercy Mercy Mercy | Reader's Digest | Robi Weber Quartet |
| 1993 | Kling Hinaus Ins Weite (Jazz & Lyrik, Vol. II) | Jecklin-Disco | Gert Westphal; Metronome Quintet |
| 1995 | All That Blues | Reader's Digest | Robi Weber Quartet |
| Unknown | Hey-ho / Amen | Columbia Records | Robi Weber Quartet |

=== Albums ===
| Year | Title | Label | Musical group/artist(s) |
|---|---|---|---|
| 1972 | Soulness | Columbia Records | Roby Weber Quartet |
| 1973 | Lover Of My Soul (Roby Weber Quartet Vol. 2) | Eugster CH-Record/CH-Record | Roby Weber Quartet |
| 1983 | Jazz Und Lyrik «Ringeljazz» (Lyrik Von Benn, Prévert Und Ringelnatz) | Jecklin-Disco | Gert Westphal/The Metronome Quintet |
| 2011 | Swiss All-Stars | Sonorama | Swiss All-Stars |
| Unknown | Out | Columbia Records | Dennis Armitage |

=== Posthumous release (album) ===
| Year | Title | Label | Musician |
|---|---|---|---|
| 2016 | Langstrasse Zwischen 12 Und 12 (Long Street Between 12 & 12) | Finders Keepers Records | Bruno Spoerri |

Discography here available at discogs.com (31 August 2019)
