= Basler Handelsgesellschaft =

Swiss trading company founded in 1859

- Type: Trading company, later holding company
- Industry: International trade, Manufacturing
- Founded: 1859
- Defunct: 1998 (merged with UTC)
- Fate: Transformed into financial holding, merged with UTC in 1997
- Headquarters: Basel, Switzerland
- Key people: Wilhelm Preiswerk (President, 1921)
- Products: Palm oil, Cocoa, Cotton, Textiles
- Revenue: 2.8 billion Swiss francs (1990)
- Number of employees: ~8,000 (1990)
- Parent: Basel Mission (until 1917)
- Subsidiaries: Union Trading Company International (from 1928)

The Basler Handelsgesellschaft (English: Basel Trading Company) was a Swiss trading company founded in 1859 under the name Missions-Handlungs-Gesellschaft (Mission Trading Company). The company adopted its final name in 1928 and operated as a major international trading enterprise with significant activities in Africa and India until its transformation into a financial holding company in 1998.

== History ==
=== Early years and expansion ===
The company was established in 1859 by Ulrich Zellweger as the Missions-Handlungs-Gesellschaft, maintaining close ties with the Christian Basel Mission until 1917. Its capital was provided by a small number of wealthy Basel families who supported the mission's commercial activities. The company's primary function was to supply European products to missionary establishments on the Gold Coast (present-day Ghana) and in South India, while importing palm oil, cocoa, and cotton back to Europe.

Beginning in 1882, the company established stations in South India that provided education and employment opportunities for converts. These facilities included textile factories and tile works, reflecting the company's expansion beyond pure trading into manufacturing. By 1916, the enterprise employed approximately 6,500 people worldwide, making it a significant multinational corporation of its era.

=== World War I challenges and recovery ===
The outbreak of World War I posed severe challenges for the company's operations. Between 1916 and 1919, British authorities progressively confiscated the company's properties in India and Africa, treating them as enemy property due to Germany's involvement in the conflict. The restitution process was lengthy, with Gold Coast properties returned in 1928 and Indian assets not restored until 1952.

=== Separation from Basel Mission ===
In 1928, the company underwent significant restructuring, separating from the Basel Mission and converting into a holding company. This transformation coincided with the adoption of its final name, Basler Handelsgesellschaft. The new structure maintained the company's commitment to supporting Christian charitable works through its profits, as specified in its corporate charter.

=== Union Trading Company International ===
Company president Wilhelm Preiswerk founded the Union Trading Company International (UTC) in 1921 to handle trade with the Gold Coast. Following the 1928 restructuring, UTC became a subsidiary of the Basler Handelsgesellschaft, responsible for the company's trading and production activities. By the 1960s, UTC employed approximately 6,000 people and generated annual revenue of 1 billion Swiss francs.

=== Adaptation to decolonization ===
The decolonization process around 1960 and the devaluation of African currencies in the late 1980s forced the company to seek new markets and diversify its operations. By 1995, UTC's activities in trade and consumer goods production had expanded to all five continents.

Between 1977 and 1996, the Basler Handelsgesellschaft held a majority stake in Jelmoli, a prominent Swiss department store chain. This investment represented the company's expansion into the domestic Swiss retail market and diversification beyond its traditional international trading activities.

=== Final years and dissolution ===
By 1990, the parent company employed approximately 8,000 people worldwide and achieved annual revenues of 2.8 billion Swiss francs. However, changing global economic conditions and the company's strategic focus led to its transformation into a purely financial holding company by 1998. The Basler Handelsgesellschaft merged with UTC in 1997, marking the end of its distinct corporate identity after nearly 140 years of operation.

== Bibliography ==
- G.A. Wanner, Die Basler Handels-Gesellschaft AG, 1859–1959, 1959
- R. Fischer, Die Basler Missionsindustrie in Indien 1850–1913, 1978
