= Hansüli Minder =

Swiss sports shooter

Personal information
- Nationality: Swiss
- Born: 16 March 1958 (age 67)

Sport
- Sport: Sports shooting

Hansüli Minder (born 16 March 1958) is a Swiss sports shooter. He competed at the 1984 Summer Olympics and the 1992 Summer Olympics.
