= 1979 Swiss federal election =

← 1975	21 October 1979	1983 →
- National Council
- All 200 seats in the National Council; 101 seats needed for a majority
- Turnout: 48.05% (▼4.31pp)
Party	Leader	Vote %	Seats	+/–
Social Democrats	Helmut Hubacher	24.44	51	−4
Free Democrats	Yann Richter	24.01	51	+4
Christian Democrats	Hans Wyer	21.29	44	−2
Swiss People's	Fritz Hofmann	11.6	23	+2
LdU	Walter Biel	4.07	8	−3
Liberals	Blaise Clerc	2.8	8	+2
Evangelical People's		2.22	3	0
Labour		2.08	3	−1
POCH		1.7	2	+2
National Action	Valentin Oehen	1.32	2	0
Republican		0.63	1	−3
Greens		0.63	1	+1
Entente Jurassienne		0.46	1	New
Autonomous Socialists		0.44	1	0
Jurassic Unity		0.41	1	New
This lists parties that won seats. See the complete results below.
- Council of States
- All 46 seats in the Council of States; 24 seats needed for a majority
Party	Seats	+/–
Christian Democrats	18	+1
Free Democrats	11	−4
Social Democrats	9	+4
Swiss People's	5	0
Liberals	3	+2
This lists parties that won seats. See the complete results below.

Federal elections were held in Switzerland on 21 October 1979. The Social Democratic Party and the Free Democratic Party emerged as the largest parties in the National Council, both winning 51 of the 200 seats.

== Results ==
=== National Council ===
Party	Votes	%	Seats	+/–
Social Democratic Party	447,990	24.44	51	–4
Free Democratic Party	440,099	24.01	51	+4
Christian Democratic People's Party	390,281	21.29	44	–2
Swiss People's Party	212,705	11.60	23	+2
Alliance of Independents	74,623	4.07	8	–3
Liberal Party	51,258	2.80	8	+2
Evangelical People's Party	40,744	2.22	3	0
Swiss Party of Labour	38,187	2.08	3	–1
Swiss Progressive Organisations	31,128	1.70	2	+2
National Action	24,257	1.32	2	0
Republican Movement	11,587	0.63	1	–3
Green Party	11,583	0.63	1	+1
Autonomous Socialist Party	8,147	0.44	1	0
Federal Democratic Union	4,626	0.25	0	0
Feminist and Green Alternative Groups	3,236	0.18	0	–
Other parties	42,740	2.33	2	–
Total	1,833,191	100.00	200	0
Valid votes	1,833,191	98.74		
Invalid/blank votes	23,460	1.26		
Total votes	1,856,651	100.00		
Registered voters/turnout	3,864,285	48.05		
Source: Nohlen & Stöver

==== By constituency ====
Constituency	Seats	Electorate	Turnout	Party	Votes	Seats won
Aargau	14	268,819	122,659	Social Democratic Party	467,304	4
Aargau	14	268,819	122,659	Christian Democratic People's Party	380,057	4
Aargau	14	268,819	122,659	Free Democratic Party	347,187	3
Aargau	14	268,819	122,659	Swiss People's Party	234,691	2
Aargau	14	268,819	122,659	Ring of Independents	93,658	1
Aargau	14	268,819	122,659	Evangelical People's Party	85,202	0
Aargau	14	268,819	122,659	Republican Movement	36,056	0
Aargau	14	268,819	122,659	National Action	27,145	0
Aargau	14	268,819	122,659	Revolutionary Marxist League	15,212	0
Aargau	14	268,819	122,659	Social Liberal European Federalist Party	3,656	0
Appenzell Ausserrhoden	2	Elected unopposed		Free Democratic Party		1
Appenzell Ausserrhoden	2	Elected unopposed		Social Democratic Party		1
Appenzell Innerrhoden	1	8,174	1,964	Christian Democratic People's Party	1,853	1
Appenzell Innerrhoden	1	8,174	1,964	Others	54	0
Basel-Landschaft	7	134,554	57,940	Social Democratic Party	126,256	2
Basel-Landschaft	7	134,554	57,940	Free Democratic Party	107,104	2
Basel-Landschaft	7	134,554	57,940	Christian Democratic People's Party	46,284	1
Basel-Landschaft	7	134,554	57,940	Swiss People's Party	42,341	1
Basel-Landschaft	7	134,554	57,940	Ring of Independents	31,500	1
Basel-Landschaft	7	134,554	57,940	Swiss Progressive Organisations	28,506	0
Basel-Landschaft	7	134,554	57,940	Evangelical People's Party	15,472	0
Basel-Landschaft	7	134,554	57,940	Party of Labour	4,118	0
Basel-Stadt	7	140,392	55,356	Social Democratic Party	128,153	3
Basel-Stadt	7	140,392	55,356	Free Democratic Party	54,225	1
Basel-Stadt	7	140,392	55,356	Christian Democratic People's Party	53,570	1
Basel-Stadt	7	140,392	55,356	Liberal Party	43,148	1
Basel-Stadt	7	140,392	55,356	Swiss Progressive Organisations	39,576	1
Basel-Stadt	7	140,392	55,356	Ring of Independents	29,103	0
Basel-Stadt	7	140,392	55,356	Party of Labour	17,963	0
Basel-Stadt	7	140,392	55,356	National Action	15,132	0
Basel-Stadt	7	140,392	55,356	Revolutionary Marxist League	3,082	0
Basel-Stadt	7	140,392	55,356	Social Liberal European Federalist Party	400	0
Bern	29	601,067	299,125	Swiss People's Party	2,689,061	10
Bern	29	601,067	299,125	Social Democratic Party	2,604,568	9
Bern	29	601,067	299,125	Free Democratic Party	1,532,680	6
Bern	29	601,067	299,125	National Action	305,344	1
Bern	29	601,067	299,125	Evangelical People's Party	287,246	1
Bern	29	601,067	299,125	Ring of Independents	263,902	1
Bern	29	601,067	299,125	Entente Jurassienne	238,793	1
Bern	29	601,067	299,125	Christian Democratic People's Party	211,171	0
Bern	29	601,067	299,125	Swiss Progressive Organisations	117,994	0
Bern	29	601,067	299,125	Federal Democratic Union	100,099	0
Bern	29	601,067	299,125	Democratic Alternative	92,612	0
Bern	29	601,067	299,125	Citizens' List Against the Accumulation of Offices	26,979	0
Bern	29	601,067	299,125	Party of Labour	22,161	0
Bern	29	601,067	299,125	Republican Movement	16,895	0
Bern	29	601,067	299,125	Revolutionary Marxist League	16,504	0
Bern	29	601,067	299,125	Social Liberal European Federalist Party	7,020	0
Fribourg	6	115,172	56,020	Christian Democratic People's Party	131,487	3
Fribourg	6	115,172	56,020	Social Democratic Party	101,272	2
Fribourg	6	115,172	56,020	Free Democratic Party	75,731	1
Fribourg	6	115,172	56,020	Swiss People's Party	21,237	0
Geneva	11	182,765	68,654	Social Democratic Party	156,909	3
Geneva	11	182,765	68,654	Liberal Party	155,489	2
Geneva	11	182,765	68,654	Party of Labour	145,154	2
Geneva	11	182,765	68,654	Free Democratic Party	107,497	2
Geneva	11	182,765	68,654	Christian Democratic People's Party	102,239	1
Geneva	11	182,765	68,654	Vigilance	47,865	1
Geneva	11	182,765	68,654	Revolutionary Marxist League	10,936	0
Geneva	11	182,765	68,654	National Action	4,428	0
Glarus	1	22,726	8,037	Swiss People's Party	6,394	1
Glarus	1	22,726	8,037	Others	1,423	0
Grisons	5	100,685	46,168	Christian Democratic People's Party	79,143	2
Grisons	5	100,685	46,168	Free Democratic Party	51,169	1
Grisons	5	100,685	46,168	Swiss People's Party	47,280	1
Grisons	5	100,685	46,168	Social Democratic Party	45,878	1
Jura	2	40,981	24,010	Christian Democratic People's Party	17,901	1
Jura	2	40,981	24,010	People's List for Jurassic Unity	14,923	1
Jura	2	40,981	24,010	Free Democratic Party	14,709	0
Lucerne	9	182,390	107,952	Christian Democratic People's Party	480,552	5
Lucerne	9	182,390	107,952	Free Democratic Party	302,011	3
Lucerne	9	182,390	107,952	Social Democratic Party	119,289	1
Lucerne	9	182,390	107,952	Swiss Progressive Organisations	48,860	0
Lucerne	9	182,390	107,952	Revolutionary Marxist League	1,855	0
Neuchâtel	5	97,241	42,059	Social Democratic Party	76,115	2
Neuchâtel	5	97,241	42,059	Liberal Party	53,729	2
Neuchâtel	5	97,241	42,059	Free Democratic Party	41,855	1
Neuchâtel	5	97,241	42,059	Party of Labour	15,649	0
Neuchâtel	5	97,241	42,059	Ring of Independents	9,732	0
Neuchâtel	5	97,241	42,059	Revolutionary Marxist League	3,360	0
Neuchâtel	5	97,241	42,059	Democratic Alternative	2,941	0
Nidwalden	1	18,345	10,951	Christian Democratic People's Party	5,318	1
Nidwalden	1	18,345	10,951	Free Democratic Party	4,189	0
Nidwalden	1	18,345	10,951	Social Democratic Party	1,135	0
Nidwalden	1	18,345	10,951	Others	96	0
Obwalden	1	10,060	6,796	Christian Democratic People's Party	4,209	1
Obwalden	1	10,060	6,796	Others	188	0
Schaffhausen	2	42,953	32,240	Social Democratic Party	21,662	1
Schaffhausen	2	42,953	32,240	Free Democratic Party	19,787	1
Schaffhausen	2	42,953	32,240	Swiss People's Party	12,957	0
Schaffhausen	2	42,953	32,240	Evangelical People's Party	3,856	0
Schaffhausen	2	42,953	32,240	Swiss Progressive Organisations	3,511	0
Schaffhausen	2	42,953	32,240	Revolutionary Marxist League	564	0
Schwyz	3	58,170	28,281	Christian Democratic People's Party	40,832	2
Schwyz	3	58,170	28,281	Free Democratic Party	23,183	1
Schwyz	3	58,170	28,281	Social Democratic Party	18,697	0
Solothurn	7	138,097	78,551	Free Democratic Party	210,598	3
Solothurn	7	138,097	78,551	Social Democratic Party	153,438	2
Solothurn	7	138,097	78,551	Christian Democratic People's Party	148,776	2
Solothurn	7	138,097	78,551	Swiss Progressive Organisations	21,982	0
Solothurn	7	138,097	78,551	Party of Labour	5,160	0
St. Gallen	12	231,681	104,269	Christian Democratic People's Party	542,444	6
St. Gallen	12	231,681	104,269	Free Democratic Party	339,587	3
St. Gallen	12	231,681	104,269	Social Democratic Party	221,052	2
St. Gallen	12	231,681	104,269	Ring of Independents	101,333	1
St. Gallen	12	231,681	104,269	Evangelical People's Party	26,102	0
Ticino	8	150,693	90,519	Free Democratic Party	250,842	3
Ticino	8	150,693	90,519	Christian Democratic People's Party	235,760	3
Ticino	8	150,693	90,519	Social Democratic Party	104,884	1
Ticino	8	150,693	90,519	Autonomous Socialist Party	64,845	1
Ticino	8	150,693	90,519	Party of Labour	18,848	0
Ticino	8	150,693	90,519	Swiss People's Party	15,882	0
Thurgau	6	106,712	51,537	Swiss People's Party	80,645	2
Thurgau	6	106,712	51,537	Christian Democratic People's Party	75,144	2
Thurgau	6	106,712	51,537	Social Democratic Party	68,381	1
Thurgau	6	106,712	51,537	Free Democratic Party	51,507	1
Thurgau	6	106,712	51,537	Ring of Independents	16,054	0
Thurgau	6	106,712	51,537	Republican Movement	6,142	0
Thurgau	6	106,712	51,537	National Action	5,834	0
Thurgau	6	106,712	51,537	Social Liberal European Federalist Party	1,218	0
Uri	1	21,549	12,112	Free Democratic Party	4,462	1
Uri	1	21,549	12,112	Social Democratic Party	2,635	0
Uri	1	21,549	12,112	Others	4,348	0
Vaud	16	310,274	115,657	Free Democratic Party	488,268	5
Vaud	16	310,274	115,657	Social Democratic Party	449,401	5
Vaud	16	310,274	115,657	Liberal Party	301,754	3
Vaud	16	310,274	115,657	Party of Labour	168,088	1
Vaud	16	310,274	115,657	Swiss People's Party	122,621	1
Vaud	16	310,274	115,657	Green Party	115,465	1
Vaud	16	310,274	115,657	Christian Democratic People's Party	91,630	0
Vaud	16	310,274	115,657	Constitution and Liberty Movement	29,149	0
Vaud	16	310,274	115,657	Revolutionary Marxist League	23,138	0
Vaud	16	310,274	115,657	Ring of Independents	14,463	0
Valais	7	135,196	88,789	Christian Democratic People's Party	356,727	4
Valais	7	135,196	88,789	Free Democratic Party	137,383	2
Valais	7	135,196	88,789	Social Democratic Party	70,086	1
Valais	7	135,196	88,789	Critical Oberwallis	15,423	0
Valais	7	135,196	88,789	Social Independent Movement	10,901	0
Valais	7	135,196	88,789	Non-Partisan Movement for Democracy and Progress	8,593	0
Valais	7	135,196	88,789	Liberal Party	4,970	0
Valais	7	135,196	88,789	Alliance of Conservatives, Radicals and Socialists	2,499	0
Zug	2	44,143	24,681	Christian Democratic People's Party	16,710	1
Zug	2	44,143	24,681	Free Democratic Party	16,062	1
Zug	2	44,143	24,681	Social Democratic Party	15,137	0
Zug	2	44,143	24,681	Revolutionary Marxist League	1,088	0
Zürich	35	694,321	322,362	Social Democratic Party	2,943,873	10
Zürich	35	694,321	322,362	Free Democratic Party	2,489,440	9
Zürich	35	694,321	322,362	Swiss People's Party	1,607,460	5
Zürich	35	694,321	322,362	Ring of Independents	1,241,695	4
Zürich	35	694,321	322,362	Christian Democratic People's Party	1,080,046	3
Zürich	35	694,321	322,362	Evangelical People's Party	630,485	2
Zürich	35	694,321	322,362	National Action	279,222	1
Zürich	35	694,321	322,362	Swiss Progressive Organisations	254,429	1
Zürich	35	694,321	322,362	Green Party	149,069	0
Zürich	35	694,321	322,362	Party of Labour	133,483	0
Zürich	35	694,321	322,362	Republican Movement	100,728	0
Zürich	35	694,321	322,362	Hopp Schwiiz!	78,476	0
Zürich	35	694,321	322,362	Federal Democratic Union	39,058	0
Zürich	35	694,321	322,362	Liberal Socialists	34,463	0
Zürich	35	694,321	322,362	Revolutionary Marxist League	28,735	0
Zürich	35	694,321	322,362	Social Liberal European Federalist Party	18,097	0
Zürich	35	694,321	322,362	Christians at the Gotthard	7,682	0
Zürich	35	694,321	322,362	European Federalist Party	5,030	0
Source: Bundesblatt, 4 December 1979

=== Council of the States ===
Party	Seats	+/–
Christian Democratic People's Party	18	+1
Free Democratic Party	11	–4
Social Democratic Party	9	+4
Swiss People's Party	5	0
Liberal Party	3	+2
Alliance of Independents	0	–1
Total	46	+2
Source: Nohlen & Stöver
