= Federal Democratic Union of Switzerland =

Political party in Switzerland

Federal Democratic Union of Switzerland Eidgenössisch-Demokratische Union (EDU) (German) Union Démocratique Fédérale (UDF) (French) Unione Democratica Federale (UDF) (Italian) Uniun Democrata Federala (UDF) (Romansh)
- President: Daniel Frischknecht
- Founded: 1975
- Headquarters: Frutigenstrasse 8; 3601 Thun
- Membership (2011): 3,000
- Ideology: Christian right Right-wing populism National conservatism Social conservatism Euroscepticism; Historical: Strasserism; Revolutionary nationalism Solidarism
- Political position: Right-wing to far-right
- Colours: Swiss Red
- Federal Council: 0 / 7
- National Council: 2 / 200
- Council of States: 0 / 46
- Cantonal legislatures: 21 / 2,544

Website
- www.edu-schweiz.ch

The Federal Democratic Union of Switzerland (German: Eidgenössisch-Demokratische Union, EDU; French: Union Démocratique Fédérale, UDF; Italian: Unione Democratica Federale, UDF; Romansch: Uniun Democrata Federala, UDF) is a national-conservative political party in Switzerland. Its ideology is politically conservative, Protestant fundamentalist, and right-wing populist. It is similar to the Christian right in the United States, and its top goals are to promote "biblical values" and oppose other cultures and values.

Founded in 1975, the party's current president is Daniel Frischknecht who succeeded the long-serving Hans Moser (2001–2020) in 2020. The EDU is a minor political party that polls around 1% of the vote and holds two seats in the Swiss National Council as of 2023.

== History ==
The EDU was founded in 1975 as a split of the Republican Movement and the Nationale Aktion. The EDU maintains that it split from the Evangelical People's Party.

At the beginning of its existence, the EDU's platform was strongly influenced by the ideology of Otto Strasser, revolutionary nationalism and solidarism. Despite being nationalistic and patriotic, the party supported socialist economic policies as opposed to capitalism or communism. In the early 1980s, the EDU underwent an ideological shift, with fundamentalist Christianity and the Bible becoming the most important parts of its ideology. It promoted socially conservative policies. At the same time, the EDU adopted right-wing populist positions on issues such as immigration, integration into supranational unions, and Islam. It adopted strongly pro-Israel views.

In the 1970s and 1980s, support for the EDU grew particularly with conservative free-church groups, both traditional and newly established. The language of the EDU was influenced during this time by a directive and on the basis of interest in dispensationalism from an eschatological tone.

In 1991, the EDU entered the Swiss National Council with one seat, and in 2003, it gained a second seat. Despite remaining a small, fringe party, it grew from having section in nine cantons in 1991 to twenty-three in 2003. The EDU had its greatest electoral success in the Canton of Bern and became relatively strong in the canton. In addition, its party newspaper, the EDU Standpunkt, had a circulation of between 31,000 and 45,000 and even up to 500,000 during national elections. The party created a French newspaper with a circulation of about 10,000. The EDU sponsored several referendums, attempting to block socially liberal legislation, but its attempts were unsuccessful.

In May 2007, the party became a member of the European Christian Political Movement, which claims: "The source of these Christian values are the Bible and the Christian tradition. These sources are in itself not a political program. These sources call us to serve the people of Europe...". The EDU is no longer listed as being a member of the ECPM.

The EDU received 1.3% of the popular vote in the 2007 elections, and retained one of its two seats in the Swiss National Council, held by Andreas Brönnimann, who represented the canton of Bern.

However, in the 2011 elections, the party lost its seat in the Swiss National Council, even though it still received the same percentage of the popular vote. In the 2019 elections the party won one seat in the Swiss National Council, regaining representation.

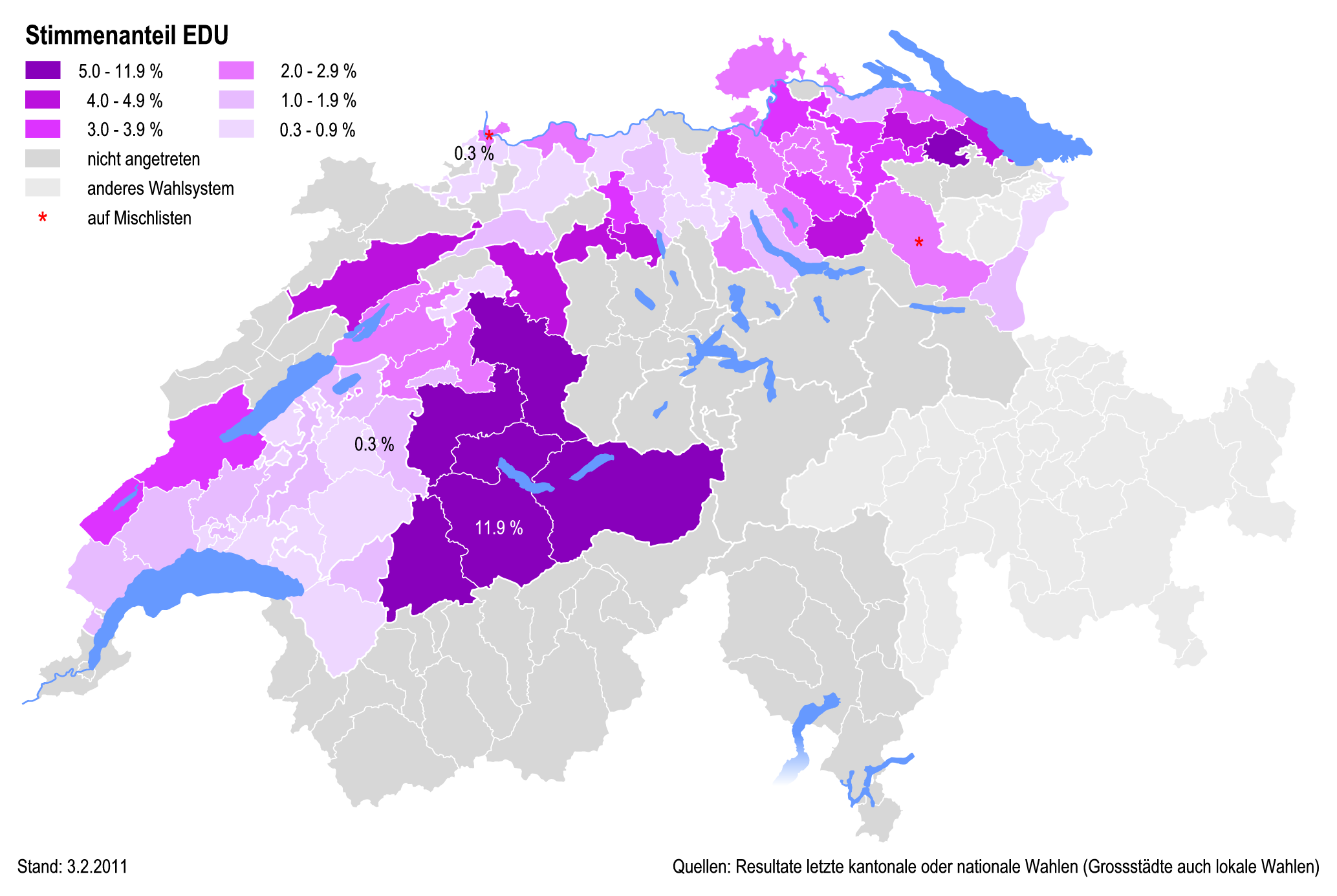
Percentages of the EDU at district level in 2011

== Ideology ==
The EDU is a politically conservative, Protestant fundamentalist, and right-wing populist party. It is similar to the Christian right in the United States, and its top goals were to promote "biblical values" and oppose other cultures and values. The party has also been described as "ultra-conservative."

The EDU sees itself as a Christian party and uses the Bible as the guideline for its policies. On questions concerning the environment, the EDU stands rather center-left, however with family, social, and educational policy, the EDU takes a conservative stance. The EDU want a debt-free state.

The EDU has close connections to free churches.

=== Social policy ===
The EDU rejects equating homosexual and heterosexual marriages and is committed against abortion, euthanasia, and the exploitation of women by sexist advertising. Thus, the EDU calls that abortion should not be financed by public funds and suicide tourism should be prohibited. Also, the EDU is against heroin clinics and calls for a smoking ban in restaurants and bars. The EDU supports traditional families. The EDU is skeptical of the equalization of both genders, saying that is neglecting of children, and believes that the main caregivers of children are ideally the parents. The EDU opposes the criminalization of homophobia.

The EDU sponsored an unsuccessful referendum, held on November 27, 2016, in the Canton of Zürich, that would have defined marriage as only between one man and one woman.

=== Foreign policy ===
The EDU is critical of the European Union, the UN, and NATO. As a Eurosceptic party, it is against membership in the EU, however it supports bilateral treaties with it. The EDU views the increased immigration to Switzerland as an integration problem and says that to increase security, adjusting the freedom of movement, the Schengen Agreement, and the Dublin Regulation with the EU is necessary. Also, the EDU is in support for permanent neutrality and is against peace-keeping missions of the Swiss military. The EDU supported the successful Swiss minaret ban, and the successful federal popular initiative "Against mass immigration".

=== Environmental policy ===
In environmental policy, the EDU does not see the real problem as in climate change, but rather in the enormous consumption of resources and energy. Thus, the EDU supports a dedicated, time-limited incentive tax on the oil tax for fossil fuels and propellants and calls the replacement of the Climate Cent and the CO_{2} tax (gasoline, etc.). The proceeds of this incentive tax would go to renewable energy sources such as water, wind, and solar energy and would promote energy efficiency. In the long term, the EDU wants to phase out nuclear energy in Switzerland. The EDU supports the expansion of the public transportation system, but only supports the implementation of large projects when funding is secured.

== Party presidents ==
- 1979–1989: Peter Rüst
- 1989–1995: Werner Scherrer
- 1995–2001: Christian Waber
- 2001–2020: Hans Moser
- 2020–present: Daniel Frischknecht

== Election results ==
=== National Council ===
National Council
Election	Votes	%	Seats	+/-
1975	6,717	0.3%	0 / 200	New
1979	4,626 ▼	0.3% ▼	0 / 200	Steady
1983	7,590 ▲	0.4% ▲	0 / 200	Steady
1987	17,830 ▲	0.9% ▲	0 / 200	Steady
1991	20,395 ▲	1.0% ▲	1 / 200	▲1
1995	24,795 ▲	1.3% ▲	1 / 200	Steady
1999	24,355 ▼	1.2% ▼	1 / 200	Steady
2003	26,590 ▲	1.3% ▲	2 / 200	▲1
2007	29,914 ▲	1.3% ▲	1 / 200	▼1
2011	31,056 ▲	1.3% ▲	0 / 200	▼1
2015	29,701 ▼	1.2% ▼	0 / 200	Steady
2019	24,145 ▼	1.0% ▼	1 / 200	▲1
2023	31,513 ▲	1.2% ▲	2 / 200	▲1

== Bibliography ==
- Skenderovic, Damir (2009). The radical right in Switzerland: continuity and change, 1945-2000. Berghahn Books. ISBN 978-1-84545-580-4.
