= Party of Labour of Basel =

Swiss political party

Party of Labour of Basel Partei der Arbeit Basel
- Founded: 1988
- Split from: PdA
- Headquarters: Basel
- Ideology: Communism; Marxism-Leninism
- Political position: Far-left

Website
- www.pda-basel.ch

1991 election poster of PdA 1944

The Party of Labour of Basel (German: Partei der Arbeit Basel), previously known as the Party of Labour Basel (founded in 1944) (in German: Partei der Arbeit Basel (gegr. 1944), abbreviated PdA 1944) is a political party in Basel, Switzerland. The party was formed after the orthodox pro-Soviet Basel party organization was expelled from the more reform-oriented Swiss Party of Labour in 1988.

== 1988 split in the Swiss Party of Labour ==
The PdA 1944 was formed in 1988, as the Basel party organization was expelled by the Swiss Party of Labour Central Committee. The PdA 1944 represented the orthodox, pro-Soviet sector of the erstwhile Basel section. At the time the Basel section was the strongest cantonal unit of the Swiss Party of Labour in German-speaking Switzerland. The split was preceded by a dispute in the Swiss Party of Labour in Basel over an occupation movement at a cultural centre in the traditional working class neighbourhood St. Johann. The Swiss Party of Labour Central Committee accused the Basel section of not adhering to new more liberal stances on youth, women, culture, minority rights, night work and alliance-building issues. The Basel section, by contrast, adhered to the 1971 party program.

Within the Basel section there was a minority of younger party activists, encouraged by the party organ Vorwärts, that was more in line with the positions of the Central Committee. The orthodox Basel section leadership suspended the party memberships of the pro-Central Committee faction. Following the split a 'New Party of Labour for Basel City and Basel Land' was set up, which was recognized by the Swiss Party of Labour Central Committee.

== Leadership ==
PdA 1944 had two seats in the cantonal legislature following the split. Benny Degen was one of the leaders of PdA 1944. As of 1991, Flurin Caviezel was the secretary of the party.

== 1991 elections and popular initiative ==
The PdA 1944 obtained 1.1% of the votes in the 1991 National Council election. In 1991, PdA 1944 organized a popular initiative titled 'for an increase and indexation of child allowances for employees', which gathered 4,400 signatures. The initiative was approved by the Grand Council.

== Name change ==
The 'New PdA Basel' was dissolved in 2014, after which the PdA 1944 adopted the name 'PdA Basel'. In 2019, a new section of the Swiss Party of Labour was formed in Basel (using the name 'PdAS Sektion Basel'), working in parallel with PdA Basel.
