= 1971 Swiss federal election =

Federal elections were held in Switzerland on 31 October 1971. Although the Social Democratic Party received the most votes, the Free Democratic Party emerged as the largest party in the National Council, winning 49 of the 200 seats. They were the first federal elections in which women were allowed to vote, following a referendum earlier in the year that introduced universal suffrage for federal elections.

== Results ==
=== National Council ===
Party	Votes	%	Seats	+/–
Social Democratic Party	456,233	22.90	46	–4
Free Democratic Party	432,259	21.70	49	0
Christian Democratic People's Party	407,225	20.44	44	–1
Swiss People's Party	220,487	11.07	23	–1
Alliance of Independents	152,086	7.63	13	–3
Republican Movement	84,700	4.25	7	+7
National Action	63,781	3.20	4	+3
Swiss Party of Labour	51,341	2.58	5	0
Liberal Democratic Union	43,710	2.19	6	0
Evangelical People's Party	42,778	2.15	3	0
Independent Social-Christian Party	5,946	0.30	0	–
Autonomous Socialist Party	5,271	0.26	0	New
Swiss Progressive Organisations	1,820	0.09	0	–
Other parties	24,679	1.24	0	–
Total	1,992,316	100.00	200	0
Valid votes	1,992,316	98.72		
Invalid/blank votes	25,761	1.28		
Total votes	2,018,077	100.00		
Registered voters/turnout	3,549,429	56.86		
Source: Nohlen & Stöver

==== By constituency ====
Constituency	Seats	Electorate	Turnout	Party	Votes	Seats won
Aargau	14	232,941	145,512	Social Democratic Party	474,648	3
Aargau	14	232,941	145,512	Christian Democratic People's Party	396,770	3
Aargau	14	232,941	145,512	Free Democratic Party	315,776	3
Aargau	14	232,941	145,512	Swiss People's Party	247,379	2
Aargau	14	232,941	145,512	Ring of Independents	187,426	2
Aargau	14	232,941	145,512	Republican Movement	115,305	1
Aargau	14	232,941	145,512	Evangelical People's Party	76,306	0
Aargau	14	232,941	145,512	National Action	68,260	0
Aargau	14	232,941	145,512	Team 67	51,975	0
Aargau	14	232,941	145,512	Free Eligible Voters and Non-Partisan Voters	36,972	0
Aargau	14	232,941	145,512	Free Voters for Education and Progress	8,243	0
Aargau	14	232,941	145,512	European Federalist Party	6,570	0
Appenzell Ausserrhoden	2	28,671	13,915	Free Democratic Party	15,924	1
Appenzell Ausserrhoden	2	28,671	13,915	Social Democratic Party	9,521	1
Appenzell Innerrhoden	1	7,624	2,386	Christian Democratic People's Party	2,217	1
Basel-Landschaft	7	114,565	59,320	Social Democratic Party	115,853	2
Basel-Landschaft	7	114,565	59,320	Free Democratic Party	94,370	2
Basel-Landschaft	7	114,565	59,320	Ring of Independents	56,704	1
Basel-Landschaft	7	114,565	59,320	Swiss People's Party	48,314	1
Basel-Landschaft	7	114,565	59,320	Christian Democratic People's Party	54,815	1
Basel-Landschaft	7	114,565	59,320	National Action	41,095	0
Basel-Stadt	7	149,309	69,418	Social Democratic Party	146,745	2
Basel-Stadt	7	149,309	69,418	Free Democratic Party	55,327	1
Basel-Stadt	7	149,309	69,418	Liberal Party	62,533	1
Basel-Stadt	7	149,309	69,418	Ring of Independents	61,133	1
Basel-Stadt	7	149,309	69,418	Christian Democratic People's Party	54,238	1
Basel-Stadt	7	149,309	69,418	National Action	38,678	1
Basel-Stadt	7	149,309	69,418	Party of Labour	29,246	0
Basel-Stadt	7	149,309	69,418	Republican Movement	23,593	0
Basel-Stadt	7	149,309	69,418	Swiss Progressive Organisations	8,859	0
Basel-Stadt	7	149,309	69,418	Free Opposition Party	2,008	0
Bern	31	601,381	347,799	Social Democratic Party	3,272,395	10
Bern	31	601,381	347,799	Swiss People's Party	3,086,851	10
Bern	31	601,381	347,799	Free Democratic Party	1,819,024	5
Bern	31	601,381	347,799	Ring of Independents	664,295	2
Bern	31	601,381	347,799	Christian Democratic People's Party	566,163	1
Bern	31	601,381	347,799	Evangelical People's Party	430,124	1
Bern	31	601,381	347,799	National Action	388,872	1
Bern	31	601,381	347,799	Republican Movement	221,004	1
Bern	31	601,381	347,799	Independent Social-Christian Party	91,632	0
Bern	31	601,381	347,799	Volkstümlich	4,736	0
Fribourg	6	104,385	55,827	Christian Democratic People's Party	136,147	3
Fribourg	6	104,385	55,827	Free Democratic Party	81,018	2
Fribourg	6	104,385	55,827	Social Democratic Party	65,253	1
Fribourg	6	104,385	55,827	Swiss People's Party	28,460	0
Fribourg	6	104,385	55,827	Independent Social-Christian Party	17,435	0
Geneva	11	173,910	81,670	Party of Labour	183,332	3
Geneva	11	173,910	81,670	Free Democratic Party	168,724	2
Geneva	11	173,910	81,670	Social Democratic Party	167,854	2
Geneva	11	173,910	81,670	Liberal Party	123,516	2
Geneva	11	173,910	81,670	Independent Social-Christian Party	120,939	2
Geneva	11	173,910	81,670	Ring of Independents	54,563	0
Geneva	11	173,910	81,670	Vigilance	47,504	0
Geneva	11	173,910	81,670	National Action	12,696	0
Glarus	1	22,016	13,582	Social Democratic Party	7,652	1
Glarus	1	22,016	13,582	Free Democratic Party	5,667	0
Grisons	5	89,842	50,960	Christian Democratic People's Party	93,234	2
Grisons	5	89,842	50,960	Swiss People's Party	85,146	2
Grisons	5	89,842	50,960	Free Democratic Party	37,034	1
Grisons	5	89,842	50,960	Social Democratic Party	34,801	0
Lucerne	9	165,445	109,655	Christian Democratic People's Party	473,336	5
Lucerne	9	165,445	109,655	Free Democratic Party	290,905	3
Lucerne	9	165,445	109,655	Social Democratic Party	120,390	1
Lucerne	9	165,445	109,655	Ring of Independents	84,561	0
Neuchâtel	5	96,306	46,491	Social Democratic Party	68,715	2
Neuchâtel	5	96,306	46,491	Free Democratic Party	54,661	2
Neuchâtel	5	96,306	46,491	Liberal Party	35,858	1
Neuchâtel	5	96,306	46,491	Party of Labour	30,778	0
Neuchâtel	5	96,306	46,491	Republican Movement	22,672	0
Neuchâtel	5	96,306	46,491	Progressive National Party	12,080	0
Nidwalden	1	14,794	7,596	Christian Democratic People's Party	6,425	1
Obwalden	1	14,371	7,721	Christian Democratic People's Party	7,547	1
Schaffhausen	2	40,982	32,257	Social Democratic Party	24,897	1
Schaffhausen	2	40,982	32,257	Free Democratic Party	20,500	1
Schaffhausen	2	40,982	32,257	Ring of Independents	7,548	0
Schaffhausen	2	40,982	32,257	Christian Democratic People's Party	4,984	0
Schaffhausen	2	40,982	32,257	National Action	3,983	0
Schwyz	3	50,787	22,844	Christian Democratic People's Party	24,758	1
Schwyz	3	50,787	22,844	Social Democratic Party	18,652	1
Schwyz	3	50,787	22,844	Free Democratic Party	13,124	1
Schwyz	3	50,787	22,844	We Want to Vote	7,800	0
Solothurn	7	128,238	82,369	Free Democratic Party	194,154	3
Solothurn	7	128,238	82,369	Christian Democratic People's Party	156,657	2
Solothurn	7	128,238	82,369	Social Democratic Party	148,795	2
Solothurn	7	128,238	82,369	Ring of Independents	40,527	0
Solothurn	7	128,238	82,369	National Action	25,844	0
St. Gallen	12	211,565	131,082	Christian Democratic People's Party	679,985	6
St. Gallen	12	211,565	131,082	Free Democratic Party	364,356	3
St. Gallen	12	211,565	131,082	Social Democratic Party	225,490	2
St. Gallen	12	211,565	131,082	Ring of Independents	108,322	1
St. Gallen	12	211,565	131,082	Republican Movement	108,035	0
St. Gallen	12	211,565	131,082	Evangelical People's Party	46,530	0
St. Gallen	12	211,565	131,082	Swiss Progressive Organisations	6,552	0
St. Gallen	12	211,565	131,082	European Federalist Party	5,227	0
Ticino	8	133,771	81,114	Free Democratic Party	242,069	4
Ticino	8	133,771	81,114	Christian Democratic People's Party	219,389	3
Ticino	8	133,771	81,114	Social Democratic Party	82,930	1
Ticino	8	133,771	81,114	Autonomous Socialist Party	42,116	0
Ticino	8	133,771	81,114	Party of Labour	17,314	0
Ticino	8	133,771	81,114	Swiss People's Party	15,364	0
Ticino	8	133,771	81,114	Republican Movement	10,984	0
Thurgau	6	96,996	60,159	Swiss People's Party	92,097	2
Thurgau	6	96,996	60,159	Christian Democratic People's Party	82,962	1
Thurgau	6	96,996	60,159	Social Democratic Party	73,228	1
Thurgau	6	96,996	60,159	Free Democratic Party	59,665	1
Thurgau	6	96,996	60,159	Republican Movement	31,120	1
Thurgau	6	96,996	60,159	National Action	14,999	0
Uri	1	19,694	11,039	Free Democratic Party	9,712	1
Vaud	16	288,668	132,382	Free Democratic Party	537,173	5
Vaud	16	288,668	132,382	Social Democratic Party	515,893	4
Vaud	16	288,668	132,382	Party of Labour	252,539	2
Vaud	16	288,668	132,382	Liberal Party	256,061	2
Vaud	16	288,668	132,382	Swiss People's Party	159,490	1
Vaud	16	288,668	132,382	Christian Democratic People's Party	108,558	1
Vaud	16	288,668	132,382	National Action	87,146	1
Vaud	16	288,668	132,382	Ring of Independents	85,011	0
Vaud	16	288,668	132,382	Republican Movement	60,816	0
Valais	7	119,854	80,589	Christian Democratic People's Party	341,294	5
Valais	7	119,854	80,589	Free Democratic Party	106,853	1
Valais	7	119,854	80,589	Social Democratic Party	85,778	1
Valais	7	119,854	80,589	Social Independent Movement	20,380	0
Zug	2	Elected unopposed		Christian Democratic People's Party		1
Zug	2	Elected unopposed		Free Democratic Party		1
Zürich	35	644,893	372,435	Social Democratic Party	2,688,278	8
Zürich	35	644,893	372,435	Free Democratic Party	2,158,558	6
Zürich	35	644,893	372,435	Ring of Independents	2,127,106	6
Zürich	35	644,893	372,435	Swiss People's Party	1,566,199	5
Zürich	35	644,893	372,435	Republican Movement	1,448,131	4
Zürich	35	644,893	372,435	Christian Democratic People's Party	1,228,888	3
Zürich	35	644,893	372,435	Evangelical People's Party	668,427	2
Zürich	35	644,893	372,435	National Action	637,912	1
Zürich	35	644,893	372,435	Party of Labour	205,984	0
Zürich	35	644,893	372,435	European Federalist Party	43,931	0
Zürich	35	644,893	372,435	Erwa-Bund	39,784	0
Zürich	35	644,893	372,435	Helvetic People's Movement Against Foreign Infiltration	32,288	0
Zürich	35	644,893	372,435	The Initiators	24,633	0
Zürich	35	644,893	372,435	Swiss People's Party	9,000	0
Source: Bundesblatt, 17 November 1971

=== Council of the States ===
Party	Seats	+/–
Christian Democratic People's Party	17	–1
Free Democratic Party	15	+1
Swiss People's Party	5	–1
Social Democratic Party	4	+2
Liberal Democratic Union	2	–1
Alliance of Independents	1	0
Total	44	0
Source: Nohlen & Stöver
