= Bernhard Hess =

Swiss politician

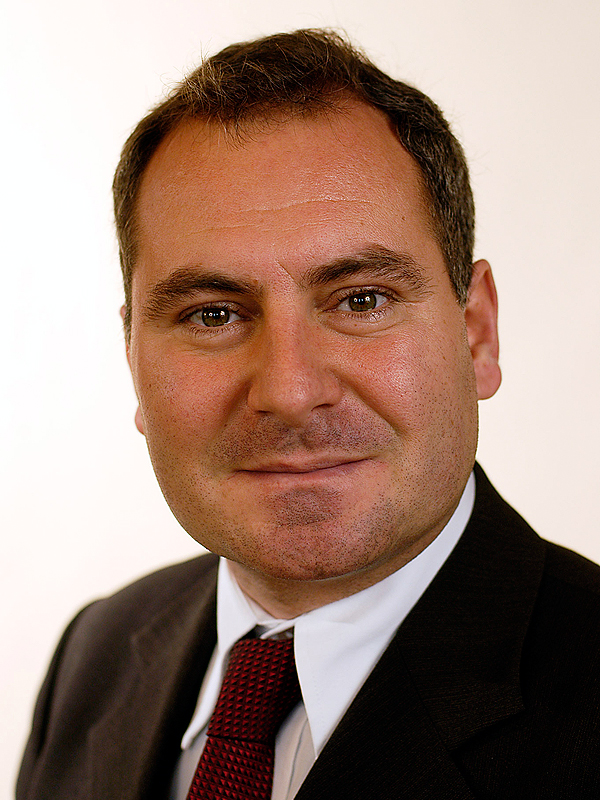

Bernhard Hess (born 5 April 1966) is a Swiss politician from the canton of Bern. He was the president of the Swiss Democrats from 2005 to 2012 and was a member of the National Council from 5 December 1999 to 1 December 2007.

Hess was born in Solothurn, and grew up in Langnau im Emmental, the son of Karl and Margot Hess. His father was a secondary school teacher of Latin and Greek and an activist of the Nationale Aktion (later the Swiss Democrats). His mother was the daughter of Swiss expatriates in Germany, and she lived Königsberg until the end of World War II. Hess completed a management apprenticeship, and then started a career as a loan officer at a bank.

In 1988, Hess joined the Nationale Aktion (what would later be called the Swiss Democrats). Between 1994 and 1998, he served on the city council of Bern. In 1998 he was elected to the Grand Council of Bern, the cantonal parliament. In the Federal Assembly elections in 1999, Hess was elected as the only Swiss Democrat in the National Council. In the 2007 election he lost this seat.

Since 1992, Hess has worked full-time for the Swiss Democrats. From 1993 to 1995, he was secretary of the Swiss Democrats/Ticino League group in the Federal Assembly, and from 1995 to 1999 he was secretary for the Swiss Democrats group. From 2003 to 2005 he was general secretary of the party. Hess is a member of the Campaign for an Independent and Neutral Switzerland, Pro Libertate, and the Sprachkreises Deutsch. During his time in the leadership of the Swiss Democrats, he discussed forming an alliance of right-wing parties in Switzerland, including the Ticino League and Geneva Citizens' Movement.
