= 1991 Swiss federal election =

- 20 October 1991
- All 200 seats in the National Council (101 seats needed for a majority); All 46 seats in the Council of States (24 seats needed for a majority)
- Turnout: 46.0% ▼0.5 pp
Party	Leader	Vote %	Seats	+/–
National Council
Free Democrats	Franz Steinegger	21.0%	44	−7
Social Democrats	Peter Bodenmann	18.5%	41	0
Christian Democrats	Eva Segmüller	18.0%	35	−7
Swiss People's	Hans Uhlmann	14.9%	25	0
Greens	Hanspeter Thür	6.1%	14	+5
Motorists'	Jürg Scherrer	5.1%	8	+6
Swiss Democrats	Rudolf Keller	3.4%	5	+2
Liberals	Claude Bonnard	3.0%	10	+1
LdU	Franz Jaeger	2.8%	5	−3
Evangelical People's	Max Dünki	1.9%	3	0
Ticino League	Giuliano Bignasca	1.4%	2	New
Federal Democrats	Werner Scherrer	1.0%	1	+1
Labour		0.8%	2	+1
Unitarian Socialists		0.6%	1	0
Christian Social		0.4%	1	+1
Entente		0.3%	1	+1
FraP!		0.3%	1	+1
KHM	Herbert Maeder	0.3%	1	0
Council of States
Free Democrats			18	+4
Christian Democrats			16	−3
Swiss People's			4	0
Social Democrats			3	−2
Liberals			3	0
LdU			1	0
Ticino League			1	New
This lists parties that won seats. See the complete results below.
Map of Swiss cantons colored by the party that won the most votes. The seats that were won in the cantons for both the National Council and the Council of States are shown as well.

Federal elections were held in Switzerland on 20 October 1991. The Free Democratic Party remained the largest party in the National Council, winning 44 of the 200 seats.

== Results ==
=== National Council ===
Party	Votes	%	Seats	+/–
Free Democratic Party	429,072	20.99	44	–7
Social Democratic Party	377,968	18.49	41	0
Christian Democratic People's Party	367,928	18.00	35	–7
Swiss People's Party	243,268	11.90	25	0
Green Party	124,149	6.07	14	+5
Swiss Motorists' Party	103,585	5.07	8	+6
Swiss Democrats	69,297	3.39	5	+2
Liberal Party	62,073	3.04	10	+1
Alliance of Independents	57,819	2.83	5	–3
Evangelical People's Party	38,681	1.89	3	0
Ticino League	28,290	1.38	2	New
Swiss Progressive Organisations	24,946	1.22	0	–4
Federal Democratic Union	20,395	1.00	1	+1
Swiss Party of Labour	15,871	0.78	2	+1
Unitarian Socialist Party	12,006	0.59	1	0
Independent Social-Christian Party	8,039	0.39	1	+1
Jura Alliance	5,258	0.26	1	+1
Frauen Macht Politik!	5,211	0.25	1	+1
Herbert Mäder Committee	5,162	0.25	1	0
Other parties	45,083	2.21	0	–
Total	2,044,101	100.00	200	0
Valid votes	2,044,101	98.42		
Invalid/blank votes	32,800	1.58		
Total votes	2,076,901	100.00		
Registered voters/turnout	4,510,521	46.05		
Source: Nohlen & Stöver

==== By constituency ====
Constituency	Seats	Electorate	Turnout	Party	Votes	Seats won
Aargau	14	332,650	140,909	Swiss People's Party	346,119	3
Aargau	14	332,650	140,909	Social Democratic Party	337,007	2
Aargau	14	332,650	140,909	Free Democratic Party	317,931	3
Aargau	14	332,650	140,909	Christian Democratic People's Party	280,324	2
Aargau	14	332,650	140,909	Swiss Motorists' Party	256,217	2
Aargau	14	332,650	140,909	Green Party	132,264	1
Aargau	14	332,650	140,909	Swiss Democrats	86,561	0
Aargau	14	332,650	140,909	Ring of Independents	83,324	1
Aargau	14	332,650	140,909	Evangelical People's Party	63,915	0
Aargau	14	332,650	140,909	Federal Democratic Union	26,823	0
Aargau	14	332,650	140,909	List of An Individual	4,831	0
Aargau	14	332,650	140,909	Europe Party	3,191	0
Appenzell Ausserrhoden	2	34,850	15,520	Herbert Maeder Committee	10,310	1
Appenzell Ausserrhoden	2	34,850	15,520	Free Democratic Party	8,664	1
Appenzell Ausserrhoden	2	34,850	15,520	Christian Democratic People's Party	4,698	0
Appenzell Ausserrhoden	2	34,850	15,520	Swiss Motorists' Party	4,438	0
Appenzell Innerrhoden	1	8,967	2,027	Christian Democratic People's Party	3,748	1
Appenzell Innerrhoden	1	8,967	2,027	Others	49	0
Basel-Landschaft	7	160,760	71,589	Free Democratic Party	122,018	2
Basel-Landschaft	7	160,760	71,589	Social Democratic Party	120,329	2
Basel-Landschaft	7	160,760	71,589	Swiss People's Party	60,517	1
Basel-Landschaft	7	160,760	71,589	Christian Democratic People's Party	56,917	0
Basel-Landschaft	7	160,760	71,589	Green Party	54,220	1
Basel-Landschaft	7	160,760	71,589	Swiss Democrats	44,694	0
Basel-Landschaft	7	160,760	71,589	Swiss Motorists' Party	21,050	0
Basel-Landschaft	7	160,760	71,589	Evangelical People's Party	13,013	0
Basel-Stadt	6	131,353	59,079	Social Democratic Party	88,597	2
Basel-Stadt	6	131,353	59,079	Free Democratic Party	55,369	1
Basel-Stadt	6	131,353	59,079	Liberal Party	46,555	1
Basel-Stadt	6	131,353	59,079	Christian Democratic People's Party	36,318	1
Basel-Stadt	6	131,353	59,079	Progressive Organizations of Switzerland	27,155	0
Basel-Stadt	6	131,353	59,079	Ring of Independents	25,922	1
Basel-Stadt	6	131,353	59,079	Green Party	15,430	0
Basel-Stadt	6	131,353	59,079	Evangelical People's Party	11,445	0
Basel-Stadt	6	131,353	59,079	Swiss Democrats	11,325	0
Basel-Stadt	6	131,353	59,079	People's Action	10,200	0
Basel-Stadt	6	131,353	59,079	Swiss People's Party	6,964	0
Basel-Stadt	6	131,353	59,079	New Party of Labour and independent left	5,035	0
Basel-Stadt	6	131,353	59,079	Party of Labour Basel (founded in 1944)	3,911	0
Basel-Stadt	6	131,353	59,079	Federal Democratic Union	3,223	0
Basel-Stadt	6	131,353	59,079	Homosexual List	2,191	0
Basel-Stadt	6	131,353	59,079	Felix Brenner	598	0
Bern	29	682,991	315,533	Swiss People's Party	2,362,133	8
Bern	29	682,991	315,533	Social Democratic Party	1,791,161	6
Bern	29	682,991	315,533	Free Democratic Party	1,225,560	4
Bern	29	682,991	315,533	Green Party	887,110	4
Bern	29	682,991	315,533	Swiss Motorists' Party	613,974	2
Bern	29	682,991	315,533	Swiss Democrats	538,322	2
Bern	29	682,991	315,533	Christian Democratic People's Party	381,183	1
Bern	29	682,991	315,533	Federal Democratic Union	308,323	1
Bern	29	682,991	315,533	Evangelical People's Party	296,915	1
Bern	29	682,991	315,533	Ring of Independents	264,367	0
Bern	29	682,991	315,533	Swiss Progressive Organisations	179,444	0
Bern	29	682,991	315,533	Gray Panther	32,662	0
Bern	29	682,991	315,533	«deshalb»	26,246	0
Bern	29	682,991	315,533	Representatives of Low Income Earners	24,573	0
Bern	29	682,991	315,533	Women and Men's List	17,431	0
Bern	29	682,991	315,533	Progress Party	10,032	0
Bern	29	682,991	315,533	Citizens' List	9,584	0
Bern	29	682,991	315,533	Jörg Wilhelm Schmid	3,070	0
Fribourg	6	144,533	65,019	Christian Democratic People's Party	137,594	2
Fribourg	6	144,533	65,019	Social Democratic Party	69,528	1
Fribourg	6	144,533	65,019	Free Democratic Party	60,280	1
Fribourg	6	144,533	65,019	Democratic Social Party	36,184	1
Fribourg	6	144,533	65,019	Swiss People's Party	31,201	1
Fribourg	6	144,533	65,019	Independent Social-Christian Party	19,865	0
Fribourg	6	144,533	65,019	Green Party	15,868	0
Fribourg	6	144,533	65,019	Swiss Democrats	5,388	0
Geneva	11	200,607	79,539	Social Democratic Party	221,461	3
Geneva	11	200,607	79,539	Liberal Party	185,484	3
Geneva	11	200,607	79,539	Christian Democratic People's Party	121,621	2
Geneva	11	200,607	79,539	Free Democratic Party	107,687	1
Geneva	11	200,607	79,539	Party of Labour	65,307	1
Geneva	11	200,607	79,539	Green Party	56,376	1
Geneva	11	200,607	79,539	Swiss Motorists' Party	25,318	0
Geneva	11	200,607	79,539	Swiss Democrats	17,180	0
Geneva	11	200,607	79,539	Swiss People's Party	9,321	0
Geneva	11	200,607	79,539	Legalize Cannabis	7,082	0
Geneva	11	200,607	79,539	Patriotic Movement	5,958	0
Geneva	11	200,607	79,539	Appeal of 700	4,901	0
Geneva	11	200,607	79,539	Party Against Unfair Machinations	4,657	0
Geneva	11	200,607	79,539	For Politics That Favor Workers	3,262	0
Geneva	11	200,607	79,539	Independent Youth	2,884	0
Glarus	1	24,751	10,352	Social Democratic Party	5,482	1
Glarus	1	24,751	10,352	Swiss People's Party	4,369	0
Glarus	1	24,751	10,352	Others	359	0
Grisons	5	120,643	45,755	Christian Democratic People's Party	57,043	1
Grisons	5	120,643	45,755	Social Democratic Party	47,590	2
Grisons	5	120,643	45,755	Swiss People's Party	43,671	1
Grisons	5	120,643	45,755	Free Democratic Party	40,470	1
Grisons	5	120,643	45,755	Independent Social-Christian Party	15,513	0
Grisons	5	120,643	45,755	Swiss Progressive Organisations	9,549	0
Grisons	5	120,643	45,755	Youth '91	4,176	0
Grisons	5	120,643	45,755	Young Bündner	4,061	0
Grisons	5	120,643	45,755	Roveredo Independent Catholic Conservative Party	1,693	0
Jura	2	46,631	20,245	Christian Democratic People's Party	14,203	1
Jura	2	46,631	20,245	Free Democratic Party	13,846	1
Jura	2	46,631	20,245	Social Democratic Party	11,366	0
Lucerne	9	222,228	112,246	Christian Democratic People's Party	476,111	5
Lucerne	9	222,228	112,246	Free Democratic Party	272,792	2
Lucerne	9	222,228	112,246	Social Democratic Party	107,998	1
Lucerne	9	222,228	112,246	Green Party	90,908	1
Lucerne	9	222,228	112,246	Swiss Democrats	27,585	0
Lucerne	9	222,228	112,246	Siedürfen	3,898	0
Neuchâtel	5	102,814	39,155	Social Democratic Party	56,206	2
Neuchâtel	5	102,814	39,155	Liberal Party	51,046	2
Neuchâtel	5	102,814	39,155	Free Democratic Party	42,449	1
Neuchâtel	5	102,814	39,155	Green Party	15,085	0
Neuchâtel	5	102,814	39,155	Swiss Democrats	11,983	0
Neuchâtel	5	102,814	39,155	Party of Labour	9,840	0
Neuchâtel	5	102,814	39,155	For Politics That Favor Workers	2,040	0
Nidwalden	1	24,526	5,783	Christian Democratic People's Party	4,859	1
Nidwalden	1	24,526	5,783	Others	115	0
Obwalden	1	20,349	5,431	Christian Democratic People's Party	4,347	1
Obwalden	1	20,349	5,431	Others	215	0
Schaffhausen	2	48,445	33,408	Social Democratic Party	21,932	1
Schaffhausen	2	48,445	33,408	Free Democratic Party	18,342	1
Schaffhausen	2	48,445	33,408	Swiss People's Party	12,332	0
Schaffhausen	2	48,445	33,408	Swiss Motorists' Party	7,341	0
Schaffhausen	2	48,445	33,408	Swiss Progressive Organisations	2,508	0
Schaffhausen	2	48,445	33,408	Federal Democratic Union	1,766	0
Schwyz	3	76,046	30,792	Christian Democratic People's Party	29,401	1
Schwyz	3	76,046	30,792	Free Democratic Party	23,214	1
Schwyz	3	76,046	30,792	Social Democratic Party	17,354	1
Schwyz	3	76,046	30,792	Swiss People's Party	8,231	0
Schwyz	3	76,046	30,792	Party of the Future	5,721	0
Schwyz	3	76,046	30,792	Swiss Motorists' Party	5,309	0
Schwyz	3	76,046	30,792	Europe Party	387	0
Solothurn	7	160,145	89,787	Free Democratic Party	200,356	2
Solothurn	7	160,145	89,787	Christian Democratic People's Party	135,649	2
Solothurn	7	160,145	89,787	Social Democratic Party	121,034	1
Solothurn	7	160,145	89,787	Swiss Motorists' Party	55,578	1
Solothurn	7	160,145	89,787	Green Party	44,831	1
Solothurn	7	160,145	89,787	Progress Party	19,146	0
Solothurn	7	160,145	89,787	Ring of Independents	17,776	0
Solothurn	7	160,145	89,787	Evangelical People's Party	7,070	0
Solothurn	7	160,145	89,787	Free List of Non-Partisans	6,527	0
Solothurn	7	160,145	89,787	Party for Children and the Community	2,629	0
Solothurn	7	160,145	89,787	Europe Party	664	0
St. Gallen	12	257,455	112,230	Christian Democratic People's Party	499,051	5
St. Gallen	12	257,455	112,230	Free Democratic Party	278,873	2
St. Gallen	12	257,455	112,230	Social Democratic Party	182,304	2
St. Gallen	12	257,455	112,230	Swiss Motorists' Party	175,009	1
St. Gallen	12	257,455	112,230	Ring of Independents	129,263	1
St. Gallen	12	257,455	112,230	Green Party	86,647	1
St. Gallen	12	257,455	112,230	Swiss Democrats	42,642	0
Ticino	8	183,514	123,826	Free Democratic Party	281,966	3
Ticino	8	183,514	123,826	Christian Democratic People's Party	258,122	2
Ticino	8	183,514	123,826	Ticino League	225,445	2
Ticino	8	183,514	123,826	Autonomous Socialist Party	95,662	1
Ticino	8	183,514	123,826	Social Democratic Party	64,463	0
Ticino	8	183,514	123,826	Swiss People's Party	9,197	0
Ticino	8	183,514	123,826	Green Party	9,116	0
Ticino	8	183,514	123,826	Party of Labour	6,720	0
Ticino	8	183,514	123,826	Ecological and Political Turnaround	4,339	0
Ticino	8	183,514	123,826	Ticino Party for the Protection of Citizens	3,021	0
Thurgau	6	132,685	62,450	Swiss People's Party	87,792	2
Thurgau	6	132,685	62,450	Free Democratic Party	61,270	1
Thurgau	6	132,685	62,450	Christian Democratic People's Party	61,114	1
Thurgau	6	132,685	62,450	Social Democratic Party	56,114	1
Thurgau	6	132,685	62,450	Green Party	33,428	1
Thurgau	6	132,685	62,450	Swiss Motorists' Party	32,375	0
Thurgau	6	132,685	62,450	Swiss Democrats	12,860	0
Thurgau	6	132,685	62,450	Ring of Independents	12,090	0
Thurgau	6	132,685	62,450	Traders, Citizens and Farmers' Party	1,706	0
Uri	1	25,016	8,665	Free Democratic Party	7,413	1
Uri	1	25,016	8,665	Others	545	0
Vaud	17	355,264	133,024	Free Democratic Party	569,556	5
Vaud	17	355,264	133,024	Social Democratic Party	495,595	5
Vaud	17	355,264	133,024	Liberal Party	381,065	4
Vaud	17	355,264	133,024	Swiss People's Party	158,480	1
Vaud	17	355,264	133,024	Green Party	135,816	1
Vaud	17	355,264	133,024	Party of Labour	91,951	1
Vaud	17	355,264	133,024	Christian Democratic People's Party	76,854	0
Vaud	17	355,264	133,024	Swiss Progressive Organisations	76,827	0
Vaud	17	355,264	133,024	Swiss Democrats	62,116	0
Vaud	17	355,264	133,024	Swiss Motorists' Party	53,877	0
Vaud	17	355,264	133,024	RenouVaud Independent	19,746	0
Vaud	17	355,264	133,024	Call for 700	17,196	0
Vaud	17	355,264	133,024	Europe Party	12,993	0
Vaud	17	355,264	133,024	For Politics That Favor Workers	9,833	0
Valais	7	171,311	102,881	Christian Democratic People's Party	373,031	4
Valais	7	171,311	102,881	Free Democratic Party	177,665	2
Valais	7	171,311	102,881	Social Democratic Party	99,221	1
Valais	7	171,311	102,881	Liberal Party	26,928	0
Valais	7	171,311	102,881	Green Party	9,136	0
Zug	2	57,194	29,151	Christian Democratic People's Party	19,811	1
Zug	2	57,194	29,151	Free Democratic Party	19,043	1
Zug	2	57,194	29,151	Social Democratic Party	9,314	0
Zug	2	57,194	29,151	Swiss Progressive Organisations	5,870	0
Zug	2	57,194	29,151	"Women to Bern" Committee	3,906	0
Zürich	35	740,438	351,688	Swiss People's Party	2,463,161	8
Zürich	35	740,438	351,688	Social Democratic Party	2,295,980	7
Zürich	35	740,438	351,688	Free Democratic Party	2,279,936	7
Zürich	35	740,438	351,688	Green Party	855,903	2
Zürich	35	740,438	351,688	Ring of Independents	745,768	2
Zürich	35	740,438	351,688	Swiss Motorists' Party	724,670	2
Zürich	35	740,438	351,688	Christian Democratic People's Party	721,312	2
Zürich	35	740,438	351,688	Swiss Democrats	635,674	2
Zürich	35	740,438	351,688	Evangelical People's Party	583,486	2
Zürich	35	740,438	351,688	Federal Democratic Union	216,121	0
Zürich	35	740,438	351,688	Gray Panther	209,968	0
Zürich	35	740,438	351,688	Frauen macht Politik!	180,001	1
Zürich	35	740,438	351,688	Swiss Progressive Organisations	117,603	0
Zürich	35	740,438	351,688	Young Christians	34,978	0
Zürich	35	740,438	351,688	Europe Party	26,024	0
Zürich	35	740,438	351,688	Senior Citizens' List	25,349	0
Zürich	35	740,438	351,688	Discriminating Laws Against Men	19,147	0
Zürich	35	740,438	351,688	Zum Glück Beat Looser	17,109	0
Zürich	35	740,438	351,688	Natürli – ab Sächzgi	15,936	0
Zürich	35	740,438	351,688	Human Non-Partisan Movement	15,632	0
Zürich	35	740,438	351,688	THC 700	12,136	0
Zürich	35	740,438	351,688	Pro Pace Mundi	5,960	0
Zürich	35	740,438	351,688	Forum Utopie '92	5,319	0
Zürich	35	740,438	351,688	Young Tolerance	4,413	0
Zürich	35	740,438	351,688	Silent List	4,374	0
Zürich	35	740,438	351,688	Politics + Ethics	3,014	0
Source: Bundesblatt, 3 December 1991

=== Council of the States ===
Party	Seats	+/–
Free Democratic Party	18	+4
Christian Democratic People's Party	16	–3
Swiss People's Party	4	0
Social Democratic Party	3	–2
Liberal Party	3	0
Alliance of Independents	1	0
Ticino League	1	New
Total	46	0
Source: Nohlen & Stöver
