= Progressive Organizations of Switzerland =

Defunct political party in Switzerland

Progressive Organisations of Switzerland Progressive Organisationen der Schweiz Organisations progressistes de Suisse
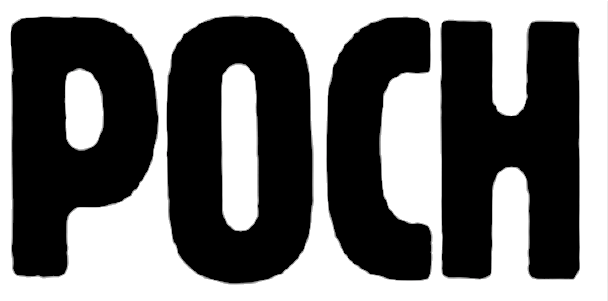
- Abbreviation: POCH
- Founded: 1969
- Dissolved: 1993
- Merged into: Green Party of Switzerland
- Ideology: Communism; Eco-socialism
- Political position: Far-left

The Progressive Organisations of Switzerland (POCH; German: Progressive Organisationen der Schweiz; French: Organisations progressistes de Suisse) was a communist party founded in 1969. Most of its members were from a university background.

== History of the POCH ==
In 1977, many women's groups split from the party to form the Organisation for the cause of women (German:Organisation für die Sache der Frau (OFRA)).

In 1987, the POCH distanced itself from Marxism-Leninism and changed its name to POCH-Grüne (POCH-Greens). For the election that year, the POCH ran candidates in all cantons except Basel-Stadt on the lists of Green Alternative within the framework of the Green Alliance.

After the disbandment of numerous canton parties between the late 1970s and 1993, many members changed their party affiliation to the Green Party of Switzerland.

The last section of the party in Basel-City disbanded in 1993, spawning the Basel's strong alternative (German: Basels starke Alternative) in 1995.

== Election results ==
=== National Council ===
Election year	Vote %	No. of seats won	+/–
1971	0.1	0 / 200	new
1975	1.0	0 / 200	Steady
1979	1.7	2 / 200	▲2
1983	2.2	3 / 200	▲1
1987	1.3	3 / 200	Steady
1991	0.2	0 / 147	▼3
Source: Federal Statistical Office

== See also ==
- Rotpunktverlag
