= 1983 Swiss federal election =

- 23 October 1983
- All 200 seats in the National Council (101 seats needed for a majority); All 46 seats in the Council of States (24 seats needed for a majority)
- Turnout: 48.9% ▲0.9 pp

Federal elections were held in Switzerland on 23 October 1983. The Free Democratic Party emerged as the largest party in the National Council, winning 54 of the 200 seats. It was the first time the Social Democratic Party had not received the most votes in a federal election since 1925.

The main issues included environmental protection and unemployment.

== Results ==
=== National Council ===
| Party | Votes | % | Seats | +/– |
|---|---|---|---|---|
| Free Democratic Party | 457,283 | 23.33 | 54 | +3 |
| Social Democratic Party | 447,634 | 22.84 | 47 | –4 |
| Christian Democratic People's Party | 396,281 | 20.22 | 42 | –2 |
| Swiss People's Party | 217,166 | 11.08 | 23 | 0 |
| Alliance of Independents | 78,292 | 3.99 | 8 | 0 |
| National Action | 57,592 | 2.94 | 4 | +2 |
| Liberal Party | 55,326 | 2.82 | 8 | 0 |
| Swiss Progressive Organisations | 43,694 | 2.23 | 3 | +1 |
| Evangelical People's Party | 40,837 | 2.08 | 3 | 0 |
| Federation of Swiss Green Parties | 37,079 | 1.89 | 3 | +2 |
| Feminist and Green Alternative Groups | 20,063 | 1.02 | 0 | 0 |
| Swiss Party of Labour | 17,488 | 0.89 | 1 | –2 |
| Republican Movement | 10,148 | 0.52 | 1 | 0 |
| Autonomous Socialist Party | 9,962 | 0.51 | 1 | 0 |
| Independent Social-Christian Party | 7,808 | 0.40 | 0 | New |
| Federal Democratic Union | 7,590 | 0.39 | 0 | 0 |
| Other parties | 55,599 | 2.84 | 2 | – |
| Total | 1,959,842 | 100.00 | 200 | 0 |
| Valid votes | 1,959,842 | 98.49 | | |
| Invalid/blank votes | 30,118 | 1.51 | | |
| Total votes | 1,989,960 | 100.00 | | |
| Registered voters/turnout | 4,068,940 | 48.91 | | |
Source: Nohlen & Stöver

==== By constituency ====
| Constituency | Seats | Electorate | Turnout | Party | Votes | Seats won |
|---|---|---|---|---|---|---|
| Aargau | 14 | 287,227 | 129,016 | Social Democratic Party | 489,381 | 4 |
| Aargau | 14 | 287,227 | 129,016 | Christian Democratic People's Party | 382,862 | 4 |
| Aargau | 14 | 287,227 | 129,016 | Free Democratic Party | 360,368 | 3 |
| Aargau | 14 | 287,227 | 129,016 | Swiss People's Party | 252,066 | 2 |
| Aargau | 14 | 287,227 | 129,016 | Ring of Independents | 105,223 | 1 |
| Aargau | 14 | 287,227 | 129,016 | Evangelical People's Party | 88,557 | 0 |
| Aargau | 14 | 287,227 | 129,016 | National Action | 71,119 | 0 |
| Aargau | 14 | 287,227 | 129,016 | Socialist Workers' Party | 21,609 | 0 |
| Aargau | 14 | 287,227 | 129,016 | More Freedom | 7,827 | 0 |
| Aargau | 14 | 287,227 | 129,016 | Social Liberal European Federalist Party | 2,453 | 0 |
| Appenzell Ausserrhoden | 2 | 31,463 | 13,025 | Free Democratic Party | 8,160 | 1 |
| Appenzell Ausserrhoden | 2 | 31,463 | 13,025 | "Herbert Maeder in the National Council" Committee | 5,856 | 1 |
| Appenzell Ausserrhoden | 2 | 31,463 | 13,025 | Social Democratic Party | 5,347 | 0 |
| Appenzell Ausserrhoden | 2 | 31,463 | 13,025 | Christian Democratic People's Party | 3,281 | 0 |
| Appenzell Innerrhoden | 1 | 8,702 | 2,132 | Christian Democratic People's Party | 1,950 | 1 |
| Appenzell Innerrhoden | 1 | 8,702 | 2,132 | Others | 90 | 0 |
| Basel-Landschaft | 7 | 143,229 | 70,557 | Social Democratic Party | 158,759 | 3 |
| Basel-Landschaft | 7 | 143,229 | 70,557 | Free Democratic Party | 122,193 | 2 |
| Basel-Landschaft | 7 | 143,229 | 70,557 | Swiss People's Party | 54,546 | 1 |
| Basel-Landschaft | 7 | 143,229 | 70,557 | Christian Democratic People's Party | 52,707 | 1 |
| Basel-Landschaft | 7 | 143,229 | 70,557 | Swiss Progressive Organisations | 35,206 | 0 |
| Basel-Landschaft | 7 | 143,229 | 70,557 | Ring of Independents | 21,379 | 0 |
| Basel-Landschaft | 7 | 143,229 | 70,557 | National Action | 19,110 | 0 |
| Basel-Landschaft | 7 | 143,229 | 70,557 | Feminist and Green Alternative Groups | 14,520 | 0 |
| Basel-Landschaft | 7 | 143,229 | 70,557 | Federation of Swiss Green Parties | 9,324 | 0 |
| Basel-Stadt | 6 | 137,296 | 62,694 | Social Democratic Party | 115,577 | 2 |
| Basel-Stadt | 6 | 137,296 | 62,694 | Free Democratic Party | 50,482 | 1 |
| Basel-Stadt | 6 | 137,296 | 62,694 | Swiss Progressive Organisations | 44,581 | 1 |
| Basel-Stadt | 6 | 137,296 | 62,694 | Christian Democratic People's Party | 36,952 | 1 |
| Basel-Stadt | 6 | 137,296 | 62,694 | Liberal Party | 31,040 | 0 |
| Basel-Stadt | 6 | 137,296 | 62,694 | Ring of Independents | 26,274 | 1 |
| Basel-Stadt | 6 | 137,296 | 62,694 | National Action | 19,790 | 0 |
| Basel-Stadt | 6 | 137,296 | 62,694 | Evangelical People's Party | 17,866 | 0 |
| Basel-Stadt | 6 | 137,296 | 62,694 | Democratic Social Party | 11,429 | 0 |
| Basel-Stadt | 6 | 137,296 | 62,694 | Party of Labour | 8,528 | 0 |
| Basel-Stadt | 6 | 137,296 | 62,694 | Feminist and Green Alternative Groups | 3,707 | 0 |
| Basel-Stadt | 6 | 137,296 | 62,694 | People's Action Against Many Foreigners In Our Home | 2,108 | 0 |
| Basel-Stadt | 6 | 137,296 | 62,694 | Green Action | 774 | 0 |
| Basel-Stadt | 6 | 137,296 | 62,694 | Basel Party for Calm, Order and Security | 771 | 0 |
| Bern | 29 | 625,995 | 312,288 | Swiss People's Party | 2,597,070 | 9 |
| Bern | 29 | 625,995 | 312,288 | Social Democratic Party | 2,529,138 | 8 |
| Bern | 29 | 625,995 | 312,288 | Free Democratic Party | 1,351,472 | 5 |
| Bern | 29 | 625,995 | 312,288 | National Action | 536,254 | 2 |
| Bern | 29 | 625,995 | 312,288 | Free List | 417,624 | 1 |
| Bern | 29 | 625,995 | 312,288 | Evangelical People's Party | 291,517 | 1 |
| Bern | 29 | 625,995 | 312,288 | Ring of Independents | 288,099 | 1 |
| Bern | 29 | 625,995 | 312,288 | Autonomous Socialist Party of South Jura | 192,669 | 0 |
| Bern | 29 | 625,995 | 312,288 | Christian Democratic People's Party | 191,536 | 0 |
| Bern | 29 | 625,995 | 312,288 | Federal Democratic Union | 162,341 | 0 |
| Bern | 29 | 625,995 | 312,288 | Feminist and Green Alternative Groups | 142,749 | 0 |
| Bern | 29 | 625,995 | 312,288 | Swiss Progressive Organisations | 142,651 | 1 |
| Bern | 29 | 625,995 | 312,288 | Federation of Swiss Green Parties | 57,759 | 0 |
| Bern | 29 | 625,995 | 312,288 | Socialist Workers' Party | 31,959 | 0 |
| Bern | 29 | 625,995 | 312,288 | Citizens' List Against the Accumulation of Offices | 11,326 | 0 |
| Bern | 29 | 625,995 | 312,288 | Social Liberal European Federalist Party | 4,678 | 0 |
| Fribourg | 6 | 122,666 | 64,746 | Christian Democratic People's Party | 143,535 | 3 |
| Fribourg | 6 | 122,666 | 64,746 | Social Democratic Party | 90,658 | 1 |
| Fribourg | 6 | 122,666 | 64,746 | Free Democratic Party | 75,556 | 1 |
| Fribourg | 6 | 122,666 | 64,746 | Swiss People's Party | 33,466 | 1 |
| Fribourg | 6 | 122,666 | 64,746 | Independent Social-Christian Party | 28,302 | 0 |
| Fribourg | 6 | 122,666 | 64,746 | Socialist Workers' Party | 6,561 | 0 |
| Geneva | 11 | 187,930 | 83,705 | Social Democratic Party | 172,453 | 2 |
| Geneva | 11 | 187,930 | 83,705 | Liberal Party | 171,576 | 3 |
| Geneva | 11 | 187,930 | 83,705 | Party of Labour | 85,219 | 2 |
| Geneva | 11 | 187,930 | 83,705 | Free Democratic Party | 145,144 | 2 |
| Geneva | 11 | 187,930 | 83,705 | Christian Democratic People's Party | 110,293 | 1 |
| Geneva | 11 | 187,930 | 83,705 | Republican Movement | 109,690 | 1 |
| Geneva | 11 | 187,930 | 83,705 | Federation of Swiss Green Parties | 68,431 | 0 |
| Geneva | 11 | 187,930 | 83,705 | National Action | 18,865 | 0 |
| Geneva | 11 | 187,930 | 83,705 | Socialist Workers' Party | 13,031 | 0 |
| Geneva | 11 | 187,930 | 83,705 | Social Liberal European Federalist Party | 2,588 | 0 |
| Glarus | 1 | 23,048 | 6,061 | Swiss People's Party | 5,045 | 1 |
| Glarus | 1 | 23,048 | 6,061 | Others | 420 | 0 |
| Grisons | 5 | 106,814 | 42,613 | Christian Democratic People's Party | 66,986 | 2 |
| Grisons | 5 | 106,814 | 42,613 | Social Democratic Party | 49,617 | 1 |
| Grisons | 5 | 106,814 | 42,613 | Swiss People's Party | 44,250 | 1 |
| Grisons | 5 | 106,814 | 42,613 | Free Democratic Party | 40,420 | 1 |
| Jura | 2 | 42,207 | 25,939 | Free Democratic Party | 14,808 | 1 |
| Jura | 2 | 42,207 | 25,939 | Christian Democratic People's Party | 12,896 | 0 |
| Jura | 2 | 42,207 | 25,939 | Social Democratic Party | 9,171 | 1 |
| Jura | 2 | 42,207 | 25,939 | Friends and Sympathizers of Jean Wilhelm | 7,475 | 0 |
| Jura | 2 | 42,207 | 25,939 | Independent Social-Christian Party | 6,052 | 0 |
| Jura | 2 | 42,207 | 25,939 | Swiss People's Party | 1,037 | 0 |
| Lucerne | 9 | 193,946 | 117,278 | Christian Democratic People's Party | 509,792 | 5 |
| Lucerne | 9 | 193,946 | 117,278 | Free Democratic Party | 293,937 | 3 |
| Lucerne | 9 | 193,946 | 117,278 | Social Democratic Party | 120,588 | 1 |
| Lucerne | 9 | 193,946 | 117,278 | Swiss Progressive Organisations | 86,399 | 0 |
| Lucerne | 9 | 193,946 | 117,278 | National Action | 13,255 | 0 |
| Lucerne | 9 | 193,946 | 117,278 | Non-Partisan | 3,350 | 0 |
| Neuchâtel | 5 | 97,581 | 42,674 | Social Democratic Party | 68,562 | 2 |
| Neuchâtel | 5 | 97,581 | 42,674 | Liberal Party | 63,991 | 2 |
| Neuchâtel | 5 | 97,581 | 42,674 | Free Democratic Party | 40,211 | 1 |
| Neuchâtel | 5 | 97,581 | 42,674 | Federation of Swiss Green Parties | 15,226 | 0 |
| Neuchâtel | 5 | 97,581 | 42,674 | Party of Labour | 8,739 | 0 |
| Neuchâtel | 5 | 97,581 | 42,674 | Ring of Independents | 7,257 | 0 |
| Neuchâtel | 5 | 97,581 | 42,674 | Socialist Workers' Party | 2,945 | 0 |
| Nidwalden | 1 | 20,439 | 6,027 | Christian Democratic People's Party | 4,166 | 1 |
| Nidwalden | 1 | 20,439 | 6,027 | Others | 122 | 0 |
| Obwalden | 1 | 17,378 | 5,370 | Christian Democratic People's Party | 3,415 | 1 |
| Obwalden | 1 | 17,378 | 5,370 | Others | 337 | 0 |
| Schaffhausen | 2 | 44,499 | 32,795 | Social Democratic Party | 22,431 | 1 |
| Schaffhausen | 2 | 44,499 | 32,795 | Free Democratic Party | 16,624 | 1 |
| Schaffhausen | 2 | 44,499 | 32,795 | Swiss People's Party | 14,375 | 0 |
| Schaffhausen | 2 | 44,499 | 32,795 | Christian Democratic People's Party | 4,023 | 0 |
| Schaffhausen | 2 | 44,499 | 32,795 | Ring of Independents | 3,550 | 0 |
| Schaffhausen | 2 | 44,499 | 32,795 | Swiss Progressive Organisations | 1,694 | 0 |
| Schaffhausen | 2 | 44,499 | 32,795 | Socialist Workers' Party | 766 | 0 |
| Schwyz | 3 | 63,068 | 27,491 | Christian Democratic People's Party | 37,267 | 2 |
| Schwyz | 3 | 63,068 | 27,491 | Free Democratic Party | 20,775 | 1 |
| Schwyz | 3 | 63,068 | 27,491 | Social Democratic Party | 16,812 | 0 |
| Schwyz | 3 | 63,068 | 27,491 | Swiss People's Party | 5,186 | 0 |
| Solothurn | 7 | 144,237 | 87,554 | Free Democratic Party | 223,530 | 3 |
| Solothurn | 7 | 144,237 | 87,554 | Social Democratic Party | 166,812 | 2 |
| Solothurn | 7 | 144,237 | 87,554 | Christian Democratic People's Party | 160,478 | 2 |
| Solothurn | 7 | 144,237 | 87,554 | Swiss Progressive Organisations | 20,781 | 0 |
| Solothurn | 7 | 144,237 | 87,554 | Ring of Independents | 23,832 | 0 |
| Solothurn | 7 | 144,237 | 87,554 | Socialist Workers' Party | 5,255 | 0 |
| St. Gallen | 12 | 244,526 | 107,611 | Christian Democratic People's Party | 520,398 | 5 |
| St. Gallen | 12 | 244,526 | 107,611 | Free Democratic Party | 350,297 | 4 |
| St. Gallen | 12 | 244,526 | 107,611 | Social Democratic Party | 207,455 | 2 |
| St. Gallen | 12 | 244,526 | 107,611 | Ring of Independents | 130,263 | 1 |
| St. Gallen | 12 | 244,526 | 107,611 | Feminist and Green Alternative Groups | 41,558 | 0 |
| St. Gallen | 12 | 244,526 | 107,611 | Swiss People's Party | 24,021 | 0 |
| Ticino | 8 | 159,845 | 98,398 | Free Democratic Party | 285,420 | 3 |
| Ticino | 8 | 159,845 | 98,398 | Christian Democratic People's Party | 255,684 | 3 |
| Ticino | 8 | 159,845 | 98,398 | Social Democratic Party | 103,631 | 1 |
| Ticino | 8 | 159,845 | 98,398 | Autonomous Socialist Party | 79,454 | 1 |
| Ticino | 8 | 159,845 | 98,398 | Swiss People's Party | 15,702 | 0 |
| Ticino | 8 | 159,845 | 98,398 | Socialist Workers' Party | 7,435 | 0 |
| Ticino | 8 | 159,845 | 98,398 | Ticino Democratic Rights | 3,091 | 0 |
| Ticino | 8 | 159,845 | 98,398 | Social Liberal European Federalist Party | 2,717 | 0 |
| Thurgau | 6 | 113,263 | 59,712 | Swiss People's Party | 80,381 | 2 |
| Thurgau | 6 | 113,263 | 59,712 | Christian Democratic People's Party | 76,133 | 2 |
| Thurgau | 6 | 113,263 | 59,712 | Social Democratic Party | 68,735 | 1 |
| Thurgau | 6 | 113,263 | 59,712 | Free Democratic Party | 64,444 | 1 |
| Thurgau | 6 | 113,263 | 59,712 | Federation of Swiss Green Parties | 20,785 | 0 |
| Thurgau | 6 | 113,263 | 59,712 | Evangelical People's Party | 18,504 | 0 |
| Thurgau | 6 | 113,263 | 59,712 | Ring of Independents | 13,768 | 0 |
| Thurgau | 6 | 113,263 | 59,712 | National Action | 9,609 | 0 |
| Uri | 1 | 22,440 | 6,772 | Free Democratic Party | 4,799 | 1 |
| Uri | 1 | 22,440 | 6,772 | Others | 868 | 0 |
| Vaud | 17 | 320,472 | 128,894 | Free Democratic Party | 650,061 | 7 |
| Vaud | 17 | 320,472 | 128,894 | Social Democratic Party | 467,069 | 5 |
| Vaud | 17 | 320,472 | 128,894 | Liberal Party | 360,481 | 3 |
| Vaud | 17 | 320,472 | 128,894 | Federation of Swiss Green Parties | 150,149 | 1 |
| Vaud | 17 | 320,472 | 128,894 | Swiss People's Party | 131,952 | 1 |
| Vaud | 17 | 320,472 | 128,894 | Christian Democratic People's Party | 96,697 | 0 |
| Vaud | 17 | 320,472 | 128,894 | Party of Labour | 88,607 | 0 |
| Vaud | 17 | 320,472 | 128,894 | Feminist and Green Alternative Groups | 80,816 | 0 |
| Vaud | 17 | 320,472 | 128,894 | National Action | 55,162 | |
| Vaud | 17 | 320,472 | 128,894 | Socialist Workers' Party | 45,173 | 0 |
| Vaud | 17 | 320,472 | 128,894 | Social Liberal European Federalist Party | 10,851 | 0 |
| Valais | 7 | 145,446 | 94,937 | Christian Democratic People's Party | 371,921 | 4 |
| Valais | 7 | 145,446 | 94,937 | Free Democratic Party | 162,477 | 2 |
| Valais | 7 | 145,446 | 94,937 | Social Democratic Party | 91,323 | 1 |
| Valais | 7 | 145,446 | 94,937 | Democratic Valais Independent Group | 20,853 | 0 |
| Zug | 2 | 47,815 | 25,464 | Christian Democratic People's Party | 20,127 | 1 |
| Zug | 2 | 47,815 | 25,464 | Free Democratic Party | 16,938 | 1 |
| Zug | 2 | 47,815 | 25,464 | Social Democratic Party | 11,841 | 0 |
| Zug | 2 | 47,815 | 25,464 | Socialist Workers' Party | 1,309 | 0 |
| Zug | 2 | 47,815 | 25,464 | Joy, Peace and Zwätschgechueche | 603 | 0 |
| Zürich | 35 | 717,000 | 336,259 | Social Democratic Party | 2,679,690 | 8 |
| Zürich | 35 | 717,000 | 336,259 | Free Democratic Party | 2,537,519 | 9 |
| Zürich | 35 | 717,000 | 336,259 | Swiss People's Party | 1,612,538 | 5 |
| Zürich | 35 | 717,000 | 336,259 | Ring of Independents | 1,157,817 | 4 |
| Zürich | 35 | 717,000 | 336,259 | Christian Democratic People's Party | 1,058,175 | 3 |
| Zürich | 35 | 717,000 | 336,259 | National Action | 682,087 | 2 |
| Zürich | 35 | 717,000 | 336,259 | Evangelical People's Party | 632,813 | 2 |
| Zürich | 35 | 717,000 | 336,259 | Federation of Swiss Green Parties | 484,533 | 1 |
| Zürich | 35 | 717,000 | 336,259 | Swiss Progressive Organisations | 442,017 | 1 |
| Zürich | 35 | 717,000 | 336,259 | Feminist and Green Alternative Groups | 79,972 | 0 |
| Zürich | 35 | 717,000 | 336,259 | Federal Democratic Union | 67,437 | 0 |
| Zürich | 35 | 717,000 | 336,259 | Socialist Workers' Party | 48,100 | 0 |
| Zürich | 35 | 717,000 | 336,259 | Party of Labour | 40,355 | 0 |
| Zürich | 35 | 717,000 | 336,259 | Non-Partisan List | 26,915 | 0 |
| Zürich | 35 | 717,000 | 336,259 | Senior Citizens' List of the Canton of Zürich | 20,673 | 0 |
| Zürich | 35 | 717,000 | 336,259 | Social Liberal European Federalist Party | 21,058 | 0 |
| Zürich | 35 | 717,000 | 336,259 | Life + Justice | 17,618 | 0 |
Source: Bundesblatt, 29 November 1983

=== Council of the States ===
| Party | Seats | +/– |
|---|---|---|
| Christian Democratic People's Party | 18 | 0 |
| Free Democratic Party | 14 | +3 |
| Social Democratic Party | 6 | –3 |
| Swiss People's Party | 5 | 0 |
| Liberal Party | 3 | 0 |
| Alliance of Independents | 0 | 0 |
| Total | 46 | 0 |
Source: Nohlen & Stöver
