= 1975 Swiss federal election =

Federal elections were held in Switzerland on 26 October 1975. The Social Democratic Party emerged as the largest party in the National Council, winning 55 of the 200 seats. As of 2023, this is the last time turnout has reached 50% in a federal election.

== Results ==
=== National Council ===
Party	Votes	%	Seats	+/–
Social Democratic Party	480,396	24.87	55	+9
Free Democratic Party	428,919	22.21	47	–2
Christian Democratic People's Party	407,286	21.09	46	+2
Swiss People's Party	192,053	9.94	21	–2
Alliance of Independents	117,217	6.07	11	–2
Republican Movement	57,192	2.96	4	–3
National Action	47,796	2.47	2	–2
Liberal Democratic Union	47,256	2.45	6	0
Swiss Party of Labour	45,799	2.37	4	–1
Evangelical People's Party	37,959	1.97	3	0
Swiss Progressive Organisations	19,173	0.99	0	0
Federal Democratic Union	6,717	0.35	0	–
Autonomous Socialist Party	6,706	0.35	1	+1
Independent Social-Christian Party	2,883	0.15	0	0
Vaud People's Movement for the Environment	1,246	0.06	0	–
Other parties	32,789	1.70	0	–
Total	1,931,387	100.00	200	0
Valid votes	1,931,387	98.75		
Invalid/blank votes	24,353	1.25		
Total votes	1,955,740	100.00		
Registered voters/turnout	3,735,037	52.36		
Source: Nohlen & Stöver

==== By constituency ====
Constituency	Seats	Electorate	Turnout	Party	Votes	Seats won
Aargau	14	250,690	127,016	Social Democratic Party	425,626	4
Aargau	14	250,690	127,016	Christian Democratic People's Party	362,737	3
Aargau	14	250,690	127,016	Free Democratic Party	310,099	3
Aargau	14	250,690	127,016	Swiss People's Party	224,317	2
Aargau	14	250,690	127,016	Ring of Independents	116,355	1
Aargau	14	250,690	127,016	Republican Movement	114,327	1
Aargau	14	250,690	127,016	Evangelical People's Party	81,418	0
Aargau	14	250,690	127,016	National Action	61,001	0
Aargau	14	250,690	127,016	Team 67	34,740	0
Aargau	14	250,690	127,016	Revolutionary Marxist League	10,054	0
Aargau	14	250,690	127,016	Swiss Progressive Organisations	9,842	0
Aargau	14	250,690	127,016	League for the Protection of Living Space and Quality of Life	5,871	0
Appenzell Ausserrhoden	2	29,485	13,020	Free Democratic Party	11,162	1
Appenzell Ausserrhoden	2	29,485	13,020	Social Democratic Party	9,771	1
Appenzell Ausserrhoden	2	29,485	13,020	Christian Democratic People's Party	3,431	0
Appenzell Innerrhoden	1	7,817	2,310	Christian Democratic People's Party	2,215	1
Basel-Landschaft	7	125,994	60,885	Social Democratic Party	128,040	2
Basel-Landschaft	7	125,994	60,885	Free Democratic Party	101,186	2
Basel-Landschaft	7	125,994	60,885	Christian Democratic People's Party	56,044	1
Basel-Landschaft	7	125,994	60,885	Ring of Independents	47,318	1
Basel-Landschaft	7	125,994	60,885	Swiss People's Party	44,991	1
Basel-Landschaft	7	125,994	60,885	National Action	23,575	0
Basel-Landschaft	7	125,994	60,885	Swiss Progressive Organisations	13,955	0
Basel-Landschaft	7	125,994	60,885	Party of Labour	7,517	0
Basel-Stadt	7	141,727	62,009	Social Democratic Party	143,994	3
Basel-Stadt	7	141,727	62,009	Christian Democratic People's Party	52,180	1
Basel-Stadt	7	141,727	62,009	Liberal Party	49,989	1
Basel-Stadt	7	141,727	62,009	Free Democratic Party	49,111	1
Basel-Stadt	7	141,727	62,009	Ring of Independents	42,659	1
Basel-Stadt	7	141,727	62,009	National Action	35,270	0
Basel-Stadt	7	141,727	62,009	Party of Labour	19,948	0
Basel-Stadt	7	141,727	62,009	Swiss Progressive Organisations	18,263	0
Basel-Stadt	7	141,727	62,009	Evangelical People's Party	17,164	0
Basel-Stadt	7	141,727	62,009	League for the Protection of Living Space and Quality of Life	1,469	0
Basel-Stadt	7	141,727	62,009	Revolutionary Marxist League	1,331	0
Basel-Stadt	7	141,727	62,009	Interest Group for Swiss Workers	442	0
Bern	31	621,787	337,852	Social Democratic Party	3,201,703	11
Bern	31	621,787	337,852	Swiss People's Party	2,799,584	10
Bern	31	621,787	337,852	Free Democratic Party	1,820,573	6
Bern	31	621,787	337,852	Christian Democratic People's Party	546,802	1
Bern	31	621,787	337,852	Ring of Independents	488,260	1
Bern	31	621,787	337,852	Evangelical People's Party	356,708	1
Bern	31	621,787	337,852	National Action	349,086	1
Bern	31	621,787	337,852	Republican Movement	246,808	0
Bern	31	621,787	337,852	Unité Jurassienne	189,346	0
Bern	31	621,787	337,852	Federal Democratic Union	111,411	0
Bern	31	621,787	337,852	Independent Social-Christian Party	88,568	0
Bern	31	621,787	337,852	Party of Labour	65,427	0
Bern	31	621,787	337,852	Swiss Progressive Organisations	47,740	0
Bern	31	621,787	337,852	Revolutionary Marxist League	16,505	0
Fribourg	6	110,279	52,557	Christian Democratic People's Party	144,411	3
Fribourg	6	110,279	52,557	Social Democratic Party	79,215	2
Fribourg	6	110,279	52,557	Free Democratic Party	68,083	1
Fribourg	6	110,279	52,557	Swiss People's Party	13,175	0
Fribourg	6	110,279	52,557	Socio-Ecological People's Movement	1,972	0
Fribourg	6	110,279	52,557	Revolutionary Marxist League	1,055	0
Geneva	11	177,047	80,338	Social Democratic Party	195,666	3
Geneva	11	177,047	80,338	Party of Labour	155,261	2
Geneva	11	177,047	80,338	Free Democratic Party	143,434	2
Geneva	11	177,047	80,338	Liberal Party	138,454	2
Geneva	11	177,047	80,338	Christian Democratic People's Party	126,622	1
Geneva	11	177,047	80,338	Vigilance	59,838	1
Geneva	11	177,047	80,338	Ring of Independents	20,728	0
Geneva	11	177,047	80,338	National Action	14,543	0
Geneva	11	177,047	80,338	Revolutionary Marxist League	9,373	0
Glarus	1	22,277	7,434	Social Democratic Party	4,554	1
Glarus	1	22,277	7,434	Action for Real Elections	1,659	0
Grisons	5	95,389	47,340	Christian Democratic People's Party	83,395	2
Grisons	5	95,389	47,340	Swiss People's Party	62,551	1
Grisons	5	95,389	47,340	Free Democratic Party	42,067	1
Grisons	5	95,389	47,340	Social Democratic Party	35,384	1
Grisons	5	95,389	47,340	National Action	8,180	0
Grisons	5	95,389	47,340	Liberal Movement	685	0
Lucerne	9	173,714	110,968	Christian Democratic People's Party	492,254	5
Lucerne	9	173,714	110,968	Free Democratic Party	285,562	3
Lucerne	9	173,714	110,968	Social Democratic Party	131,826	1
Lucerne	9	173,714	110,968	Ring of Independents	51,653	0
Lucerne	9	173,714	110,968	Swiss Progressive Organisations	17,285	0
Lucerne	9	173,714	110,968	Revolutionary Marxist League	3,454	0
Neuchâtel	5	96,482	45,585	Social Democratic Party	86,051	2
Neuchâtel	5	96,482	45,585	Free Democratic Party	49,586	2
Neuchâtel	5	96,482	45,585	Liberal Party	48,935	1
Neuchâtel	5	96,482	45,585	Party of Labour	21,777	0
Neuchâtel	5	96,482	45,585	Progressive National Party	12,122	0
Neuchâtel	5	96,482	45,585	Revolutionary Marxist League	3,001	0
Nidwalden	1	16,600	6,455	Christian Democratic People's Party	5,240	1
Obwalden	1	15,213	3,222	Christian Democratic People's Party	2,668	1
Schaffhausen	2	42,032	31,139	Free Democratic Party	23,693	1
Schaffhausen	2	42,032	31,139	Social Democratic Party	21,978	1
Schaffhausen	2	42,032	31,139	Ring of Independents	9,832	0
Schaffhausen	2	42,032	31,139	Swiss Progressive Organisations	3,614	0
Schwyz	3	54,425	29,016	Christian Democratic People's Party	38,795	2
Schwyz	3	54,425	29,016	Social Democratic Party	24,537	1
Schwyz	3	54,425	29,016	Free Democratic Party	17,796	0
Schwyz	3	54,425	29,016	Swiss People's Party	2,541	0
Solothurn	7	133,245	85,667	Free Democratic Party	227,387	3
Solothurn	7	133,245	85,667	Social Democratic Party	184,312	2
Solothurn	7	133,245	85,667	Christian Democratic People's Party	152,623	2
Solothurn	7	133,245	85,667	Swiss Progressive Organisations	20,002	0
Solothurn	7	133,245	85,667	Revolutionary Marxist League	3,465	0
St. Gallen	12	222,338	118,882	Christian Democratic People's Party	608,805	6
St. Gallen	12	222,338	118,882	Free Democratic Party	352,753	3
St. Gallen	12	222,338	118,882	Social Democratic Party	212,249	2
St. Gallen	12	222,338	118,882	Ring of Independents	112,850	1
St. Gallen	12	222,338	118,882	Republican Movement	75,384	0
St. Gallen	12	222,338	118,882	National Action	30,300	0
St. Gallen	12	222,338	118,882	Swiss Progressive Organisations	6,979	0
St. Gallen	12	222,338	118,882	Party of Labour	5,791	0
Ticino	8	141,564	91,281	Free Democratic Party	275,594	3
Ticino	8	141,564	91,281	Christian Democratic People's Party	251,299	3
Ticino	8	141,564	91,281	Social Democratic Party	97,672	1
Ticino	8	141,564	91,281	Autonomous Socialist Party	53,474	1
Ticino	8	141,564	91,281	Party of Labour	25,099	0
Ticino	8	141,564	91,281	Ticino Democratic Rights	1,666	0
Thurgau	6	101,617	57,555	Swiss People's Party	85,358	2
Thurgau	6	101,617	57,555	Christian Democratic People's Party	75,767	2
Thurgau	6	101,617	57,555	Social Democratic Party	73,350	1
Thurgau	6	101,617	57,555	Free Democratic Party	49,054	1
Thurgau	6	101,617	57,555	Republican Movement	25,719	0
Thurgau	6	101,617	57,555	Ring of Independents	22,476	0
Thurgau	6	101,617	57,555	National Action	8,397	0
Uri	1	20,704	9,785	Free Democratic Party	6,519	1
Uri	1	20,704	9,785	Christian Democratic People's Party	1,596	0
Vaud	16	299,846	130,485	Social Democratic Party	562,139	5
Vaud	16	299,846	130,485	Free Democratic Party	522,416	5
Vaud	16	299,846	130,485	Liberal Party	277,595	2
Vaud	16	299,846	130,485	Party of Labour	217,472	2
Vaud	16	299,846	130,485	Swiss People's Party	163,959	1
Vaud	16	299,846	130,485	National Action	96,007	0
Vaud	16	299,846	130,485	Christian Democratic People's Party	94,074	1
Vaud	16	299,846	130,485	Revolutionary Marxist League	32,213	0
Vaud	16	299,846	130,485	Ring of Independents	31,758	0
Vaud	16	299,846	130,485	Republican Movement	21,245	0
Vaud	16	299,846	130,485	Vaud People's Movement for the Environment	19,803	0
Valais	7	128,056	85,263	Christian Democratic People's Party	349,366	5
Valais	7	128,056	85,263	Social Democratic Party	101,895	1
Valais	7	128,056	85,263	Free Democratic Party	110,273	1
Valais	7	128,056	85,263	Movement for Democracy and Progress	23,273	0
Zug	2	40,584	23,901	Christian Democratic People's Party	18,620	1
Zug	2	40,584	23,901	Social Democratic Party	16,858	1
Zug	2	40,584	23,901	Free Democratic Party	10,934	0
Zug	2	40,584	23,901	Revolutionary Marxist League	864	0
Zürich	35	664,201	335,787	Social Democratic Party	2,781,707	9
Zürich	35	664,201	335,787	Free Democratic Party	2,144,524	7
Zürich	35	664,201	335,787	Ring of Independents	1,811,587	6
Zürich	35	664,201	335,787	Swiss People's Party	1,318,112	4
Zürich	35	664,201	335,787	Christian Democratic People's Party	1,089,140	4
Zürich	35	664,201	335,787	Republican Movement	720,884	2
Zürich	35	664,201	335,787	Evangelical People's Party	625,227	2
Zürich	35	664,201	335,787	National Action	507,637	1
Zürich	35	664,201	335,787	Swiss Progressive Organisations	177,032	0
Zürich	35	664,201	335,787	Party of Labour	127,893	0
Zürich	35	664,201	335,787	Politically Interested Women	89,584	0
Zürich	35	664,201	335,787	Federal Democratic Union	60,733	0
Zürich	35	664,201	335,787	League for the Protection of Living Space and Quality of Life	48,109	0
Zürich	35	664,201	335,787	Liberal Socialist and Free Citizens	38,390	0
Zürich	35	664,201	335,787	New Democratic Movement	30,415	0
Zürich	35	664,201	335,787	Revolutionary Marxist League	23,743	0
Zürich	35	664,201	335,787	Free Zürich Citizens	13,994	0
Zürich	35	664,201	335,787	European Federalist Party	10,498	0
Source: Bundesblatt, 1 December 1975

=== Council of the States ===
Party	Seats	+/–
Christian Democratic People's Party	17	0
Free Democratic Party	15	0
Swiss People's Party	5	0
Social Democratic Party	5	+1
Liberal Democratic Union	1	–1
Alliance of Independents	1	0
Total	44	0
Source: Nohlen & Stöver
