= Republican Movement (Switzerland) =

Defunct political party in Switzerland

The Republican Movement (French: Mouvement républicain; German: Republikanische Bewegung) was a political party in Switzerland between 1971 and 1989.

== History ==
The party was formed by James Schwarzenbach as a breakaway from the National Action against the Infiltration of People and Homeland party in 1971. It received 4.3% of the vote in the elections that year, winning seven seats. However, in the 1975 elections the party's share of the vote fell to 3% and it was reduced to four seats. The 1979 elections saw the party lose the majority of its support as it was reduced to 0.6% of the vote and won only one seat. It saw another fall in its vote share to 0.5% in the 1983 elections, but retained its single seat. In 1987 its vote share fell to just 0.3% and it lost its only seat. The party was subsequently dissolved on 22 April 1989. Most of its members joined the Federal Democratic Union.

== Platform ==
The Republican Movement supported anti-immigrant and anti-establishment policies, as well as fundamentalist Protestant Christian views.

== Affiliations ==
In 1972 the Republican Movement officially associated itself with the anti-immigrant Vigilance, which was founded in 1964 and based in the Canton of Geneva. They presented themselves as an electoral alliance three years later.

== Election results ==
=== Federal Assembly ===
Election	Votes	%	Rank	Seats
1967	1,696	0.17%	11	0
1971	84,700	4.25%	6	7
1975	57,192	2.96%	6	4
1979	11,587	0.63%	11	1
1987	6,769	0.35%	15	0

== Bibliography ==
- Skenderovic, Damir (2009). The radical right in Switzerland: continuity and change, 1945-2000. Berghahn Books. ISBN 978-1-84545-580-4.
