= 1967 Swiss federal election =

Federal elections were held in Switzerland on 29 October 1967. The Social Democratic Party remained the largest party in the National Council, winning 50 of the 200 seats.

== Results ==
=== National Council ===
Party	Votes	%	Seats	+/–
Social Democratic Party	233,873	23.53	50	–3
Free Democratic Party	230,095	23.15	49	–2
Conservative Christian Social Party	219,184	22.05	45	–3
Party of Farmers, Traders and Independents	109,621	11.03	21	–1
Alliance of Independents	89,950	9.05	16	+6
Swiss Party of Labour	28,723	2.89	5	+1
Liberal Democratic Union	23,208	2.34	6	0
Evangelical People's Party	15,728	1.58	3	+1
Social-Political Group	14,270	1.44	3	–1
National Action	6,275	0.63	1	New
Republican Movement	1,696	0.17	0	–
Dellberg List	21,225	2.14	1	–
Other parties	21,225	2.14	0	–
Total	993,848	100.00	200	0
Valid votes	993,848	97.44		
Invalid/blank votes	26,059	2.56		
Total votes	1,019,907	100.00		
Registered voters/turnout	1,551,909	65.72		
Source: Nohlen & Stöver, IPU

==== By constituency ====
Constituency	Seats	Electorate	Turnout	Party	Votes	Seats won
Aargau	13	104,829	83,116	Social Democratic Party	290,697	4
Aargau	13	104,829	83,116	Conservative People's Party	208,247	3
Aargau	13	104,829	83,116	Free Democratic Party	158,625	2
Aargau	13	104,829	83,116	Party of Farmers, Traders and Independents	150,840	2
Aargau	13	104,829	83,116	Ring of Independents	120,330	2
Aargau	13	104,829	83,116	Team 67	41,383	0
Aargau	13	104,829	83,116	Evangelical People's Party	27,377	0
Aargau	13	104,829	83,116	Free Eligible Voters and Non-Partisan Voters	27,350	0
Aargau	13	104,829	83,116	Christian Democratic People's Party	3,887	0
Appenzell Ausserrhoden	2	Elected unopposed		Free Democratic Party		1
Appenzell Ausserrhoden	2	Elected unopposed		Social Democratic Party		1
Appenzell Innerrhoden	1	3,734	1,148	Conservative Christian Social Party	1,017	1
Basel-Landschaft	5	48,000	29,202	Social Democratic Party	47,790	2
Basel-Landschaft	5	48,000	29,202	Free Democratic Party	32,869	1
Basel-Landschaft	5	48,000	29,202	Party of Farmers, Traders and Independents	20,991	1
Basel-Landschaft	5	48,000	29,202	Conservative Christian Social Party	19,945	1
Basel-Landschaft	5	48,000	29,202	Ring of Independents	15,601	0
Basel-Landschaft	5	48,000	29,202	Aktion Kanton Basel	7,270	0
Basel-Stadt	8	66,719	33,441	Social Democratic Party	77,742	3
Basel-Stadt	8	66,719	33,441	Free Democratic Party	44,320	2
Basel-Stadt	8	66,719	33,441	Liberal Party	44,055	1
Basel-Stadt	8	66,719	33,441	Ring of Independents	41,469	1
Basel-Stadt	8	66,719	33,441	Conservative Christian Social Party	31,475	1
Basel-Stadt	8	66,719	33,441	Party of Labour	17,952	0
Basel-Stadt	8	66,719	33,441	National Action	6,195	0
Bern	33	272,491	177,071	Social Democratic Party	1,960,707	12
Bern	33	272,491	177,071	Party of Farmers, Traders and Independents	1,757,217	10
Bern	33	272,491	177,071	Free Democratic Party	991,205	6
Bern	33	272,491	177,071	Conservative Christian Social Party	361,283	2
Bern	33	272,491	177,071	Ring of Independents	423,464	2
Bern	33	272,491	177,071	Evangelical People's Party	160,342	1
Bern	33	272,491	177,071	Liberal Free Independent Party	36,101	0
Fribourg	6	49,699	34,441	Conservative Christian Social Party	96,916	3
Fribourg	6	49,699	34,441	Free Democratic Party	51,856	2
Fribourg	6	49,699	34,441	Social Democratic Party	36,145	1
Fribourg	6	49,699	34,441	Party of Farmers, Traders and Independents	18,408	0
Geneva	10	73,400	36,324	Party of Labour	74,543	2
Geneva	10	73,400	36,324	Free Democratic Party	66,178	2
Geneva	10	73,400	36,324	Social Democratic Party	57,056	2
Geneva	10	73,400	36,324	Conservative Christian Social Party	49,697	1
Geneva	10	73,400	36,324	Liberal Party	49,383	2
Geneva	10	73,400	36,324	Ring of Independents	43,373	1
Geneva	10	73,400	36,324	Vigilance	16,955	0
Glarus	2	Elected unopposed		Social Democratic Party		1
Glarus	2	Elected unopposed		Free Democratic Party		1
Grisons	5	40,967	27,317	Conservative Christian Social Party	53,634	2
Grisons	5	40,967	27,317	Social-Political Group	44,208	2
Grisons	5	40,967	27,317	Free Democratic Party	19,892	1
Grisons	5	40,967	27,317	Social Democratic Party	14,944	0
Lucerne	9	75,840	62,859	Conservative Christian Social Party	271,313	5
Lucerne	9	75,840	62,859	Free Democratic Party	188,692	3
Lucerne	9	75,840	62,859	Social Democratic Party	51,065	1
Lucerne	9	75,840	62,859	Ring of Independents	46,618	0
Neuchâtel	5	42,811	24,200	Social Democratic Party	40,801	2
Neuchâtel	5	42,811	24,200	Free Democratic Party	27,684	1
Neuchâtel	5	42,811	24,200	Liberal Party	27,003	1
Neuchâtel	5	42,811	24,200	Party of Labour	22,841	1
Nidwalden	1	6,675	5,195	Conservative Christian Social Party	4,965	1
Obwalden	1	6,757	1,776	Conservative Christian Social Party	1,534	1
Schaffhausen	2	18,643	15,935	Social Democratic Party	12,596	1
Schaffhausen	2	18,643	15,935	Free Democratic Party	12,063	1
Schaffhausen	2	18,643	15,935	Ring of Independents	5,303	0
Schwyz	3	Elected unopposed		Conservative Christian Social Party		1
Schwyz	3	Elected unopposed		Social Democratic Party		1
Schwyz	3	Elected unopposed		Free Democratic Party		1
Solothurn	7	58,799	47,603	Free Democratic Party	143,706	3
Solothurn	7	58,799	47,603	Social Democratic Party	97,647	2
Solothurn	7	58,799	47,603	Conservative Christian Social Party	81,870	2
Solothurn	7	58,799	47,603	Non-partisan	359	0
St. Gallen	13	93,551	66,585	Conservative Christian Social Party	393,503	6
St. Gallen	13	93,551	66,585	Free Democratic Party	231,531	4
St. Gallen	13	93,551	66,585	Social Democratic Party	138,443	2
St. Gallen	13	93,551	66,585	Ring of Independents	59,944	1
Ticino	7	56,940	39,187	Free Democratic Party	108,954	3
Ticino	7	56,940	39,187	Conservative Christian Social Party	98,369	3
Ticino	7	56,940	39,187	Social Democratic Party	41,706	1
Ticino	7	56,940	39,187	Party of Labour	9,463	0
Ticino	7	56,940	39,187	Party of Farmers, Traders and Independents	7,215	0
Thurgau	6	45,194	32,040	Social Democratic Party	51,528	2
Thurgau	6	45,194	32,040	Conservative Christian Social Party	50,079	1
Thurgau	6	45,194	32,040	Party of Farmers, Traders and Independents	45,544	2
Thurgau	6	45,194	32,040	Free Democratic Party	40,594	1
Uri	1	9,274	5,136	Free Democratic Party	4,010	1
Vaud	16	127,554	59,084	Free Democratic Party	296,969	6
Vaud	16	127,554	59,084	Social Democratic Party	242,465	4
Vaud	16	127,554	59,084	Party of Labour	133,267	2
Vaud	16	127,554	59,084	Liberal Party	117,894	2
Vaud	16	127,554	59,084	Party of Farmers, Traders and Independents	81,225	1
Vaud	16	127,554	59,084	Conservative Christian Social Party	43,960	1
Vaud	16	127,554	59,084	Romand Unitary Party	14,423	0
Valais	7	55,021	44,009	Conservative Christian Social Party	176,525	5
Valais	7	55,021	44,009	Free Democratic Party	55,867	1
Valais	7	55,021	44,009	Dellberg List	35,740	1
Valais	7	55,021	44,009	Social Democratic Party	22,423	0
Valais	7	55,021	44,009	Social Independent Movement	9,878	0
Valais	7	55,021	44,009	Ring of Independents	4,263	0
Zug	2	15,742	9,171	Conservative Christian Social Party	8,604	1
Zug	2	15,742	9,171	Free Democratic Party	8,284	1
Zürich	35	279,672	185,375	Ring of Independents	1,472,255	9
Zürich	35	279,672	185,375	Social Democratic Party	1,421,001	8
Zürich	35	279,672	185,375	Free Democratic Party	948,783	5
Zürich	35	279,672	185,375	Party of Farmers, Traders and Independents	831,018	5
Zürich	35	279,672	185,375	Conservative Christian Social Party	687,324	4
Zürich	35	279,672	185,375	Evangelical People's Party	306,895	2
Zürich	35	279,672	185,375	National Action	192,541	1
Zürich	35	279,672	185,375	Social-Political Group	190,019	1
Zürich	35	279,672	185,375	Party of Labour	167,334	0
Zürich	35	279,672	185,375	List for Freedom of Expression in Parliament	155,308	0
Zürich	35	279,672	185,375	United Citizens' Party	19,116	0
Zürich	35	279,672	185,375	Swiss People's Party	9,253	0
Source: Bundesblatt, 17 November 1967

=== Council of the States ===
In several cantons the members of the Council of the States were chosen by the cantonal parliaments.

Party	Seats	+/–
Conservative Christian Social Party	18	0
Free Democratic Party	14	+1
Party of Farmers, Traders and Independents	3	–1
Liberal Democratic Union	3	0
Social-Political Group	3	0
Social Democratic Party	2	–1
Alliance of Independents	1	+1
Total	44	0
Source: Nohlen & Stöver
