= James Schwarzenbach =

Swiss politician (1911–1994)

National Councillor
- Incumbent
- Assumed office 4 December 1967 - 1 March 1979

Personal details
- Born: James Eduard Schwarzenbach; 5 August 1911 Rüschlikon, Zürich, Switzerland
- Died: 27 October 1994 (aged 83) St. Moritz, Grisons, Switzerland
- Party: Swiss Democrats
- Spouse: Alice Bühler (m. 1949)
- Relatives: Renée Schwarzenbach-Wille (aunt); Annemarie Schwarzenbach (cousin)
- Education: University of Zurich; University of Fribourg; University of Zurich

James Eduard Schwarzenbach (5 August 1911 – 27 October 1994) was a right-wing Swiss politician and publicist. In the 1970s he was head of the short-lived Republican Movement. He also was publisher of a broad spectrum of right-wing literature as owner of the Thomas-Verlag. He served in the National Council from 12 December 1967 to 28 February 1979, representing the Canton of Zürich.

== Biography ==
Schwarzenbach was born on 5 August 1911 in Rüschlikon, the third of five children, to Edwin (1878-1952) and Elsa Schwarzenbach (née von Muralt; 1888-1927). His father was an heir to the Schwarzenbach silk mills who went on in the publishing industry. Schwarzenbach was a first cousin of Annemarie Schwarzenbach. He was raised in the Protestant faith but he converted to Roman Catholicism during college in 1933. He was educated at Lyceum Alpinum Zuoz, a private boarding school, in Zuoz, Grisons. From 1930 he was studying history at the University of Zurich and the University of Fribourg.

In 1934, as a student, Schwarzenbach orchestrated a public uproar by his fellow members of the pro-Nazi movement National Front when the anti-fascist cabaret group "Die Pfeffermühle", in exile from Germany, was touring in Switzerland. In Zürich the cabaret, led by Therese Giehse, Erika Mann, and Klaus Mann, was only able to perform under police protection. James Schwarzenbach's aunt Renée Schwarzenbach-Wille was suspected to be the power behind the turmoil. She accused Erika Mann to have set up her daughter, the writer Annemarie Schwarzenbach who was a close friend of the Mann family, against her own family.

In 1939, at the age of 28, Schwarzenbach earned his doctorate in history at the University of Zurich. The subject of his thesis was the neutrality policy of Switzerland.

Schwarzenbach was a member of the Swiss National Council representing the National Action in the legislature between 1967 and 1971. Schwarzenbach's Republican Movement originated as a split of National Action in 1971, and it lasted until its dissolution in 1989.

Schwarzenbach is chiefly known for his initiative on Überfremdung ("excess of foreigners") that was put to the vote in June 1970. The referendum had a record turnout (75%), with 45% of the votes supporting Schwarzenbach's proposal. The proposal, if accepted, would have meant that the Swiss government had to limit foreign workers to Switzerland to 10%, which then would mean the deportation of up to 300,000 foreigners over 4 years. Although not enacted, the referendum did cause the number of available work-permits to be lowered. Xenophobia in Switzerland at the time was chiefly directed against Italian migrant workers, whose number had increased from 300,000 to over 1 million during the economic surge after World War II between 1950 and 1970.

Xenophobia decreased in the later 1970s as with slackening economy nearly as many migrant workers as had been targeted by the Schwarzenbach initiative lost their jobs and left Switzerland, raising its head again in the mid-1990s, this time targeting Ausländerkriminalität ("foreigner delinquency"). In this period, the xenophobic sentiment was addressed by populist propaganda of the Swiss People's Party (SVP), with Schwarzenbach's erstwhile secretary Ulrich Schlüer pursuing his former employer's politics within the ranks of the SVP.

In his later years, Schwarzenbach also voiced opposition against the EFTA, or the EU common market, as well as international institutions like the UN.

James Schwarzenbach who was also a writer of regional novels died at 83 in St. Moritz.

== Valuation ==
Buomberger (2004) claimed Schwarzenbach's ideology to be racist, nationalist, xenophobic, and given to antisemitic and anti-communist conspiracy theories, and he emphasized Schwarzenbach's role as pioneer in European right-wing populism which, outside of Switzerland, grew to notability only in the 1980s with parties such as the French Front National.

== Publications ==
- Schwarzenbach, James (1938). Der Dichter zwiespaltigen Lebens, François Mauriac. Benziger & Company, AG. p. 330.
- de Courten, Comte, Eugène; de Courten, Louis (1944). James Schwarzenbach (ed.). Im Kampf gegen den Bedrücker : Briefe der Brüder Eugène und Louis de Courten, Obersleutnant und Hauptmann im "Schweizer Banner" aus den Jahren 1798/99 [mit Frau Eugène de Courten], herausgegeben von James Schwarzenbach [In the struggle against the oppressor: letters from the Eugène brothers and Louis de Courten, chief lieutenant and captain in the "Swiss banner" from the years 1798/99 [with Mrs. Eugène de Courten], edited by James Schwarzenbach] (in German). Einsiedeln : Köln, Benziger (Druck von Benziger). OCLC 458953375.
- Schwarzenbach, James (1964). Dolch oder Degen: Ein Kaleidoskop unserer Zeit. Verlag "Der Republikaner". p. 380.
- Schwarzenbach, James (1965). Der Regimentsarzt: Roman aus dem Engadin. Thomas. p. 362.
- Schwarzenbach, James; Berry, Peter Robert (1967). Belle Epoque: Roman der Jahrhundertwende, nach Aufzeichnungen und Manuskripten von Peter Robert Berry, Arzt und Maler. Thomas-Verlag. p. 323.

== Literature ==
- Drews, Isabel, Schweizer erwache!" : der Rechtspopulist James Schwarzenbach (1967 - 1978), Studien zur Zeitgeschichte 7 (2005), ISBN 3-7193-1380-8 .
- Buomberger, Thomas, Kampf gegen unerwünschte Fremde : von James Schwarzenbach bis Christoph Blocher, Orell Füssli (2004), ISBN 3-280-06017-6.
- Maiolino, Angelo, Als die Italiener waren noch Tschinggen: Der Widerstand gegen die-Schwarzenbach Initiative, Zurich, Rotpunkt (2011), ISBN 978-3-85869-463-8.
- Scomazzon, Francesco, A Swiss populism? Italian workers in Switzerland between acceptance and xenophobia (1964-1984), in C. Chini, S. Moroni, "Populism. A historiographic category?, Cambridge, Cambridge Scholar Publishing (2018), pp. 109–19 ISBN 978-1-5275-1186-6.
