= Pro Libertate =

Right-wing political Association in Switzerland

Pro Libertate is an anti-communist, right-wing political association in Switzerland.

Pro Libertate was founded in 1956 in response to the crushing of the Hungarian Uprising of 1956. The association wrote letters to newspaper and made a series of publications, and organized traveling exhibitions to draw attention to the alleged danger of communism. The longtime president of the association was Max Mössinger; currently, Thomas Fuchs is the president.

Due to the détente between the Soviet Union and the West, followed by the collapse of European communist states and end of the Cold War, Pro Libertate lost some of its purpose. It shifted toward advocating for a strong Swiss Army, and opposing efforts to abolish the Army or end conscription. In 1989 it fought the first ballot initiative to abolish the Army, by the Group for a Switzerland Without an Army, and it has organised opposition to every such initiative since. In connection with the critical reappraisal of the role of Switzerland during the Second World War in the 1990s, Pro Libertate supported the traditional, positive view of Switzerland's active duty servicemembers and of the government's choices, in a submission to the Bergier commission.
