= Swiss Party of Labour =

Swiss political party

Swiss Party of Labour: Partei der Arbeit der Schweiz (German); Parti Suisse du Travail–Parti Ouvrier et Populaire (French); Partito Svizzero del Lavoro–Partito Operaio e Popolare (Italian); Partida Svizra da la Lavur (Romansh)
- President: Norberto Crivelli
- Founded: 14 October 1944
- Preceded by: Communist Party of Switzerland; Swiss Socialist Federation
- Headquarters: Turmweg 24 3013, Bern
- Youth wing: Communist Youth Switzerland
- Membership: 1,000+
- Ideology: Communism; Socialism
- Political position: Left-wing to far-left
- European affiliation: Party of the European Left (associated member)
- Colours: Red
- National Council: 0 / 200
- Council of States: 0 / 46
- Cantonal legislatures: 13 / 2,559

Website
- www.pst.ch (French); pda.ch (German); popti.ch (Italian)

The Swiss Party of Labour (German: Partei der Arbeit der Schweiz; French: Parti Suisse du Travail – Parti Ouvrier et Populaire; Italian: Partito Svizzero del Lavoro – Partito Operaio e Popolare; Romansh: Partida svizra da la lavur) is a communist party in Switzerland.

== History ==
The party was founded in 1944 by the illegal Communist Party of Switzerland. On 21 May, the constituent conference of the Basel Federation of the party was held. On 14–15 October the same year, the first Party Congress of the party was held in Zürich, with Léon Nicole elected to the role of President and Karl Hofmaier to General Secretary. On 6–7 October 1945, the Second Congress was held in Geneva. By this time the party had 20 000 members. On 30 November to 1 December, the 3rd Congress was held in Zürich. On 27 July a Swiss Party Conference was held in Bern, in which Karl Hofmaier was removed from his position as a result of a financial scandal. In the national elections of 1947 the party received 5.1% of the vote.

Poster for the 2006 elections to the Grand Council of Bern.

On 4–6 July 1949, the 4th Congress was held, during which steps to strengthen the organization as a Cadre Party were taken. As a result of this Congress, Edgar Woog was elected General Secretary. In 1950, the party worked intensively for the Stockholm Appeal, collecting 260 000 signatures from the Swiss population. From 31 May to 2 June 1952, the 5th Congress was held in Geneva. On 7 December, the Central Committee expelled Léon Nicole from the party. On 28–30 May, the 6th Congress was held in Geneva.

The 7th Congress was held in Geneva from 16–18 May 1959. A new party programme approved with the concept of antimonopolistic unity, termed the "Swiss Road to Socialism" (inspired by the similar programme of the Communist Party of Great Britain). The 8th Congress was held in Geneva from 16 to 18 May 1964. As of 2015, the party had no seats in the Swiss cantonal councils and was not represented in any of the 26 cantonal governments.

Logo of the party in Italian.

The XXII Congress of the section of the Ticino, held on 10 November 2013, marked the unification of the organs partisan Ticino with those of the Italian Grisons, creating the Communist Party of Southern Switzerland, which has stopped the collaboration with the Swiss Party of Labour after 2014; it became the Communist Party, which is not active on a national level.

=== 2007 national elections ===
Holding two seats in the Swiss National Council (the lower chamber of the Swiss parliament) going into the 2007 elections, the party stood candidates in the cantons of Zürich, Vaud, Geneva and Ticino on their own; in Neuchâtel the candidate appeared on a joint list with Solidarity. While the share of the vote in 2007 was similar to the party's 2003 results (0.7%), the party lost the seat held by Josef Zisyadis while retaining the seat held by Marianne Huguenin. However, on 1 November 2007 Huguenin announced her resignation from the National Council to focus on her position as mayor of Renens, Vaud, leaving Zisyadis to take the Party's seat in the National Council representing Vaud.

== Election results ==
=== National Council ===
Election	Votes	%	Seats	+/–
1947	49,353	5.0	7 / 194	New
1951	25,659	2.7	5 / 196	▼2
1955	25,060	2.6	4 / 196	▼1
1959	26,346	2.7	1 / 196	▼3
1963	21,088	2.2	4 / 200	▲3
1967	28,723	2.9	5 / 200	▲1
1971	51,341	2.6	5 / 200	0
1975	45,799	2.4	4 / 200	▼1
1979	38,187	2.1	3 / 200	▼1
1983	17,488	0.9	1 / 200	▼2
1987	15,528	0.8	1 / 200	0
1991	15,871	0.8	2 / 200	▲1
1995	22,850	1.18	3 / 200	▲1
1999	18,569	1.0	2 / 200	▼1
2003	14,595	0.68	2 / 200	0
2007	17,218	0.74	1 / 200	▼1
2011	21,482	0.54	0 / 200	▼1
2015	21,574	0.4	1 / 200	▲1
2019	25,427	0.6	1 / 200	0
2023	18,435	0.7	0 / 200	▼1

=== Cantonal-level ===
PdA vote percentage, federal elections 1971–2019
Canton	1971	1975	1979	1983	1987	1991	1995	1999	2003	2007	2011	2015	2019
Switzerland	2.6	2.4	2.1	0.9	0.8	0.8	1.2	1.0	0.7	0.7	0.5	0.4	0.6
Zürich	1.6	1.1	1.2	0.3	0.3	*^{a}	*	*	*	0.2	0.2	0.2	0.3
Bern	*	0.6	0.3	*	*	0.2	*	*	*	*	0.3	0.5	0.6
Fribourg	*	*	*	*	*	*	0.9	*	*	*	*	*	*
Solothurn	*	*	1.0	*	0.3	*	*	*	*	*	*	*	*
Basel-Stadt	6.1	4.6	4.7	2.3	1.9	1.4	1.3	*	*	*	*	*	*
Basel-Landschaft	*	1.8	1.0	*	*	*	*	*	*	*	*	*	*
St. Gallen	*	0.4	*	*	*	*	*	*	*	*	*	*	*
Ticino	2.8	3.6	2.7	*	1.2	0.7	1.3	1.3	*	1.3	1.2	0.5	0.8
Vaud	12.2	10.7	9.3	4.1	3.5	4.2	8.9	7.8	6.7	4.7	2.1	2.9^{b}	1.9
Valais	*	*	*	*	*	*	0.9	*	*	*	*	*	*
Neuchâtel	13.7	9.8	7.7	4.2	3.8	5.2	7.1	6.9	3.0	9.2	10.4	12.2	12.1
Genève	20.8	18.0	19.9	9.5	8.7	7.8	9.4	8.7	2.7	1.9	1.3	6.1^{b}	1.2
Jura	^{c}	^{c}	*	*	*	*	*	*	*	*	*	3.8	*

1.^a* indicates that the party was not on the ballot in this canton.
2.^bCombined result for PdA and Solidarity.
3.^cPart of the Canton of Bern until 1979.
