= Evangelical People's Party of Switzerland =

Swiss political party

Evangelical People's Party of Switzerland: Evangelische Volkspartei der Schweiz (German); Parti évangelique suisse (French); Partito Evangelico Svizzero (Italian); Partida evangelica da la Svizra (Romansh)
- Abbreviation: EVP; PEV
- President: Lilian Studer
- Founded: 1919; 107 years ago (Note: P. Christian Protestant); 1994; 32 years ago (Note: Swiss Evangelical P.)
- Headquarters: Josefstrasse 32, Case Postale 3467; 8021 Zürich, Zürich Canton
- Membership (2023): ▼4,400 (Note: Decrease in membership from 4,600 (2015) to 4,400 (2023).)
- Ideology: Christian democracy; Social conservatism; Stewardship theology
- Political position: Economic: Centre to centre-left; Social: Centre-right
- Religion: Christianity (Protestant)
- European affiliation: European Christian Political Party
- Colours: Yellow; Blue
- National Council: 2 / 200
- Council of States: 0 / 46
- Cantonal Executives: 1 / 154
- Cantonal Legislatures: 42 / 2,544

Website
- www.evppev.ch

The Evangelical People's Party of Switzerland (German: Evangelische Volkspartei der Schweiz, EVP), Swiss Evangelical Party (French: Parti évangelique suisse, PEV; Italian: Partito Evangelico Svizzero, PEV), or Evangelical Party of Switzerland (Romansh: Partida evangelica da la Svizra, PEV) is a Protestant Christian-democratic political party in Switzerland, active mainly in the Cantons of Bern, Basel-Land, Basel-Stadt, Aargau and Zürich. "Evangelical" translates as evangelisch, the German term for "Protestant", as opposed to "evangelical" as used in Anglo-Saxon Christianity.

Logo of the party before the 100th anniversary redesign (in German)

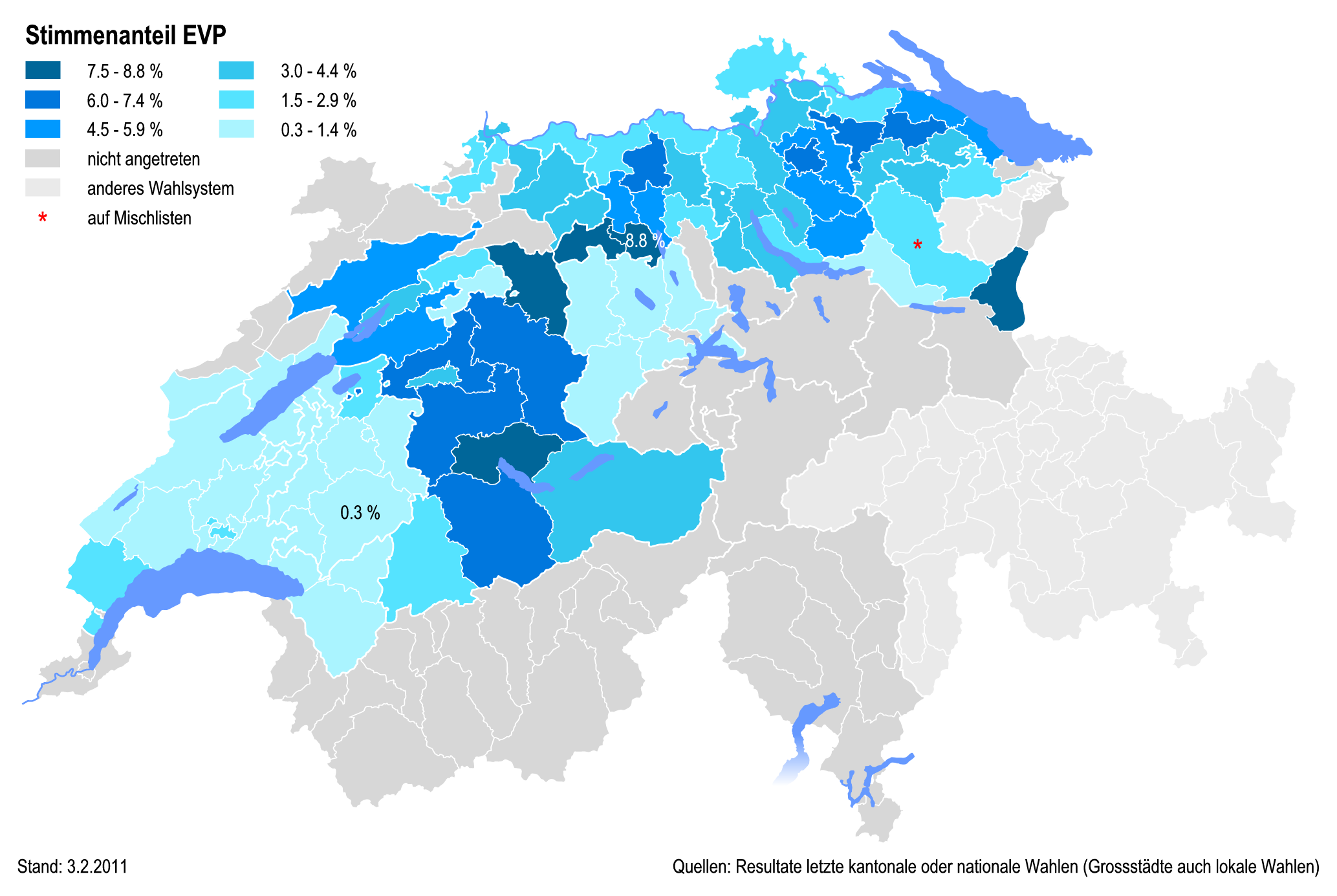
EVP at district level, 2011

The EVP is conservative on euthanasia, abortion, registered partnerships and other typically Christian issues, centrist on economic issues and stands rather centre-left on issues of wealth redistribution, education, environmentalism and immigration. Among other things, it claims to be "dedicated to protecting the environment out of a sense of responsibility for Creation" and states that "the ethical values of the Bible should be the foundation of society."

The EVP is a member of the European Christian Political Party (EPCP) and was previously an observer member of the European People's Party (EPP) until 2008. In the Federal Assembly of Switzerland the EVP forms a joint group with The Centre, formerly known as Christian Democratic People's Party (CVP).

In February 2023, in a shock result, Thomi Jourdan of Basel-Landschaft's EVP – which has a voter base of less than 4% in that canton – was elected into the state government, and will join four centrist-leftist-green colleagues. He is the first EVP government member on the state or federal level in Swiss history. This was due to a very active campaign from his side, and a lackluster one of his SVP opponent, national councillor Sandra Sollberger, who only appealed to right-wing voters. She also cited a lack of time which prevented her from campaigning properly.

== Election results ==
=== National Council ===
Election	Votes	%	Seats	+/–
1919	6,031	0.81 (#8)	1 / 200	New
1922	6,036	0.86 (#9)	1 / 200	0
1925	6,888	0.93 (#8)	1 / 200	0
1928	5,618	0.70 (#8)	1 / 200	0
1931	8,454	0.98 (#8)	1 / 200	0
1935	6,780	0.74 (#12)	1 / 200	0
1939	5,726	0.93 (#11)	0 / 200	▼1
1943	3,627	0.41 (#10)	1 / 200	▲1
1947	9,072	0.94 (#9)	1 / 200	0
1951	9,559	0.99 (#9)	1 / 200	0
1955	10,581	1.08 (#9)	1 / 200	0
1959	14,038	1.43 (#9)	2 / 200	▲1
1963	15,690	1.63 (#9)	2 / 200	0
1967	15,728	1.58 (#8)	3 / 200	▲1
1971	42,778	2.15 (#10)	3 / 200	0
1975	37,959	1.97 (#10)	3 / 200	0
1979	40,744	2.22 (#7)	3 / 200	0
1983	40,837	2.08 (#9)	3 / 200	0
1987	37,265	1.93 (#11)	3 / 200	0
1991	38,681	1.89 (#10)	3 / 200	0
1995	34,071	1.79 (#10)	2 / 200	▼1
1999	35,679	1.83 (#8)	3 / 200	▲1
2003	47,838	2.28 (#6)	3 / 200	0
2007	56,361	2.42 (#6)	2 / 200	▼1
2011	48,789	2.00 (#8)	2 / 200	0
2015	47,355	1.90 (#8)	2 / 200	0
2019	50,317	2.08 (#8)	3 / 200	▲1
2023	49,828	1.95 (#7)	2 / 200	▼1
