= Yann Richter =

Swiss politician (1928–2008)

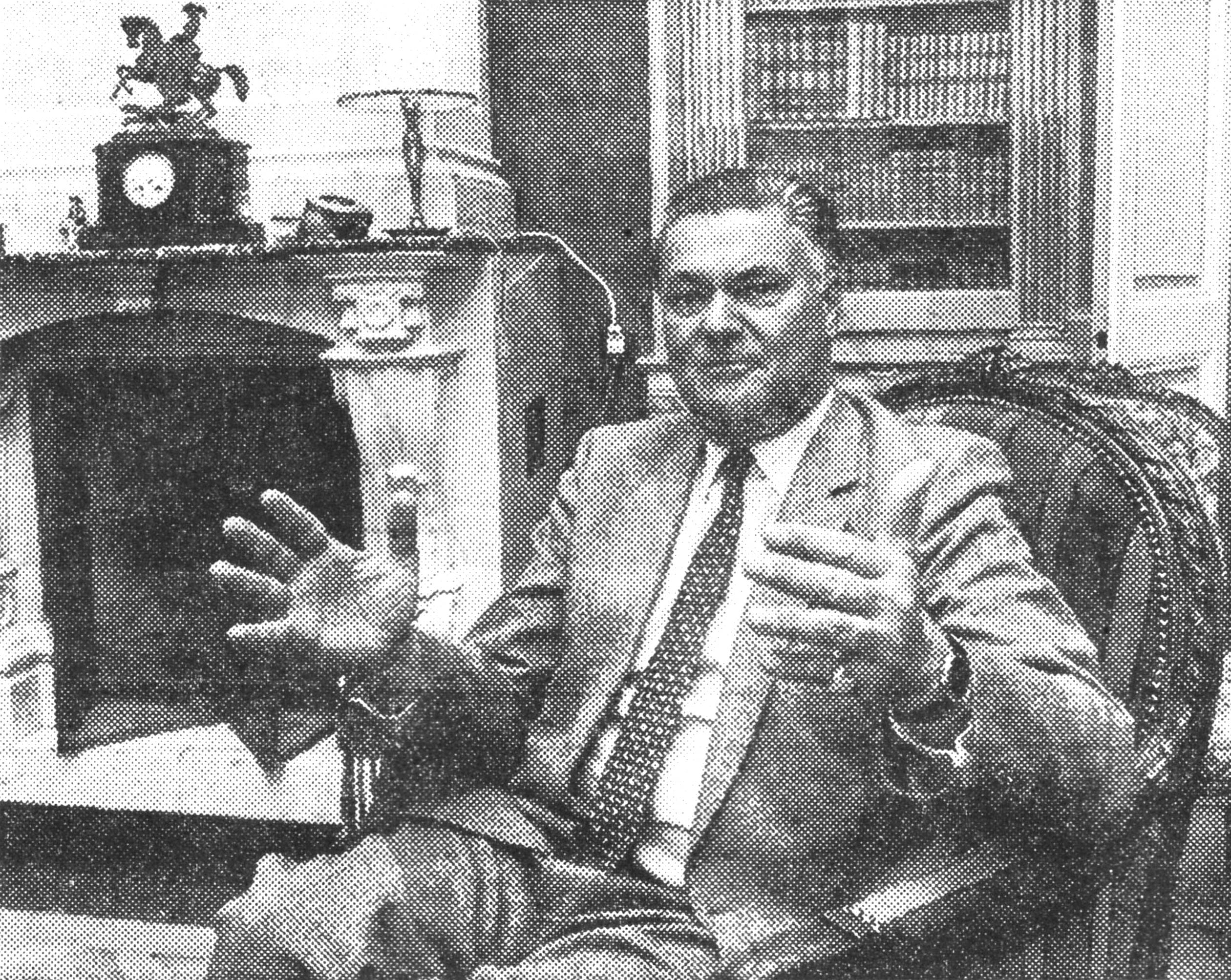
Yann Richter in 1983.

Yann Richter-Du Pasquier (4 April 1928 Hauterive, Neuchâtel - 20 July 2008 Neuchâtel, Switzerland) was a Swiss politician. He served as the first President of the Free Democratic Party of Switzerland (FDP) from 1978 until 1984.

Richter died of heart disease on 20 July 2008, in Neuchâtel, Switzerland, at the age of 80.
