= Swiss Democrats =

- German name: Schweizer Demokraten
- French name: Démocrates Suisses
- Italian name: Democratici Svizzeri
- Romansh name: Democrats Svizers
- President: Andreas Stahel
- Members of the Federal Council: None
- Founded: 1961
- Ideology: Swiss nationalism Euroscepticism
- Political position: Right-wing to far-right
- Colours: Red

Website
- www.schweizer-demokraten.ch

The Swiss Democrats (German: Schweizer Demokraten; French: Démocrates Suisses; Italian: Democratici Svizzeri; Romansh: Democrats Svizers) is a nationalist political party in Switzerland. It was called the National Action against the Alienation of the People and the Home (German: Nationale Aktion gegen Überfremdung von Volk und Heimat; NA) until 1977 and the National Action for People and Home (German: Nationale Aktion für Volk und Heimat) until 1990, when it was renamed to its current name.

== History ==
The Nationale Aktion was originally a far-right xenophobic movement pursuing an anti-immigration agenda, founded in 1961. The party "emerged as a reaction to the influx of foreign workers", particularly Italians, during this time. The party submitted several popular initiatives that supported reduced immigration, most notably one in June 1970 that narrowly failed. Its first representative in the National Council was James Schwarzenbach, who was first elected in 1967.

After a hostile split with Schwarzenbach in 1971, who formed the Republican Movement, the party lost most of its momentum during the 1970s. It had a strong resurgence in the early 1980s, and it won five seats in the 1991 federal elections, the most it had ever held.

After another hostile split with former president Valentin Oehen in 1986, the party was renamed to its current name in 1990. After 1998, the party lost nearly all significance in national politics because of the absorption of right-wing votes into the growing Swiss People's Party.

In the 2003 federal elections, the party won 1.0% of the vote and one out of 200 seats in the National Council. This seat was lost in the 2007 elections, where the SD fell to 0.5% of the popular vote. After their severe election loss, the party congress decided not to disband but to continue competing in elections, striving to return to parliament.

== Federal elections ==
Federal Assembly of Switzerland
| Election | # of total votes | % of popular vote | # of seats won |
|---|---|---|---|
| 1967 | 6,275 | 0.6% | 1 |
| 1971 | 63,781 | 3.2% ▲ | 4 ▲ |
| 1975 | 47,796 | 2.5% ▼ | 2 ▼ |
| 1979 | 24,257 | 1.3% ▼ | 2 |
| 1983 | 57,592 | 2.9% ▲ | 4 ▲ |
| 1987 | 49,104 | 2.5% ▼ | 3 ▼ |
| 1991 | 69,297 ▲ | 3.4% ▲ | 5 ▲ |
| 1995 | 59,613 ▼ | 3.1% ▼ | 3 ▼ |
| 1999 | 35,883 ▼ | 1.8% ▼ | 1 ▼ |
| 2003 | 20,177 ▼ | 1.0% ▼ | 1 |
| 2007 | 12,609 ▼ | 0.5% ▼ | 0 ▼ |
| 2011 | | 0.2% ▼ | 0 |
| 2015 | 3,052 | 0.1% ▼ | 0 |
| 2019 | 3,202 | 0.1% ▲ | 0 |
| 2023 | 2,030 | 0.08% ▼ | 0 |

== Party presidents ==
- James Schwarzenbach (?–1971)
- Rudolf Weber (1971/72)
- Valentin Oehen (1972–1980)
- Hans Zwicky (1980–1986)
- Rudolf Keller (1986–2005)
- Bernhard Hess (2005–2012)
- Andreas Stahel (2012–)

== See also ==
- Freedom Party of Switzerland.

== Bibliography ==
- Skenderovic, Damir (2009). The radical right in Switzerland: continuity and change, 1945-2000. Berghahn Books. ISBN 978-1-84545-580-4.
