= Valentin Oehen =

Swiss politician (1931–2022)

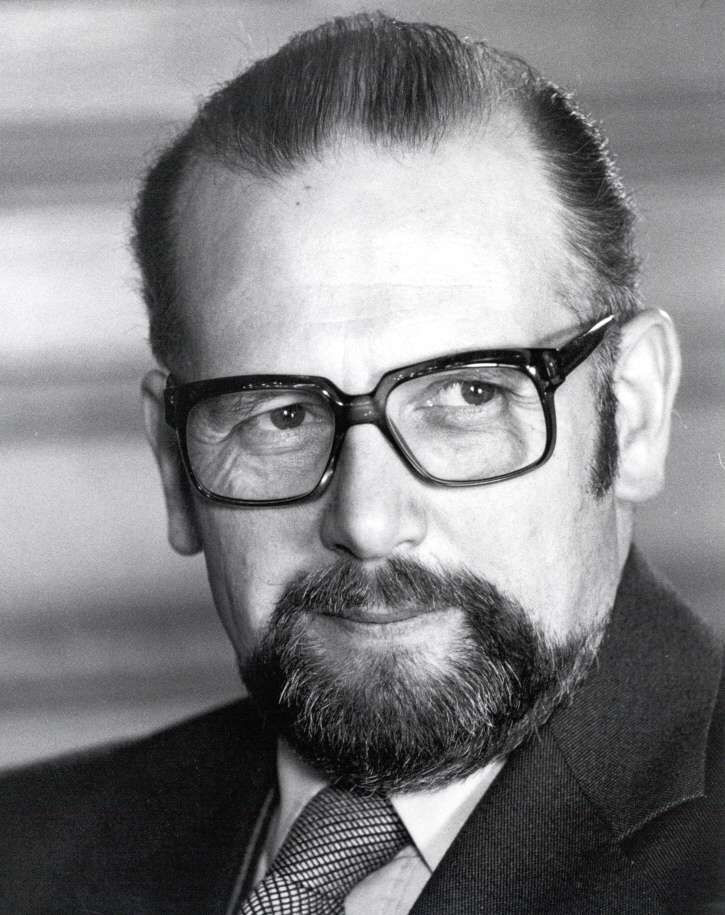
- Oehen in 1986

Member of the Swiss National Council
- In office 1971–1987

Member of the Grand Council of Ticino
- In office 1987–1991

Personal details
- Born: 26 June 1931 Neudorf, Lucerne, Switzerland
- Died: 2 June 2022 (aged 90) Nottwil, Switzerland
- Party: DS

Valentin Oehen (26 June 1931 – 2 June 2022) was a Swiss politician. He was a member of the National Action against the Alienation of the People and the Home (renamed later in Swiss Democrats, DS).

== Biography ==
Oehen became president of the National Action in 1968, where he stayed until his departure from the party in 1986 due to a dispute with Markus Ruf. Oehen served in the National Council from 1971 to 1987, where he represented the Canton of Bern. During this period, he participated in the Swiss initiatives against foreign overpopulation.

In 1979, Oehen submitted a parliamentary initiative that would have introduced the death penalty for murder and terrorism involving hostage-taking . The National Council rejected this by 131 votes to 3.

In 1984, he led the Popular initiative "against the selling off of national soil", which failed in a referendum with 51.5% voting against it.

In May 1988, Oehen announced his retirement from his political career, which concluded when his term in the Grand Council of Ticino expired in 1991.

Valentin Oehen died in Nottwil on 2 June 2022 at the age of 91.
