= Alliance of Independents =

Political party in Switzerland

Alliance of Independents Landesring der Unabhängige Alliance des Indépendants Anello degli Indipendenti
- Abbreviation: LdU; AdL
- Founder: Gottlieb Duttweiler
- Founded: 30 December 1936
- Dissolved: 4 December 1999
- Ideology: Social liberalism Green liberalism

The Alliance of Independents, Ring of Independents, or National Ring of Independents, (German: Landesring der Unabhängigen (LdU), French: Alliance des Indépendants (AdI), Italian: Anello degli Indipendenti) was a social liberal political party in Switzerland that existed between 1936 and 1999.

== History of the party ==
=== Formation ===
Gottlieb Duttweiler – the founder of Migros, a retail business and consumer cooperative – was dissatisfied with Swiss politics in the 1930s and, therefore, founded the Alliance of Independents with a group of like-minded people. According to its statute, it was not meant to be a political party but an association to help reconcile capitalists and workers. From the beginning, the LdU also served the interests of the Migros cooperative, successfully lobbying against legislation that impeded its business model by restricting networks of general stores or sales by trucks (one of Migros' marketing strategies).

The political scientist D.L. Seiler has called it "a commercial enterprise continued by other means". The party won seven seats in the National Council of Switzerland elections in 1935 (although the seats were won in only three cantons of 26: five in Zürich, one each in St. Gallen and Bern). Since the original plan to unite the best politicians of all parties in one group did not work, the Alliance of Independents was transformed into a political party on December 30, 1936.

=== Duttweiler Era ===
Duttweiler's authoritarian style of leadership, combined with his vague political positions, led to a breakaway of leading figures from the party in 1943. These ran as Unabhängig-freie Liste (Eng: Independent- Free List) and won one seat in the National Council of Switzerland elections the following autumn. However, this breakaway did not last long. During the era of Duttweiler, the party always won around 5% of the vote. However, the party was never successful in Switzerland or central Switzerland's French or Italian-speaking regions (except in Lucerne).

=== Social Liberal Phase after Duttweiler ===
After the death of longtime chairman Duttweiler in 1962, the party established itself as a social liberal alternative between the left and the right. It won 9.1% and 16 seats out of 200 in the 1967 elections to the National Council of Switzerland, thus becoming the strongest opposition party. The LdU was mainly voted for by urban middle-class voters (blue-collar workers and civil servants). Several new local affiliates in different cantons were founded at this time. In the late 1970s, a conflict over policy broke out in the party. A new ecologist wing of the party confronted the traditional opponents of the social market economy.

=== Green Liberal Phase ===
In the mid-1980s, the ecologist wing of the party became the most dominant. By 1982, members of the green and social liberal wings of the party had resigned. Since the most significant financial backer of the party, Migros had ideological problems with the ecological wing of the party, it massively reduced its donations to the party. Due to financial problems, the daily party newspaper Die Tat (The Deed) had to be converted into a weekly newspaper. The party lost its profile, and its voters switched to new parties and protest groups (Green Party, Car Party).

=== Decline and Disbandment ===
The party continued to lose more of its voters to the Social Democratic and Green parties. In the 1990s, the party tried unsuccessfully to win back these voters by returning to its social liberal roots. Following numerous election losses and prominent politicians' defections to other parties, the LdU disbanded on December 4, 1999.

== Chairmen ==
- 1936–1962 Gottlieb Duttweiler (Zürich)
- 1962–1973 Rudolf Suter (Basel)
- 1973–1978 Claudius Alder (Basel-Country)
- 1978–1985 Walter Biel (Zürich)
- 1985–1992 Franz Jaeger (St. Gallen)
- 1992–1996 Monika Weber (de) (Zürich)
- 1996–1998 Daniel Andres (Berne)
- 1999 Anton Schaller (Zürich)

== Notable politicians ==
- Alfred Rasser (Aargau)
- Sigmund Widmer (Zürich)
