= 2023 Swiss federal election =

- 22 October 2023
- National Council
- All 200 seats in the National Council; 101 seats needed for a majority
- Turnout: 46.6% (▲1.5pp)
Party	Leader	Vote %	Seats	+/–
Swiss People's	Marco Chiesa	27.93	62	+9
Social Democrats	C. Wermuth & M. Meyer	18.27	41	+2
FDP.The Liberals	Thierry Burkart	14.25	28	−1
The Centre	Gerhard Pfister	14.06	29	+1
Greens	Balthasar Glättli	9.78	23	−5
Green Liberals	Jürg Grossen	7.55	10	−6
Evangelical People's	Lilian Studer	1.95	2	−1
Federal Democrats	Daniel Frischknecht	1.23	2	+1
Ticino League	A. Bignasca & B. Bignasca	0.55	1	0
Geneva Citizens'	Ana Roch	0.51	2	+2
This lists parties that won seats. See the complete results below.
- Council of States
- All 46 seats in the Council of States; 24 seats needed for a majority
Party	Seats	+/–
The Centre	15	+2
FDP.The Liberals	11	−1
Social Democrats	9	0
Swiss People's	6	0
Greens	3	−2
Geneva Citizens'	1	+1
Green Liberals	1	+1
This lists parties that won seats. See the complete results below.
National Council

Federal elections were held in Switzerland on 22 October 2023 to elect all members of the National Council and Council of States. (Note: Date for the National Council election and first round of the Council of States election; dates for the runoffs to the Council of States vary between the cantons.) The elections were followed by elections to the Federal Council, Switzerland's government and collegial presidency, on 13 December.

The Swiss People's Party (SVP), which campaigned against migration, performed strongly, while the Green and Green Liberal parties saw their vote share decline.

== Timeline ==
The election timeline is:

- Mid-October 2022: Official information to the cantons and parties
- 31 December 2022: Deadline for party registration
- 1 March 2023: Publication of the candidacy deadlines for the National Council
- 30 April: Landsgemeinde in Appenzell-Innerrhoden (Council of States election in the canton)
- 1 May: Update of the party register
- August: Candidacy deadline for the National Council in the cantons using proportional representation
- September: Delivery of the electoral guide to the cantons
- 4 September: Candidacy deadline for the cantons using majoritarian vote with possibility of walkover
- Late September: Delivery of the voting material
- 22 October: Election day (National Council & 1st round for the Council of States)
- Late October: Publication of the official results
- 12 November: Eventual runoffs for the Council of States in six cantons representing 12 seats (FR, GE, GR, TG, VD, VS)
- 19 November: Eventual runoffs for the Council of States in ten cantons representing 19 seats (AG, BE, BL, GL, SG, SH, SO, TI, ZG, ZH)
- 26 November: Eventual runoffs for the Council of States in six cantons representing 9 seats (AR, BS, LU, NW, SZ, UR)
- 4 December: Opening of the new National Council and oath-taking
- 13 December: Election of the Federal Council

== Electoral system ==
=== National Council ===
The 200 members of the National Council are elected from the 26 cantons, each of which constitutes a constituency. In all multi-member cantons open-list proportional representation is used; with apparentments for allied parties and sub-apparentments for lists within parties, where apparented lists are initially counted together for seats allocation. Seats are allocated using the Hagenbach-Bischoff system with no threshold. Voters may cross out names on party lists or write names twice, split their vote between parties (a system known as panachage), or draw up their own list on a blank ballot. The six single-member cantons use first-past-the-post voting.

Seats in the National Council are apportioned to the cantons based on their respective population size (which includes children and resident foreigners who do not have the right to vote). Based on the official population count recorded at the end of 2020, Basel-Stadt lost a seat while Zürich gained one. Zürich is the canton with the most seats (36).

The rules regarding who can stand as a candidate and vote in elections to the National Council are uniform across the Confederation. Only Swiss citizens aged at least 18 can stand or vote and the citizens resident abroad can register to vote in the canton in which they last resided (or their canton of citizenship, otherwise) and be able to vote no matter how long since, or whether they ever have, lived in Switzerland.

Apportionment of National Council seats by canton in 2023
Canton	Population	Seats	+/−	Pop. by seat
Zürich	1,553,423	36	+1	43,151
Bern	1,043,132	24	±0	43,464
Lucerne	416,347	9	±0	46,261
Uri	36,819	1	±0	36,819
Schwyz	162,157	4	±0	40,539
Obwalden	38,108	1	±0	38,108
Nidwalden	43,520	1	±0	43,520
Glarus	40,851	1	±0	40,851
Zug	128,794	3	±0	42,931
Fribourg	325,496	7	±0	46,499
Solothurn	277,462	6	±0	46,244
Basel-Stadt	196,735	4	−1	49,184
Basel-Landschaft	290,969	7	±0	41,567
Schaffhausen	83,107	2	±0	41,554
Appenzell Ausserrhoden	55,309	1	±0	55,309
Appenzell Innerrhoden	16,293	1	±0	16,293
St. Gallen	514,504	12	±0	42,875
Grisons	200,096	5	±0	40,019
Aargau	694,072	16	±0	43,380
Thurgau	282,909	6	±0	47,152
Ticino	350,986	8	±0	43,873
Vaud	814,762	19	±0	42,882
Valais	348,503	8	±0	43,563
Neuchâtel	175,894	4	±0	43,974
Geneva	506,343	12	±0	42,195
Jura	73,709	2	±0	36,855
Total	8,670,300	200	±0	43,352

=== Council of States ===
The 46 members of the Council of States are elected in 20 two-seat constituencies (representing the 20 'full' cantons) and six single-member constituencies (representing the six half-cantons). Two 'full' cantons with small populations – Uri and Glarus – each have two seats in the Council of States but only one seat each in the much larger National Council.

Elections to the Council of States are regulated by the cantons. The cantons of Jura and Neuchâtel use proportional representation, while all the others use a majoritarian system, often with two rounds of voting. In the first round voters typically have up to two votes and candidates need an overall majority to be elected; if seats remain to be filled a runoff is held using simple plurality. All cantons, except Appenzell-Innerrhoden, which elects its state councilor during the Landsgemeinde in April, hold the first round concurrently with the National Council election, but the dates for the runoffs vary.

As each canton regulates its election to the Council of States, the rules regarding who can stand as a candidate and vote in these elections vary canton by canton. Jura and Neuchâtel allow certain foreign residents to vote, whilst Glarus allows 16- and 17-year-olds to vote. Swiss citizens abroad registered to vote in a canton are permitted to vote in that canton's Council of States election only if the canton's law allows it. Only Schaffhausen has compulsory voting, though limited in implementation by way of only an insignificant fine.

Apportionment of Council of States seats by canton
Seats	Cantons
Cantons with 2 seats	Zürich, Bern, Lucerne, Uri, Schwyz, Glaris, Zug, Fribourg, Solothurn, Schaffhausen, St. Gallen, Grisons, Aargau, Thurgau, Ticino, Vaud, Valais, Neuchâtel, Geneva, Jura
Cantons with 1 seat ('half-cantons')	Obwalden, Nidwalden, Basel-Stadt, Basel-Landschaft, Appenzell Innerrhoden, Appenzell Ausserrhoden

== Contesting parties ==
The table below lists contesting parties represented in the Federal Assembly before the election.

Name		Political group	Ideology	Leader(s)	2019 result		
Name		Political group	Ideology	Leader(s)	Votes (%)	National Council	Council of States
SVP / UDC	Swiss People's Party	Swiss People's Party group (V)	National conservatism Right-wing populism	Marco Chiesa	25.6%	53 / 200	6 / 46
SP / PS	Social Democratic Party	Social Democratic group (S)	Social democracy Democratic socialism	Mattea Meyer & Cédric Wermuth	16.8%	39 / 200	9 / 46
FDP / PLR	FDP.The Liberals	FDP-Liberal group (RL)	Liberalism; Conservative liberalism	Thierry Burkart	15.1%	29 / 200	12 / 46
DM / LC / AdC	The Centre	The Centre group (M-E)	Centrism; Social conservatism	Gerhard Pfister	13.8%	28 / 200	13 / 46
GRÜNE / VERT-E-S	Green Party	Greens group (G)	Green politics Progressivism	Balthasar Glättli	13.2%	28 / 200	5 / 46
glp / pvl	Green Liberal Party	Green Liberal group (GL)	Green liberalism	Jürg Grossen	7.8%	16 / 200	0 / 46
EVP / PEV	Evangelical People's Party	The Centre group (M-E)	Christian democracy Social conservatism	Lilian Studer	2.1%	3 / 200	0 / 46
PdA / PST	Swiss Party of Labour	Greens group (G)	Communism; Marxism	Gavriel Pinson	1,0%	1 / 200	0 / 46
solidaritéS	Solidarity	Greens group (G)	Anti-capitalism; Trotskyism	Collective leadership	1,0%	1 / 200	0 / 46
EDU/UDF	Federal Democratic Union	Swiss People's Party group (V)	Christian right Right-wing populism	Daniel Frischknecht	1.0%	1 / 200	0 / 46
LdT	Ticino League	Swiss People's Party group (V)	Regionalism; Right-wing populism	Antonella Bignasca & Boris Bignasca	0.8%	1 / 200	0 / 46

== Candidates ==
For this election, the Federal office of statistics reports a record in the number of candidacies. 5909 people (2408 women (41%) and 3501 men (59%)) in total, which is an increase of 1264 or 27% compared to last election, are candidates for the National Council on a total of 618 lists (an increase of 107).

Nearly a third (30%) of the candidates for the national council are younger than 30 years old. The average age is under 40 for the Greens and PS/SP, and it exceeds 50 for the smaller right-wing parties Ticino League and Geneva Citizens Movement.

=== Incumbents not standing for re-election ===
==== National Council ====
As of 8 April 2023, 25 National Council incumbents (an eighth of the council) announced they would not stand in this election.

Member	Canton	First elected	Party
Pirmin Schwander	Schwyz	2003	SVP/UDC
Walter Wobmann	Solothurn	2003	SVP/UDC
Kurt Fluri	Solothurn	2003	FDP/PLR
Christa Markwalder	Bern	2003	FDP/PLR
Edith Graf-Litscher	Thurgau	2005	SP/PS
Ida Glanzmann	Lucerne	2006	DM/LC
Ada Marra	Vaud	2007	SP/PS
Jacques Bourgeois	Fribourg	2007	FDP/PLR
Doris Fiala	Zürich	2007	FDP/PLR
Christian Lüscher	Geneva	2007	FDP/PLR
Andreas Aebi	Bern	2007	SVP/UDC
Yvette Estermann	Lucerne	2007	SVP/UDC
Andrea Geissbühler	Bern	2007	SVP/UDC
Jean-Pierre Grin-Hofmann	Vaud	2007	SVP/UDC
Erich von Siebenthal	Bern	2007	SVP/UDC
Martin Landolt	Glarus	2009	DM/LC
Prisca Birrer-Heimo	Lucerne	2010	SP/PS
Yvonne Feri	Aargau	2011	SP/PS
Peter Keller	Nidwalden	2011	SVP/UDC
Alois Gmür	Schwyz	2011	DM/LC
Jean-Paul Gschwind	Jura	2011	DM/LC
Verena Herzog	Thurgau	2013	SVP/UDC
Roger Köppel	Zürich	2015	SVP/UDC
Angelo Barrile	Zürich	2015	SP/PS
Sandra Locher Benguerel	Grisons	2019	SP/PS

==== Council of States ====
As of 8 April 2023, 9 Council of States incumbents (nearly a fifth of the council) announced they would not stand in this election.

Member	Canton	First elected	Party
Alex Kuprecht	Schwyz	2003	SVP/UDC
Roberto Zanetti	Solothurn	2010	SP/PS
Hans Stöckli	Bern	2011	SP/PS
Thomas Hefti	Glarus	2014	FDP/PLR
Olivier Français	Vaud	2015	FDP/PLR
Ruedi Noser	Zürich	2015	FDP/PLR
Hansjörg Knecht	Aargau	2019	SVP/UDC
Marina Carobbio Guscetti	Ticino	2019	SP/PS
Adèle Thorens Goumaz	Vaud	2019	Greens

== Opinion polls ==
=== Graphical summary ===
The chart below depicts opinion polls conducted for the 2023 Swiss federal election; trendlines are local regressions (LOESS).

Local regression of polls conducted.

=== Nationwide polling since 2021 ===
Polling firm	Fieldwork date	Sample size	SVP/ UDC	SP/ PS	FDP/ PLR	DM/ LC	Grüne/ Verts	GLP/ PVL	EVP/ PEV	EDU/ UDF	Others	Lead
2023 election	22 Oct 2023	–	27.9	18.3	14.3	14.1	9.8	7.6	2.0	1.2	4.9	9.6
Sotomo	22 Sep – 5 Oct 2023	31,850	28.1	18.3	14.1	14.3	9.7	6.8	2.1	–	6.6	9.8
OpinionPlus	20–26 Sep 2023	1,623	28.8	17.8	14.0	14.1	10.4	7.2	2.2	1.1	4.6	11.0
LeeWas	19–20 Sep 2023	29,081	28.7	17.6	13.8	13.6	10.5	7.5	–	–	8.3	11.1
Sotomo	4–25 Aug 2023	40,889	27.6	17.3	14.6	14.8	10.7	7.3	2.1	–	5.6	10.3
LeeWas	10–11 Jul 2023	25,688	27.9	17.3	14.3	13.9	10.7	8.2	–	–	7.7	10.6
Sotomo	8–22 Jun 2023	25,216	27.1	17.8	14.6	14.3	10.2	8.3	2.1	–	5.5	9.3
Sotomo	20 Feb – 5 Mar 2023	27,058	26.6	17.8	15.6	13.3	10.7	8.3	2.1	–	5.6	8.8
LeeWas	15–17 Feb 2023	27,668	27.5	16.9	15.4	13.5	11.1	8.5	–	–	7.1	10.6
Sotomo	26 Sep – 7 Oct 2022	21,038	26.1	16.3	16.1	13.3	11.7	9.3	2.1	–	5.1	9.8
LeeWas	15–16 Aug 2022	26,298	25.9	16.2	16.4	13.4	11.8	9.2	–	–	7.1	9.5
LeeWas	8–9 Dec 2021	19,324	27.0	16.2	15.4	13.3	11.7	10.2	–	–	6.2	10.8
Sotomo	29 Sep – 3 Oct 2021	27,976	26.6	15.8	14.6	13.3	13.2	9.8	2.1	–	5.6	10.8
	1 Jan 2021	CVP/PDC and BDP/PBD merge into DM/LC										

=== National Council ===
Firm	Publication	SVP/ UDC	SP/ PS	FDP/ PLR	Grüne/ Verts	DM/ LC	GLP/ PVL	EVP/ PEV	PST-Sol	EDU/ UDF	Lega	MCG	Others	Lead
2023 election	22 Oct 2023	62	41	28	23	29	10	2	0	2	1	2	0	21
NZZ	7 Oct 2023	56	42	31	23	30	11	2	1	2	1	1	–	14
Tamedia	23 Sep 2023	57	40	30	24	29	13	7						17
CH Media	2 Sep 2023	55	39	31	24	32	12	2	1	2	2	–	–	16
2019 election	20 Oct 2019	53	39	29	28	28	16	3	2	1	1	0	0	14

=== Council of States ===
Firm	Publication	DM/ LC	FDP/ PLR	SP/ PS	SVP/ UDC	Grüne/ Verts	GLP/ PVL	MCG	Ind.	Lead
2023 election	22 Oct – 19 Nov 2023	15	11	9	6	3	1	1	0	4
Tamedia	30 Sep 2023	14	15	6	6	4	–	–	1	1
SRG	20 Sep 2023	13–14	14–15	5–6	6–8	4–5	–	–	1	0–2
2019 election	20 Oct – 24 Nov 2019	13	12	9	6	5	–	–	1	1

== Results ==
Results of the 2023 federal election

Results of the election by municipality

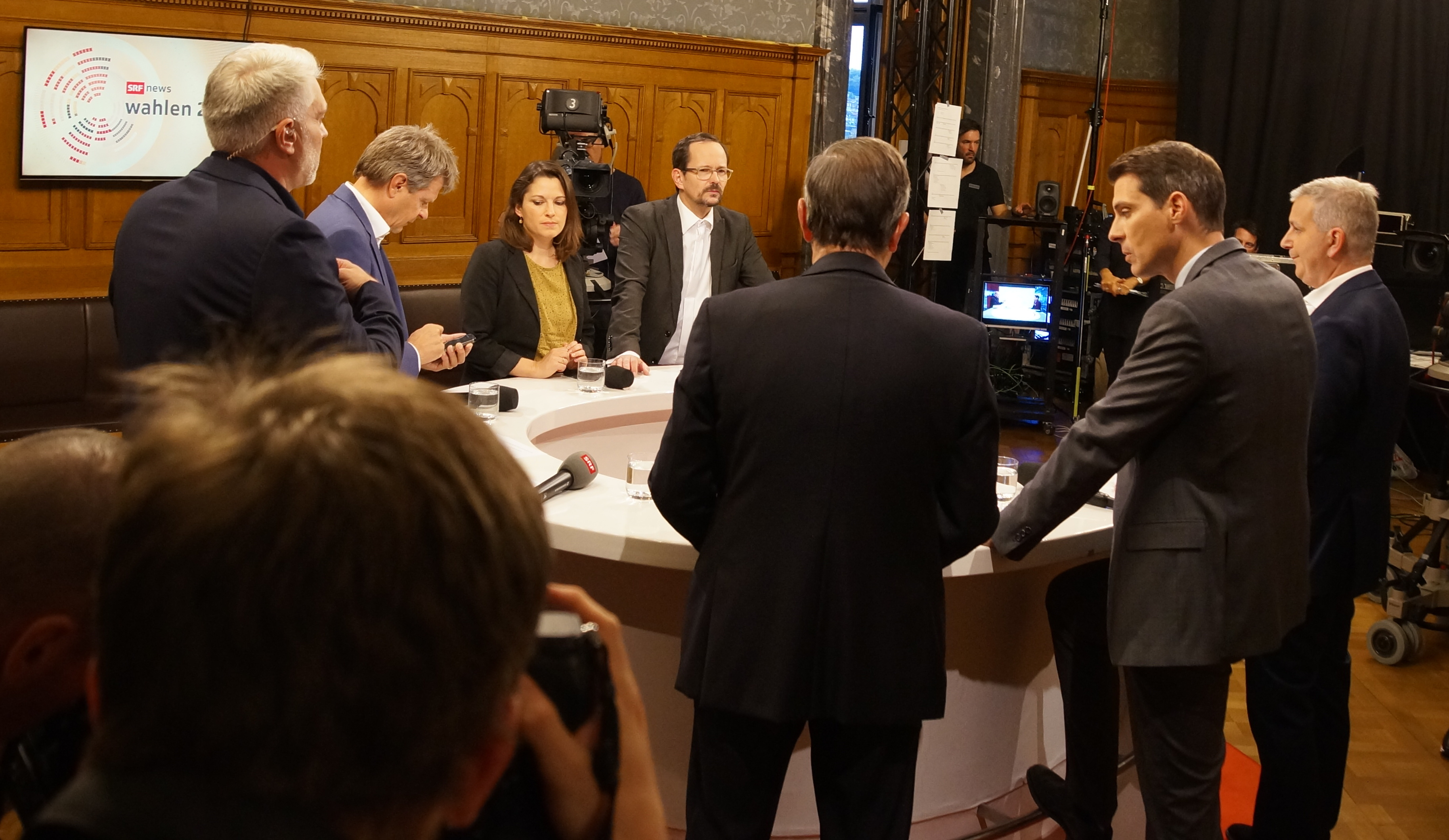
The party presidents on TV on election night

The SVP, which had campaigned heavily on opposing migration, performed strongly. The SVP made gains in Romandy, gaining for the first time more national councillors than the FDP in the region. The Centre notably gained seats, surpassing the FDP — putting the latter's second Federal Council seat in doubt — while the Green Party and Green Liberal Party performed poorly. The results indicated a stark divide between urban and rural areas. Although right-wing parties gained seats in the National Council, they did not secure a majority in the chamber. Despite the SVP's gains in the National Council, it did not perform as strongly in the Council of States, whereas The Centre gained seats. Neither the Left nor Right had a clear majority in the chamber.

=== National Council ===
Party	Votes	%	Seats	+/–
Swiss People's Party	713,471	27.93	62	+9
Social Democratic Party	466,714	18.27	41	+2
The Liberals	364,053	14.25	28	−1
The Centre	359,075	14.06	29	+1
Green Party	249,891	9.78	23	−5
Green Liberal Party	192,944	7.55	10	−6
Evangelical People's Party	49,828	1.95	2	−1
Federal Democratic Union	31,513	1.23	2	+1
Swiss Party of Labour	18,435	0.72	0	−2
Ticino League	14,160	0.55	1	0
Geneva Citizens' Movement	13,019	0.51	2	+2
Left-Alternative Greens	4,343	0.17	0	0
Christian Social Party	2,397	0.09	0	0
Swiss Democrats	2,030	0.08	0	0
Other parties	72,609	2.84	0	0
Total	2,554,482	100.00	200	–
Registered voters/turnout		46.6	+1.5	
Source: FSO

==== By canton ====
Canton	SVP		SP		Centre		FDP		Greens		GLP		Others	
Canton	%	Seats	%	Seats	%	Seats	%	Seats	%	Seats	%	Seats	%	Seats
Aargau	35.5	7	16.4	3	12.0	2	13.1	2	7.1	1	8.5	1	7.5 (Note: EVP: 3.5%, EDU: 1.0%, PdA: 0.1%, Others: 2.9%)	0
Appenzell Ausserrhoden	47.7	1	–	–	15.9	0	35.7	0	–	–	–	–	0.7	0
Appenzell Innerrhoden	2.4	0	–	–	86.7	1	–	–	–	–	–	–	10.9	0
Basel-Landschaft	28.9	2	24.7	2	10.6	1	14.2	1	10.0	1	7.0	0	4.6 (Note: EVP: 2.6%, EDU: 0.5%, Others: 1.5%)	0
Basel-Stadt	13.6	0	31.8	1	5.8	0	17.2 (Note: LPS: 10.3%)	1 (Note: LPS: 1)	17.1	1	9.1	1	5.2 (Note: EVP: 2.2%, EDU: 0.4%, Others: 2.6%)	0
Bern	30.9	8	20.7	5	8.1	2	7.5	1	10.8	3	10.5	3	11.3 (Note: EVP: 4.3%, EDU: 3.9%, Others: 3.1%)	2 (Note: EVP: 1, EDU: 1)
Fribourg	25.8	2	20.6	1	19.9	2	13.3	1	11.8	1	3.7	0	4.9 (Note: CSP: 2.5%, EDU: 1.1%, EVP: 0.7%, Others: 0.6%)	0
Geneva	15.3	2	18.4	3	8.2	1	15.7	2	15.4	2	6.7	0	20.4 (Note: MCR: 12.3%, PdA: 2.5%, EVP: 0.4%, Others: 5.2%)	2 (Note: MCR: 2)
Glarus	42.6	1	23.4	0	31.2	0	–	–	–	–	–	–	2.8	0
Grisons	30.6	2	17.8	1	23.9	1	13.7	1	5.2	0	6.3	0	2.5 (Note: EDU: 1.2%, EVP: 1.0%, Others: 0.3%)	0
Jura	19.1	1	29.6	1	26.5	0	8.7	0	11.1	0	2.4	0	2.7 (Note: EVP: 0.9%, Others: 1.8%)	0
Lucerne	25.8	2	13.7	2	27.9	3	15.4	1	8.1	1	6.5	0	2.6 (Note: EVP: 0.5%, SD: 0.1%, Others: 2.0%)	0
Neuchâtel	17.3	1	22.5	1	2.6	0	21.0	1	16.5	1	6.8	0	13.5 (Note: PdA: 11.7%, EVP: 1.1%, EDU: 0.7%)	0
Nidwalden	39.9	0	–	–	45.3	1	14.8	0	–	–	–	–	–	–
Obwalden	52.3	1	–	–	–	–	47.7	0	–	–	–	–	–	–
Schaffhausen	39.1	1	27.4	1	2.6	0	12.2	0	4.8	0	6.8	0	7.2 (Note: EVP: 2.5%, EDU: 1.7%, Others: 3.0%)	0
Schwyz	35.9	2	10.9	0	17.6	1	19.6	1	2.7	0	3.3	0	10.0 (Note: EVP: 0.5%, Others: 9.5%)	0
Solothurn	28.7	2	17.2	1	17.9	1	17.4	1	9.3	1	6.0	0	3.5 (Note: EVP: 1.5%, Others: 2.0%)	0
St. Gallen	34.5	5	12.7	2	18.8	2	14.4	2	8.7	1	5.8	0	4.9 (Note: EVP: 1.4%, EDU: 1.1%, SD: 0.2%, Others: 2.2%)	0
Thurgau	40.3	3	10.2	1	15.3	1	10.7	1	8.5	0	6.6	0	8.2 (Note: EDU: 2.8%, EVP: 2.4%, Others: 3.0%)	0
Ticino	15.1	2	12.5	1	17.7	1	21.1	2	9.1	1	1.5	0	23.0 (Note: Lega: 13.5%, Others: 9.5%)	1 (Note: Lega: 1)
Uri	35.3	0	–	–	62.4	1	–	–	–	–	–	–	2.3	0
Valais	24.5	2	14.3	1	35.4	3	14.7	1	8.4	1	2.0	0	0.7 (Note: PdA: 0.7%)	0
Vaud	19.2	4	25.3	6	4.5	1	22.4	4	13.5	3	7.5	1	7.6 (Note: PdA: 4.3%, EVP: 0.7%, EDU: 0.6%, Others: 2.0%)	0
Zug	30.2	1	5.2	0	24.9	1	13.0	0	16.2	1	6.2	0	4.3 (Note: EVP: 0.5%, Others: 3.8%)	0
Zürich	27.4	10	21.1	8	8.1	3	12.5	5	9.9	4	12.4	4	8.6 (Note: EVP: 2.8%, EDU: 1.5%, Feminist and Green Alternative Groups: 1.0%, PdA: 0.3%, SD: 0.1%, Others: 2.9%)	2 (Note: EVP: 1, EDU: 1)
Total	27.93	62	18.27	41	14.06	29	14.25	28	9.78	23	7.55	10	8.16	7
Source: FSO

=== Council of States ===
31 of the 46 seats of the Council of States were filled in the first round, with the remaining 15 seats filled in the second round on the 12 and 19 November.

Party	Seats			
Party	1st round	2nd round	Total	+/–
The Centre	10	5	15	New
The Liberals	9	2	11	–1
Social Democratic Party	5	4	9	0
Swiss People's Party	4	2	6	0
Green Party	3	0	3	–2
Geneva Citizens' Movement	0	1	1	+1
Green Liberal Party	0	1	1	+1
Total	31	15	46	0
Source: FSO

==== By canton ====
Canton	Centre	FDP	SP	SVP	Greens	MCG	GLP
Aargau	1	1					
Appenzell Ausserrhoden		1					
Appenzell Innerrhoden	1						
Basel-Landschaft					1		
Basel-Stadt			1				
Bern			1	1			
Fribourg	1	1					
Geneva			1			1	
Glarus		1			1		
Grisons	1	1					
Jura	1		1				
Lucerne	1	1					
Neuchâtel			1		1		
Nidwalden		1					
Obwalden	1						
Schaffhausen			1	1			
Schwyz		1		1			
Solothurn	1		1				
St. Gallen	1			1			
Thurgau	1			1			
Ticino	1			1			
Uri	1	1					
Valais	2						
Vaud		1	1				
Zug	1	1					
Zurich			1				1
Total	15	11	9	6	3	1	1
Source: FSO

== Electorate demographics ==
Demographic	SVP	SP	FDP	Centre	Greens	GLP
Total vote	27.9%	18.3%	14.3%	14.1%	9.8%	7.6%
Sex
Men	32%	14%	17%	14%	8%	8%
Women	24%	23%	12%	14%	12%	7%
Age
18–29 years old	23%	21%	11%	11%	16%	8%
30–45 years old	26%	18%	12%	14%	12%	8%
46–65 years old	31%	17%	14%	13%	9%	8%
Over 65 years old	28%	19%	19%	17%	5%	6%
Income
Under 4,000 CHF	31%	18%	10%	14%	11%	5%
4,000 - 6,000 CHF	24%	21%	14%	16%	10%	8%
6,001 – 10,000 CHF	27%	17%	18%	13%	10%	10%
Over 10,000 CHF	27%	11%	30%	11%	6%	11%
Education
Compulsory / VET	34%	17%	13%	15%	7%	6%
Matura / PET	26%	18%	15%	14%	11%	9%
University / Fachhochschule	12%	22%	16%	11%	18%	12%
Source: Sotomo

== Aftermath ==
Following the election, SVP President Marco Chiesa stated his party had "a clear mandate" and would seek "less political correctness" and to work with the other parties. Although smaller right-wing parties gained enough seats to form their own parliamentary group, they opted to remain in the SVP group.

On 25 October, the Federal Statistical Office announced it had miscalculated the national vote count; this resulted from "a programming error in the data import software for the cantons of Appenzell Inner Rhodes, Appenzell Outer Rhodes and Glarus." The corrected vote count did not affect the allocation of seats, but found the FDP remained the third largest party by vote share as opposed to The Centre.

The federal elections were followed on 13 December by the 2023 Swiss Federal Council election.
