= List of members of the Federal Assembly from the Canton of Vaud =

Coat of Arms

This is a list of members of both houses of the Federal Assembly from the Canton of Vaud.

== Members of the Council of States ==
Councillor (Party)	Election	Councillor (Party)
François Briatte; Free Democratic Party; 1848–1853	Appointed	J.-P.-Louis Wenger; Free Democratic Party; 1848–1849
François Briatte; Free Democratic Party; 1848–1853	Appointed	Emmanuel-David Bourgeois; Free Democratic Party; 1849–1851
François Briatte; Free Democratic Party; 1848–1853	Appointed	Jules Martin; Free Democratic Party; 1851–1852
François Briatte; Free Democratic Party; 1848–1853	Appointed	J.-Henri-S. Reymond; Free Democratic Party; 1852–1853
Ch.-E.-Constant Fornerod; Free Democratic Party; 1853–1855	Appointed	Ch.-Auguste Rogivue; Free Democratic Party; 1853–1853
Ch.-E.-Constant Fornerod; Free Democratic Party; 1853–1855	Appointed	Gustave-Ad. Jaccard; Liberal Party; 1854–1855
J.-P.-Louis Wenger; Free Democratic Party; 1855–1861	Appointed	Gustave-Ad. Jaccard; Liberal Party; 1854–1855
J.-P.-Louis Wenger; Free Democratic Party; 1855–1861	Appointed	François Briatte; Free Democratic Party; 1856–1862
Fr.-Xavier Gottofrey; Conservative; 1862–1862	Appointed	François Briatte; Free Democratic Party; 1856–1862
Jeannot Decrousnaz; Free Democratic Party; 1862–1863	Appointed	Jules-D. Eytel; Free Democratic Party; 1862–1863
Auguste de Loës; Liberal Party; 1863–1864	Appointed	Jules-L.-E. Roguin; Liberal Party; 1863–1874
François Briatte; Free Democratic Party; 1864–1867	Appointed	Jules-L.-E. Roguin; Liberal Party; 1863–1874
Charles Estoppey; Free Democratic Party; 1867–1873	Appointed	Jules-L.-E. Roguin; Liberal Party; 1863–1874
J.-F.-Louis Bonjour; Free Democratic Party; 1873–1875	Appointed	Jules-L.-E. Roguin; Liberal Party; 1863–1874
Charles Estoppey; Free Democratic Party; 1875–1888	Appointed	Ph.-Antoine Vessaz; Free Democratic Party; 1875–1878
Charles Estoppey; Free Democratic Party; 1875–1888	Appointed	Victor-O. Debonneville; Free Democratic Party; 1878–1880
Charles Estoppey; Free Democratic Party; 1875–1888	Appointed	Jules Brun; Free Democratic Party; 1880–1881
Charles Estoppey; Free Democratic Party; 1875–1888	Appointed	Alphonse Bory; Free Democratic Party; 1881–1887
Charles Estoppey; Free Democratic Party; 1875–1888	Appointed	Marc-Emile Ruchet; Free Democratic Party; 1887–1893
Adolphe Jordan; Free Democratic Party; 1888–1896	Appointed	Marc-Emile Ruchet; Free Democratic Party; 1887–1893
Adolphe Jordan; Free Democratic Party; 1888–1896	Appointed	Donat L. Golaz; Free Democratic Party; 1894–1900
Marc-Emile Ruchet; Free Democratic Party; 1896–1899	Appointed	Donat L. Golaz; Free Democratic Party; 1894–1900
F.-Alfred-J. Aubert; Free Democratic Party; 1900–1901	Appointed	Adrien F.-H. Thélin; Free Democratic Party; 1900–1917
Henri-François Simon; Free Democratic Party; 1901–1928	Appointed	Adrien F.-H. Thélin; Free Democratic Party; 1900–1917
Henri-François Simon; Free Democratic Party; 1901–1928	Appointed	Emile Dind; Free Democratic Party; 1917–1931
Norbert Bosset; Free Democratic Party; 1928–1947	Appointed	Emile Dind; Free Democratic Party; 1917–1931
Norbert Bosset; Free Democratic Party; 1928–1947	Appointed	Louis Chamorel; Free Democratic Party; 1931–1943
Norbert Bosset; Free Democratic Party; 1928–1947	Appointed	Gabriel Despland; Free Democratic Party; 1943–1944
Norbert Bosset; Free Democratic Party; 1928–1947	Appointed	Frédéric Fauquex; Liberal Party; 1945–1963
Gabriel Despland; Free Democratic Party; 1947–1967	1947	Frédéric Fauquex; Liberal Party; 1945–1963
Gabriel Despland; Free Democratic Party; 1947–1967	1951	Frédéric Fauquex; Liberal Party; 1945–1963
Gabriel Despland; Free Democratic Party; 1947–1967	1955	Frédéric Fauquex; Liberal Party; 1945–1963
Gabriel Despland; Free Democratic Party; 1947–1967	1959	Frédéric Fauquex; Liberal Party; 1945–1963
Gabriel Despland; Free Democratic Party; 1947–1967	1963	Louis Guisan; Liberal Party; 1963–1975
Jean-Pierre Pradervand; Free Democratic Party; 1967–1975	1967	Louis Guisan; Liberal Party; 1963–1975
Jean-Pierre Pradervand; Free Democratic Party; 1967–1975	1971	Louis Guisan; Liberal Party; 1963–1975
Jacques Morier-Genoud; Social Democratic Party; 1975–1979	1975	Edouard Debétaz; Free Democratic Party; 1975–1987
Hubert Reymond; Liberal Party; 1979–1995	1979	Edouard Debétaz; Free Democratic Party; 1975–1987
Hubert Reymond; Liberal Party; 1979–1995	1983	Edouard Debétaz; Free Democratic Party; 1975–1987
Hubert Reymond; Liberal Party; 1979–1995	1987	Yvette Jaggi; Social Democratic Party; 1987–1991
Hubert Reymond; Liberal Party; 1979–1995	1991	Jacques Martin; Free Democratic Party; 1991–1999
Eric Rochat; Liberal Party; 1995–1999	1995	Jacques Martin; Free Democratic Party; 1991–1999
Michel Béguelin; Social Democratic Party; 1999–2007	1999	Christiane Langenberger; Free Democratic Party; 1999–2007
Michel Béguelin; Social Democratic Party; 1999–2007	2003	Christiane Langenberger; Free Democratic Party; 1999–2007
Géraldine Savary; Social Democratic Party; 2007–2019	2007	Luc Recordon; Green Party; 2007–2015
Géraldine Savary; Social Democratic Party; 2007–2019	2011	Luc Recordon; Green Party; 2007–2015
Géraldine Savary; Social Democratic Party; 2007–2019	2015	Olivier Français; FDP.The Liberals; 2015–2023
Adèle Thorens Goumaz; Green Party; 2019–2023	2019	Olivier Français; FDP.The Liberals; 2015–2023
Pierre-Yves Maillard; Social Democratic Party; 2023–present	2023	Pascal Broulis; FDP.The Liberals; 2023–present

== Members of the National Council ==
Councillor	Party	Term start	Term end
J.-François Bettex	FDP/PRD	1848	1851
Louis Blanchenay	FDP/PRD	1848	1860
Jules-D. Eytel	FDP/PRD	1848	1851
Daniel-Salomon Grivaz	FDP/PRD	1848	1851
Abram-Daniel Meystre	FDP/PRD	1848	1851
M.-L.-J.-Benjamin Pittet	FDP/PRD	1848	1851
Jean-Rodolphe Soutter	FDP/PRD	1848	1850
C.-J.-François Veillon	FDP/PRD	1848	1851
Charles-G.-D. Vittel	FDP/PRD	1848	1851
Vincent Kehrwand	FDP/PRD	1850	1857
Charles-P.-E. Bontems	Liberal	1851	1854
Justin Bornand	FDP/PRD	1851	1853
Emmanuel-David Bourgeois	Liberal	1851	1854
J.-S.-Edouard Dapples	Liberal	1851	1854
Auguste de Loës	Liberal	1851	1854
François Thury	FDP/PRD	1851	1857
J.-P.-Louis Wenger	FDP/PRD	1851	1854
Charles Estoppey	FDP/PRD	1852	1863
Abram-Daniel Meystre	FDP/PRD	1853	1855
M.-Benjamin Bonard	FDP/PRD	1854	1857
Edouard Cherix	FDP/PRD	1854	1857
J.-Frédéric-H. Fonjallaz	FDP/PRD	1854	1857
Jules Martin	FDP/PRD	1854	1860
Georges-Adolphe Flaction	FDP/PRD	1855	1857
P.-Samuel Déglon	FDP/PRD	1856	1862
Jean-Louis Ancrenaz	FDP/PRD	1857	1866
Charles-P.-E. Bontems	Liberal	1857	1869
J.-S.-Edouard Dapples	Liberal	1857	1866
J.-B.-Louis de Demiéville	Liberal	1857	1876
J.-Louis-Henri Delarageaz	FDP/PRD	1857	1881
Victor-Ch.-F. Ruffy	FDP/PRD	1858	1860
François-S. Corboz	Liberal	1860	1866
Ch.-Henri-F- Jan	Liberal	1860	1863
Victor-Ch.-F. Ruffy	FDP/PRD	1861	1867
Charles Burnand	Liberal	1862	1863
John (Jean-M.-E.) Berney	CentreG	1863	1866
Jules-D. Eytel	FDP/PRD	1863	1866
Abram-Daniel Meystre	FDP/PRD	1863	1870
Charles-F. Cossy	CentreD	1864	1875
David E. Bachelard	FDP/PRD	1866	1866
Charles-H.-A. Baud	FDP/PRD	1866	1893
Paul-J. Cérésole	Liberal	1866	1870
J.-Henri-S. Reymond	FDP/PRD	1866	1877
Louis-A.-J. Ruchonnet	FDP/PRD	1866	1881
F.-Victor Perrin	FDP/PRD	1867	1872
Charles-L. Duplan	Ind.	1868	1869
Georges L. Contesse	FDP/PRD	1869	1882
Jules-D. Eytel	FDP/PRD	1870	1873
Henri-Louis Rambert	Liberal	1870	1872
Paul Ch. Wulliémoz	FDP/PRD	1871	1883
Jakob Dubs	Liberal	1872	1875
P.-Isaac Joly	FDP/PRD	1872	1878
Louis-F.-J.-M. Berdez	Liberal	1873	1877
Frédéric Chausson	FDP/PRD	1875	1876
Louis Mayor	FDP/PRD	1876	1878
Marc Morel	Liberal	1876	1878
Théodore Du Plessis	Liberal	1877	1879
Jules Vautier	Liberal	1877	1878
Abraham-N. Vourloud	Ind.	1877	1878
Paul André	FDP/PRD	1878	1881
Charles M. S. Boiceau	Liberal	1878	1881
Frédéric Criblet	FDP/PRD	1878	1886
Aymon de Gingins	Liberal	1878	1881
Ph.-Antoine Vessaz	FDP/PRD	1878	1883
Jules Colomb	FDP/PRD	1879	1893
Jules Brun	FDP/PRD	1881	1882
F.-David Joly	FDP/PRD	1881	1883
Adolphe Jordan	FDP/PRD	1881	1883
Louis Mayor	FDP/PRD	1881	1887
Henri Oguey	FDP/PRD	1881	1883
Samuel Cuénoud	FDP/PRD	1882	1884
Lucien Decoppet	FDP/PRD	1882	1883
Eugène Ruffy	FDP/PRD	1882	1893
Louis Chausson	FDP/PRD	1883	1899
P.-Louis Déglon	FDP/PRD	1883	1899
Donat L. Golaz	FDP/PRD	1883	1885
Louis Paschoud	FDP/PRD	1883	1893
Adrien F.-H. Thélin	FDP/PRD	1883	1900
Jacques-François Viquerat	FDP/PRD	1883	1896
Jean-F. Cavat	FDP/PRD	1885	1911
Charles-Eugène Fonjallaz	FDP/PRD	1885	1908
Ami-A. Campiche	FDP/PRD	1886	1891
J.-Francis-A. Pernoux	FDP/PRD	1888	1893
Emile Paillard	FDP/PRD	1891	1902
Charles M. S. Boiceau	Liberal	1893	1899
Paul-J. Cérésole	Liberal	1893	1899
Ernest-Ed. Decollogny	FDP/PRD	1893	1896
Louis-Charles Delarageaz	LPS/PLS	1893	1906
Emile-Louis Gaudard	FDP/PRD	1893	1928
Adolphe Jordan	FDP/PRD	1896	1900
Juste-François Lagier	FDP/PRD	1896	1914
Alois de Meuron	LPS/PLS	1899	1928
Camille Decoppet	FDP/PRD	1899	1912
A.-Isaac Oyex	FDP/PRD	1899	1910
Edouard-H. Secrétan	LPS/PLS	1899	1917
Ernest Rubattel	FDP/PRD	1900	1906
Henri-A.-F. Thélin	FDP/PRD	1900	1912
Alphonse Dubuis	FDP/PRD	1902	1913
Jules-H. Roulet	Liberal	1902	1911
Emile Vuichoud	LPS/PLS	1902	1906
Eugène J. Bugnon	FDP/PRD	1906	1911
Alexandre Emery	LPS/PLS	1906	1917
Ernest-L. Chuard	FDP/PRD	1907	1919
Félix Bonjour	FDP/PRD	1908	1917
Charles-Eugène Fonjallaz	FDP/PRD	1910	1917
Ulysse Crisinel	FDP/PRD	1911	1913
Maurice-H.-G. Desplands	FDP/PRD	1911	1914
Paul Maillefer	FDP/PRD	1911	1929
Armand W. Piguet	LPS/PLS	1911	1925
J.-F.-Henri Grobet	FDP/PRD	1912	1922
J.-Alfred Jaton	FDP/PRD	1912	1925
Louis-H. Reymond	FDP/PRD	1912	1919
Frédéric Gérard Bosset	FDP/PRD	1913	1922
Alfred L. Pilliod	FDP/PRD	1913	1917
John Henri Mermoud	FDP/PRD	1914	1919
Jean Yersin	LPS/PLS	1914	1919
Henri Bersier	FDP/PRD	1917	1924
Gustave-François Bettex	FDP/PRD	1917	1921
Henri Chenaux	FDP/PRD	1917	1919
Robert Cossy	LPS/PLS	1917	1920
Max de Cérenville	LPS/PLS	1917	1919
A.-Isaac Oyex	FDP/PRD	1917	1917
Louis Chamorel	FDP/PRD	1919	1931
Charles-Théophile Naine	SP/PS	1919	1926
Paul Perrin	SP/PS	1919	1953
Paul-C. Pittet	FDP/PRD	1919	1924
Auguste-Emile Roussy	LPS/PLS	1919	1922
Henri-Auguste Viret	SP/PS	1919	1922
Max de Cérenville	LPS/PLS	1920	1922
Louis-Ernest Mayor	FDP/PRD	1921	1922
Maurice Bujard	LPS/PLS	1922	1935
Ferdinand Cornaz	LPS/PLS	1922	1925
Edouard Fazan	FDP/PRD	1922	1935
Lucien Mercier	SP/PS	1922	1931
Sidney Schopfer	FDP/PRD	1922	1925
Albert Wuilliamoz	PAB	1922	1931
J.-F.-Henri Grobet	FDP/PRD	1924	1928
Henri Pitton	FDP/PRD	1924	1935
Jean de Muralt	LPS/PLS	1925	1935
Paul Golay	SP/PS	1925	1942
Eugène Masson	SP/PS	1925	1934
Marcel-Edouard-Ernest Pilet-Golaz	FDP/PRD	1925	1928
Henri-François-Jules Vallotton	FDP/PRD	1925	1943
Jules Mayor	FDP/PRD	1928	1935
John-Edouard Mermod	FDP/PRD	1928	1936
Maurice Paschoud	FDP/PRD	1928	1930
Louis-Samuel Roulet	PAB	1928	1955
Robert Bredaz	FDP/PRD	1929	1931
David Dénéréaz	FDP/PRD	1930	1931
Louis Béguin	FDP/PRD	1931	1935
Ernest Gloor	SP/PS	1931	1941
Charles Gorgerat	LPS/PLS	1931	1943
Paul-Jean Perret	FDP/PRD	1931	1931
Pierre Rochat	FDP/PRD	1931	1944
Georges Junod	SP/PS	1934	1939
Henry Cottier	FDP/PRD	1935	1951
Frédéric Fauquex	LPS/PLS	1935	1945
Charles-Albert Favrod-Coune	LPS/PLS	1935	1939
Eugène Hirzel	FDP/PRD	1935	1951
Albert Paschoud	FDP/PRD	1935	1943
Benjamin Schwar	PAB	1935	1943
Henri-Louis Jaccottet	FDP/PRD	1936	1939
Eugène Masson	FSS	1939	1941
Armand Melly	FDP/PRD	1939	1947
Antoine Vodoz	LPS/PLS	1939	1945
Gabriel Despland	FDP/PRD	1941	1943
Lucien Rubattel	LPS/PLS	1941	1955
Pierre Graber	SP/PS	1942	1962
Jules-Henri Addor	FDP/PRD	1943	1947
Albert Brochon	PAB	1943	1947
Paul Chaudet	FDP/PRD	1943	1954
Paul Nerfin	FDP/PRD	1943	1946
Robert Piot	FDP/PRD	1943	1959
Albert von der Aa	SP/PS	1943	1946
Ulysse Péclard	FDP/PRD	1944	1951
Maurice Baudat	LPS/PLS	1945	1947
François Devenoge	LPS/PLS	1945	1957
Henri Anet	FDP/PRD	1946	1947
Richard Bringolf	SP/PS	1946	1966
Georges Bridel	LPS/PLS	1947	1951
Armand-Auguste Forel	PdA/PST	1947	1951
Maurice Jeanneret	PdA/PST	1947	1952
Adrien Miéville	PdA/PST	1947	1950
Ernest Pidoux	FDP/PRD	1947	1967
René-Albert Houriet	PdA/PST	1950	1951
Henri Badoux	FDP/PRD	1951	1959
Paul Frainier	Conservative	1951	1955
Jules Grandjean	FDP/PRD	1951	1967
Michel Jaccard	FDP/PRD	1951	1955
Jean Peitrequin	FDP/PRD	1951	1955
Charles Sollberger	SP/PS	1951	1967
André Muret	PdA/PST	1952	1959
Henri Monfrini	SP/PS	1953	1963
Albert Brochon	PAB	1955	1967
Samuel Chevalley	FDP/PRD	1955	1956
Armand-Auguste Forel	PdA/PST	1955	1983
Louis Guisan	LPS/PLS	1955	1963
Alfred Jaunin	FDP/PRD	1955	1967
René Villard	SP/PS	1955	1958
Jacques Chamorel	LPS/PLS	1957	1962
Marcel Brawand	SP/PS	1958	1959
Georges-André Chevallaz	FDP/PRD	1959	1973
Paul Frainier	CCS	1959	1962
Alix Jaccard	SP/PS	1959	1963
Jean-Pierre Pradervand	FDP/PRD	1959	1966
Raymond Baudère	CCS	1962	1967
Marcel Brawand	SP/PS	1962	1971
Pierre Graber	SP/PS	1963	1969
Georges Jaccottet	LPS/PLS	1963	1971
André Muret	PdA/PST	1963	1979
Georges Thévoz	LPS/PLS	1963	1987
André Martin	FDP/PRD	1966	1975
Gilbert Baechtold	SP/PS	1967	1983
Alfred Bussey	SP/PS	1967	1979
Jean-Jacques Cevey	FDP/PRD	1967	1991
Pierre Freymond	FDP/PRD	1967	1971
Raymond Junod	FDP/PRD	1967	1974
Roger Mugny	CCS	1967	1979
Pierre Teuscher	PAB	1967	1983
Pierre Duvanel	SP/PS	1970	1975
Claude Bonnard	LPS/PLS	1971	1987
Georges Breny	N	1971	1975
Maurice Cossy	FDP/PRD	1971	1971
Bernard Meizoz	SP/PS	1971	1991
Maurice Cossy	FDP/PRD	1974	1979
Gertrude Girard	FDP/PRD	1974	1983
Roger Besuchet	SP/PS	1975	1979
Jean-Pascal Delamuraz	FDP/PRD	1975	1983
Jean-Philippe Gloor	SP/PS	1975	1987
Raymond Junod	FDP/PRD	1975	1983
Daniel Brélaz	GPS/PES	1979	1989
Pierre Duvoisin	SP/PS	1979	1982
Yvette Jaggi	SP/PS	1979	1987
Jacques Martin	FDP/PRD	1979	1988
Claude Massy	LPS/PLS	1979	1991
Victor Ruffy	SP/PS	1982	1995
Jean-Pierre Berger	SVP/UDC	1983	1995
Pierre-David Candaux	FDP/PRD	1983	1987
Marcel Dubois	FDP/PRD	1983	1987
André Perey	FDP/PRD	1983	1995
Philippe Pidoux	FDP/PRD	1983	1995
Françoise Pitteloud	SP/PS	1983	1991
Pierre Savary	FDP/PRD	1984	1995
Pierre Aguet	SP/PS	1987	1995
Michel Béguelin	SP/PS	1987	1995
Charles Friderici	LPS/PLS	1987	1995
Francine Jeanprêtre	SP/PS	1987	1995
Jean-François Leuba	LPS/PLS	1987	1995
Paul-René Martin	FDP/PRD	1987	1991
Irène Gardiol	GPS/PES	1990	1994
Olivier Chevallaz	FDP/PRD	1991	1995
Pierre Duvoisin	SP/PS	1991	1995
Philippe Mamie	FDP/PRD	1991	1995
Jean-Marc Narbel	LPS/PLS	1991	1995
Suzette Sandoz	LPS/PLS	1991	1995
Josef Zisyadis	PdA/PST	1991	1995
Roland Ostermann	GPS/PES	1994	1995
Pierre Aguet	SP/PS	1995	1999
Michel Béguelin	SP/PS	1995	1999
Emmanuella Blaser	SVP/UDC	1995	1999
Pierre Chiffelle	SP/PS	1995	2002
Yves Christen	FDP/PRD	1995	2006
Charles Friderici	LPS/PLS	1995	1999
Yves Guisan	FDP/PRD	1995	2003
Francine Jeanprêtre	SP/PS	1995	1999
Christiane Langenberger	FDP/PRD	1995	1999
Jean-François Leuba	LPS/PLS	1995	1998
Roland Ostermann	GPS/PES	1995	1999
Philippe Pidoux	FDP/PRD	1995	1999
Victor Ruffy	SP/PS	1995	1999
Marcel Sandoz	FDP/PRD	1995	2003
Suzette Sandoz	LPS/PLS	1995	1998
Jean-Charles Simon	CVP/PDC	1995	1999
Josef Zisyadis	PdA/PST	1995	1996
Christiane Jaquet-Berger	PdA/PST	1996	1999
Serge Beck	LPS/PLS	1998	2007
Marguerite Florio	LPS/PLS	1998	1999
André Bugnon	SVP/UDC	1999	2015
Marlyse Dormond	SP/PS	1999	2007
Jean Fattebert	SVP/UDC	1999	2007
Charles Favre	FDP/PRD	1999	2011
Pierre-Yves Maillard	SP/PS	1999	2004
Anne-Catherine Menétrey-Savary	GPS/PES	1999	2007
Jacques Neirynck	CVP/PDC	1999	2003
Claude Ruey	LPS/PLS	1999	2011
Jean Jacques Schwaab	SP/PS	1999	2003
Pierre Tillmanns	SP/PS	1999	2003
René Vaudroz	FDP/PRD	1999	2007
Josef Zisyadis	PdA/PST	1999	2011
Pierre Salvi	SP/PS	2002	2007
Yves Guisan	FDP/PRD	2003	2007
Marianne Huguenin	PdA/PST	2003	2007
Guy Parmelin	SVP/UDC	2003	2015
Luc Recordon	GPS/PES	2003	2007
Géraldine Savary	SP/PS	2003	2007
Pierre-François Veillon	SVP/UDC	2003	2015
Roger Nordmann	SP/PS	2004	Incumbent
Isabelle Moret	FDP/PRD	2006	Incumbent
Josiane Aubert	SP/PS	2007	2014
Daniel Brélaz	GPS/PES	2007	2011
Olivier Français	FDP/PRD	2007	2015
Alice Glauser-Zufferey	SVP/UDC	2007	2011
Jean-Pierre Grin	SVP/UDC	2007	Incumbent
Ada Marra	SP/PS	2007	Incumbent
Jacques Neirynck	CVP/PDC	2007	2011
Adèle Thorens Goumaz	GPS/PES	2007	Incumbent
Christian van Singer	GPS/PES	2007	2015
Eric Voruz	SP/PS	2007	2015
Cesla Amarelle	SP/PS	2011	2017
Isabelle Chevalley	GLP/PVL	2011	Incumbent
Fathi Derder	FDP/PLR	2011	Incumbent
Olivier Feller	FDP/PLR	2011	Incumbent
Jacques Neirynck	CVP/PDC	2011	2015
Jean Christophe Schwaab	SP/PS	2011	2017
Rebecca Ana Ruiz	SP/PS	2014	Incumbent
Claude Béglé	CVP/PDC	2015	Incumbent
Frédéric Borloz	FDP/PLR	2015	Incumbent
Daniel Brélaz	GPS/PES	2015	Incumbent
Michaël Buffat	SVP/UDC	2015	Incumbent
Jacques Nicolet	SVP/UDC	2015	Incumbent
Laurent Wehrli	FDP/PLR	2015	Incumbent
Alice Glauser-Zufferey	SVP/UDC	2016	Incumbent
Samuel Bendahan	SP/PS	2017	Incumbent
Brigitte Crottaz	SP/PS	2018	Incumbent
