= List of members of the Federal Assembly from the Canton of Thurgau =

Coat of Arms

This is a list of members of both houses of the Federal Assembly from the Canton of Thurgau.

== Members of the Council of States ==
Councillor (Party)	Election	Councillor (Party)
Johann Karl Kappeler; Party unknown 1848–1881	Appointed	Johann Baptist von Streng; Liberal Party; 1848–1850
Johann Karl Kappeler; Party unknown 1848–1881	Appointed	Johann Keller; Liberal Party; 1850–1851
Johann Karl Kappeler; Party unknown 1848–1881	Appointed	Jakob Albrecht; Liberal Party; 1851–1851
Johann Karl Kappeler; Party unknown 1848–1881	Appointed	K. Eduard Häberlin; Liberal Party; 1851–1855
Johann Karl Kappeler; Party unknown 1848–1881	Appointed	Johann Conrad Kern; Liberal Party; 1855–1857
Johann Karl Kappeler; Party unknown 1848–1881	Appointed	K. Eduard Häberlin; Liberal Party; 1857–1860
Johann Karl Kappeler; Party unknown 1848–1881	Appointed	K. Eduard Häberlin; Liberal Party; 1860–1869
Johann Karl Kappeler; Party unknown 1848–1881	Appointed	Paul Nagel; Liberal Party; 1869–1880
Johann Karl Kappeler; Party unknown 1848–1881	Appointed	Johannes Altwegg; Free Democratic Party; 1880–1888
Jak. Albert Scherb; Swiss Democrats; 1881–1908	Appointed	Johannes Altwegg; Free Democratic Party; 1880–1888
Jak. Albert Scherb; Swiss Democrats; 1881–1908	Appointed	Johann Ulrich Baumann; Swiss Democrats; 1889–1890
Jak. Albert Scherb; Swiss Democrats; 1881–1908	Appointed	Joh. Georg Leumann; Free Democratic Party; 1890–1918
G. Adolf Deucher; Swiss Democrats; 1908–1910	Appointed	Joh. Georg Leumann; Free Democratic Party; 1890–1918
Albert Böhi; Free Democratic Party; 1910–1935	Appointed	Joh. Georg Leumann; Free Democratic Party; 1890–1918
Albert Böhi; Free Democratic Party; 1910–1935	Appointed	A. Otto Aepli; Free Democratic Party; 1919–1921
Albert Böhi; Free Democratic Party; 1910–1935	Appointed	Rudolf Huber; Free Democratic Party; 1921–1928
Albert Böhi; Free Democratic Party; 1910–1935	1922	Rudolf Huber; Free Democratic Party; 1921–1928
Albert Böhi; Free Democratic Party; 1910–1935	1925	Rudolf Huber; Free Democratic Party; 1921–1928
Albert Böhi; Free Democratic Party; 1910–1935	1928	Anton Schmid; Paysans, Artisans et Bourgeois; 1928–1935
Albert Böhi; Free Democratic Party; 1910–1935	1931	Anton Schmid; Paysans, Artisans et Bourgeois; 1928–1935
Paul Altwegg; Free Democratic Party; 1935–1951	1935	Eduard Pfister; Paysans, Artisans et Bourgeois; 1935–1939
Paul Altwegg; Free Democratic Party; 1935–1951	1939	Erich Ullmann; Paysans, Artisans et Bourgeois; 1939–1963
Paul Altwegg; Free Democratic Party; 1935–1951	1943	Erich Ullmann; Paysans, Artisans et Bourgeois; 1939–1963
Paul Altwegg; Free Democratic Party; 1935–1951	1947	Erich Ullmann; Paysans, Artisans et Bourgeois; 1939–1963
Jakob Müller; Free Democratic Party; 1951–1967	1951	Erich Ullmann; Paysans, Artisans et Bourgeois; 1939–1963
Jakob Müller; Free Democratic Party; 1951–1967	1955	Erich Ullmann; Paysans, Artisans et Bourgeois; 1939–1963
Jakob Müller; Free Democratic Party; 1951–1967	1959	Erich Ullmann; Paysans, Artisans et Bourgeois; 1939–1963
Jakob Müller; Free Democratic Party; 1951–1967	1963	Heinrich Herzog; Paysans, Artisans et Bourgeois; 1963–1979
Hans Munz; Free Democratic Party; 1967–1983	1967	Heinrich Herzog; Paysans, Artisans et Bourgeois; 1963–1979
Hans Munz; Free Democratic Party; 1967–1983	1971	Heinrich Herzog; Paysans, Artisans et Bourgeois; 1963–1979
Hans Munz; Free Democratic Party; 1967–1983	1975	Heinrich Herzog; Paysans, Artisans et Bourgeois; 1963–1979
Hans Munz; Free Democratic Party; 1967–1983	1979	Franco Matossi; Swiss People's Party; 1979–1987
Heinz Moll; Free Democratic Party; 1983–1987	1983	Franco Matossi; Swiss People's Party; 1979–1987
Thomas Onken; Social Democratic Party; 1987–1999	1987	Hans Uhlmann; Swiss People's Party; 1987–1999
Thomas Onken; Social Democratic Party; 1987–1999	1991	Hans Uhlmann; Swiss People's Party; 1987–1999
Thomas Onken; Social Democratic Party; 1987–1999	1995	Hans Uhlmann; Swiss People's Party; 1987–1999
Philipp Stähelin; Christian Democratic People's Party; 1999–2011	1999	Hermann Bürgi; Swiss People's Party; 1999–2011
Philipp Stähelin; Christian Democratic People's Party; 1999–2011	2003	Hermann Bürgi; Swiss People's Party; 1999–2011
Philipp Stähelin; Christian Democratic People's Party; 1999–2011	2007	Hermann Bürgi; Swiss People's Party; 1999–2011
Brigitte Häberli-Koller; Christian Democratic People's Party; 2011–2023; The Centre; 2023–present	2011	Roland Eberle; Swiss People's Party; 2011–2019
Brigitte Häberli-Koller; Christian Democratic People's Party; 2011–2023; The Centre; 2023–present	2015	Roland Eberle; Swiss People's Party; 2011–2019
Brigitte Häberli-Koller; Christian Democratic People's Party; 2011–2023; The Centre; 2023–present	2019	Jakob Stark; Swiss People's Party; 2019–present
Brigitte Häberli-Koller; Christian Democratic People's Party; 2011–2023; The Centre; 2023–present	2023	Jakob Stark; Swiss People's Party; 2019–present

== Members of the National Council ==
Election	Councillor (Party)	Councillor (Party)	Councillor (Party)	Councillor (Party)	Councillor (Party)	Councillor (Party)	Councillor (Party)
1848	Johann Conrad Kern (Liberal)	Johann Georg Kreis (Liberal)	Philipp Gottlieb Labhardt (Liberal)	Johann Georg Rauch (Liberal)	4 seats 1848–1863		
1851	Johann Conrad Kern (Liberal)	Johann Georg Kreis (Liberal)	K. Eduard Häberlin (Liberal)	Johann Ludwig Sulzberger (Liberal)	4 seats 1848–1863		
1854	Johann Baptist von Streng (Liberal)	Johann Georg Kreis (Liberal)	K. Eduard Häberlin (Liberal)	Johann Ludwig Sulzberger (Liberal)	4 seats 1848–1863		
1857	Johann Baptist von Streng (Liberal)	Johann Georg Kreis (Liberal)	Johann Messmer (Liberal)	Johann Ludwig Sulzberger (Liberal)	4 seats 1848–1863		
1860	Johann Baptist von Streng (Liberal)	Johann Georg Kreis (Liberal)	Johann Messmer (Liberal)	Johann Ludwig Sulzberger (Liberal)	4 seats 1848–1863		
1863	Jos. Fridolin Anderwert (SD/DS)	Johann Joachim Lüthi (Liberal)	Johann Messmer (Liberal)	Johann Ludwig Sulzberger (Liberal)	Augustin Ramsperger (Conservative)	5 seats 1863–1902	
1865	Jos. Fridolin Anderwert (SD/DS)	Philipp Gottlieb Labhardt (Liberal)	Johann Messmer (Liberal)	Johann Ludwig Sulzberger (Liberal)	Augustin Ramsperger (Conservative)	5 seats 1863–1902	
1866	Jos. Fridolin Anderwert (SD/DS)	Philipp Gottlieb Labhardt (Liberal)	Johann Messmer (Liberal)	Johann Ludwig Sulzberger (Liberal)	Augustin Ramsperger (Conservative)	5 seats 1863–1902	
1869	Jos. Fridolin Anderwert (SD/DS)	Adolf K. W. Deucher (SD/DS)	Johann Messmer (Liberal)	Johann Jakob Häberlin (Liberal)	Jak. Albert Scherb (SD/DS)	5 seats 1863–1902	
1872	Jos. Fridolin Anderwert (SD/DS)	Severin Stoffel (SD/DS)	Johann Messmer (Liberal)	Johann Jakob Häberlin (Liberal)	Jak. Albert Scherb (SD/DS)	5 seats 1863–1902	
1873	Jos. Fridolin Anderwert (SD/DS)	Severin Stoffel (SD/DS)	Johann Messmer (Liberal)	Fr. Heinrich Häberlin (FDP/PRD)	Jak. Albert Scherb (SD/DS)	5 seats 1863–1902	
1875	Gustave Merkle (Liberal)	Severin Stoffel (SD/DS)	Johann Messmer (Liberal)	Fr. Heinrich Häberlin (FDP/PRD)	Jak. Albert Scherb (SD/DS)	5 seats 1863–1902	
1878	Gustave Merkle (Liberal)	Severin Stoffel (SD/DS)	Johann Messmer (Liberal)	Fr. Heinrich Häberlin (FDP/PRD)	Jak. Albert Scherb (SD/DS)	5 seats 1863–1902	
1879	Gustave Merkle (Liberal)	Adolf K. W. Deucher (SD/DS)	Johann Messmer (Liberal)	Fr. Heinrich Häberlin (FDP/PRD)	Jak. Albert Scherb (SD/DS)	5 seats 1863–1902	
1880	Gustave Merkle (Liberal)	Adolf K. W. Deucher (SD/DS)	Joh. Philipp Heitz (FDP/PRD)	Fr. Heinrich Häberlin (FDP/PRD)	Jak. Albert Scherb (SD/DS)	5 seats 1863–1902	
1881	Gustave Merkle (Liberal)	Adolf K. W. Deucher (SD/DS)	Joh. Philipp Heitz (FDP/PRD)	Fr. Heinrich Häberlin (FDP/PRD)	Jakob H. Bachmann (FDP/PRD)	5 seats 1863–1902	
1883	Gustave Merkle (Liberal)	Johann Jakob Schümperlin (FDP/PRD)	Joh. Philipp Heitz (FDP/PRD)	Fr. Heinrich Häberlin (FDP/PRD)	Jakob H. Bachmann (FDP/PRD)	5 seats 1863–1902	
1884	Gustave Merkle (Liberal)	Johann Jakob Schümperlin (FDP/PRD)	Joh. Philipp Heitz (FDP/PRD)	Fr. Heinrich Häberlin (FDP/PRD)	Jakob H. Bachmann (FDP/PRD)	5 seats 1863–1902	
1887	Gustave Merkle (Liberal)	Johann Jakob Schümperlin (FDP/PRD)	Joh. Philipp Heitz (FDP/PRD)	Fr. Heinrich Häberlin (FDP/PRD)	Jakob H. Bachmann (FDP/PRD)	5 seats 1863–1902	
1889	Gustave Merkle (Liberal)	Karl Alfred Fehr (FDP/PRD)	Joh. Philipp Heitz (FDP/PRD)	Fr. Heinrich Häberlin (FDP/PRD)	Jakob H. Bachmann (FDP/PRD)	5 seats 1863–1902	
1890	Gustave Merkle (Liberal)	Karl Alfred Fehr (FDP/PRD)	Josef Anton Koch (Grut*)	Fr. Heinrich Häberlin (FDP/PRD)	Jakob H. Bachmann (FDP/PRD)	5 seats 1863–1902	
1893	Gustave Merkle (Liberal)	Karl Alfred Fehr (FDP/PRD)	Josef Anton Koch (Grut*)	Fr. Heinrich Häberlin (FDP/PRD)	Jakob H. Bachmann (FDP/PRD)	5 seats 1863–1902	
1896	Gustave Merkle (Liberal)	Karl Alfred Fehr (FDP/PRD)	Josef Anton Koch (Grut*)	Fr. Heinrich Häberlin (FDP/PRD)	Adolf Germann (FDP/PRD)	5 seats 1863–1902	
1897	Gustave Merkle (Liberal)	Karl Alfred Fehr (FDP/PRD)	Josef Anton Koch (Grut*)	Joh. Konrad Egloff (FDP/PRD)	Adolf Germann (FDP/PRD)	5 seats 1863–1902	
1898	Gustave Merkle (Liberal)	Karl Alfred Fehr (FDP/PRD)	Emil Hofmann (SD/DS)	Joh. Konrad Egloff (FDP/PRD)	Adolf Germann (FDP/PRD)	5 seats 1863–1902	
1899	Carl Eigenmann (PAB)	Karl Alfred Fehr (FDP/PRD)	Emil Hofmann (SD/DS)	Joh. Konrad Egloff (FDP/PRD)	Adolf Germann (FDP/PRD)	5 seats 1863–1902	
1902	Carl Eigenmann (PAB)	Karl Alfred Fehr (FDP/PRD)	Emil Hofmann (SD/DS)	Joh. Konrad Egloff (FDP/PRD)	Adolf Germann (FDP/PRD)	Jakob Müller (FDP/PRD)	6 seats 1902–1911
1904	Carl Eigenmann (PAB)	Heinrich Häberlin (FDP/PRD)	Emil Hofmann (SD/DS)	Alfons von Streng (Conservative)	Adolf Germann (FDP/PRD)	Jakob Müller (FDP/PRD)	6 seats 1902–1911
1905	Carl Eigenmann (PAB)	Heinrich Häberlin (FDP/PRD)	Emil Hofmann (SD/DS)	Alfons von Streng (Conservative)	Adolf Germann (FDP/PRD)	Jakob Müller (FDP/PRD)	6 seats 1902–1911
1908	Carl Eigenmann (PAB)	Heinrich Häberlin (FDP/PRD)	Emil Hofmann (SD/DS)	Alfons von Streng (Conservative)	Adolf Germann (FDP/PRD)	Jakob Müller (FDP/PRD)	6 seats 1902–1911
1911	Carl Eigenmann (PAB)	Heinrich Häberlin (FDP/PRD)	Emil Hofmann (SD/DS)	Alfons von Streng (Conservative)	Adolf Germann (FDP/PRD)	Jakob Müller (FDP/PRD)	Oskar Ullmann (FDP/PRD)
1914	Carl Eigenmann (PAB)	Heinrich Häberlin (FDP/PRD)	Emil Hofmann (SD/DS)	Alfons von Streng (Conservative)	Jakob Zingg (FDP/PRD)	Jakob Müller (FDP/PRD)	Oskar Ullmann (FDP/PRD)
1917	Carl Eigenmann (PAB)	Heinrich Häberlin (FDP/PRD)	Emil Hofmann (SD/DS)	Alfons von Streng (Conservative)	Jakob Zingg (FDP/PRD)	Jakob Müller (FDP/PRD)	Oskar Ullmann (FDP/PRD)
1919	Carl Eigenmann (PAB)	Heinrich Häberlin (FDP/PRD)	Emil Hofmann (SD/DS)	Alfons von Streng (Conservative)	Jakob Zingg (FDP/PRD)	Otto Höppli (SP/PS)	Oskar Ullmann (FDP/PRD)
1920	Carl Eigenmann (PAB)	A. Eduard Fehr (FDP/PRD)	Emil Hofmann (SD/DS)	Alfons von Streng (Conservative)	Jakob Meili (PAB)	Otto Höppli (SP/PS)	Oskar Ullmann (FDP/PRD)
1922	Carl Eigenmann (PAB)	Eduard Pfister (PAB)	Emil Hofmann (SD/DS)	Alfons von Streng (Conservative)	Jakob Meili (PAB)	Otto Höppli (SP/PS)	Oskar Ullmann (FDP/PRD)
1925	Carl Eigenmann (PAB)	Eduard Pfister (PAB)	Emil Hofmann (SD/DS)	Alfons von Streng (Conservative)	Jakob Meili (PAB)	Otto Höppli (SP/PS)	Oskar Ullmann (FDP/PRD)
1927	Carl Eigenmann (PAB)	Eduard Pfister (PAB)	Johann Lymann (SD/DS)	Alfons von Streng (Conservative)	Jakob Meili (PAB)	Otto Höppli (SP/PS)	Oskar Ullmann (FDP/PRD)
1928	Carl Eigenmann (PAB)	Eduard Pfister (PAB)	August Roth (SP/PS)	Alfons von Streng (Conservative)	Jakob Meili (PAB)	Otto Höppli (SP/PS)	Oskar Ullmann (FDP/PRD)
1931	Jakob Zingg (PAB)	Eduard Pfister (PAB)	6 seats 1931-present	Alfons von Streng (Conservative)	Jakob Meili (PAB)	Otto Höppli (SP/PS)	Oskar Ullmann (FDP/PRD)
1935	Carl Eder (Conservative)	August Roth (SP/PS)	6 seats 1931-present	Otto Wartmann (PAB)	Jakob Meili (PAB)	Otto Höppli (SP/PS)	Alfred Müller (FDP/PRD)
1939	Carl Eder (Conservative)	August Roth (SP/PS)	6 seats 1931-present	Otto Wartmann (PAB)	Jakob Meili (PAB)	Otto Höppli (SP/PS)	Alfred Müller (FDP/PRD)
1941	Carl Eder (Conservative)	Gottlieb Meier (SP/PS)	6 seats 1931-present	Otto Wartmann (PAB)	Jakob Meili (PAB)	Otto Höppli (SP/PS)	Alfred Müller (FDP/PRD)
1942	Carl Eder (Conservative)	Gottlieb Meier (SP/PS)	6 seats 1931-present	Otto Wartmann (PAB)	Otto (senior) Hess (PAB)	Otto Höppli (SP/PS)	Alfred Müller (FDP/PRD)
1943	Carl Eder (Conservative)	Rudolf Schümperli (SP/PS)	6 seats 1931-present	Otto Wartmann (PAB)	Otto (senior) Hess (PAB)	Otto Höppli (SP/PS)	Alfred Müller (FDP/PRD)
1947	Carl Eder (Conservative)	Rudolf Schümperli (SP/PS)	6 seats 1931-present	Otto Wartmann (PAB)	Otto (senior) Hess (PAB)	August Roth (SP/PS)	Alfred Müller (FDP/PRD)
1951	Carl Eder (Conservative)	Rudolf Schümperli (SP/PS)	6 seats 1931-present	Otto Wartmann (PAB)	Otto (senior) Hess (PAB)	Albert Bauer (SP/PS)	Walter Tuchschmid (FDP/PRD)
1954	Carl Eder (Conservative)	Ernst Rodel (SP/PS)	6 seats 1931-present	Otto Wartmann (PAB)	Otto (senior) Hess (PAB)	Albert Bauer (SP/PS)	Walter Tuchschmid (FDP/PRD)
1955	Carl Eder (Conservative)	Ernst Rodel (SP/PS)	6 seats 1931-present	Otto Wartmann (PAB)	Otto (senior) Hess (PAB)	Albert Bauer (SP/PS)	Walter Tuchschmid (FDP/PRD)
1959	Carl Eder (Conservative)	Ernst Rodel (SP/PS)	6 seats 1931-present	Hermann Graf (FDP/PRD)	Otto (senior) Hess (PAB)	Albert Bauer (SP/PS)	Albert Schläpfer (FDP/PRD)
1963	Hanspeter Fischer (BP*)	Alfred Abegg (SP/PS)	6 seats 1931-present	Josef Harder (CCS)	Otto (senior) Hess (PAB)	Albert Bauer (SP/PS)	Albert Schläpfer (FDP/PRD)
1964	Hanspeter Fischer (BP*)	Alfred Abegg (SP/PS)	6 seats 1931-present	Josef Harder (CCS)	Otto (senior) Hess (PAB)	Albert Bauer (SP/PS)	Otto Keller (FDP/PRD)
1967	Hanspeter Fischer (BP*)	Alfred Abegg (SP/PS)	6 seats 1931-present	Josef Harder (CCS)	Walter Ballmoos (PAB)	Albert Bauer (SP/PS)	Otto Keller (FDP/PRD)
1968	Hanspeter Fischer (BP*)	Alfred Abegg (SP/PS)	6 seats 1931-present	Alois Bommer (CCS)	Walter Ballmoos (PAB)	Albert Bauer (SP/PS)	Otto Keller (FDP/PRD)
1970	Hanspeter Fischer (BP*)	Alfred Abegg (SP/PS)	6 seats 1931-present	Alois Bommer (CCS)	Walter Ballmoos (PAB)	Rolf Weber (SP/PS)	Otto Keller (FDP/PRD)
1971	Hanspeter Fischer (BP*)	Paul Tanner (SVP/UDC)	6 seats 1931-present	Alois Bommer (CCS)	Wilfried Naegeli (N)	Rolf Weber (SP/PS)	Otto Keller (FDP/PRD)
1975	Hanspeter Fischer (BP*)	Franco Matossi (SVP/UDC)	6 seats 1931-present	Alois Bommer (CCS)	Hermann Wellauer (CVP/PDC)	Rolf Weber (SP/PS)	Otto Keller (FDP/PRD)
1979	Hanspeter Fischer (BP*)	Paul Rutishauser (SVP/UDC)	6 seats 1931-present	Hans Frei (CVP/PDC)	Hermann Wellauer (CVP/PDC)	Rolf Weber (SP/PS)	Willy Messmer (FDP/PRD)
1983	Ernst Mühlemann (FDP/PRD)	Paul Rutishauser (SVP/UDC)	6 seats 1931-present	Hans Frei (CVP/PDC)	Hermann Wellauer (CVP/PDC)	Rolf Weber (SP/PS)	Hans Uhlmann (SVP/UDC)
1986	Ernst Mühlemann (FDP/PRD)	Paul Rutishauser (SVP/UDC)	6 seats 1931-present	Margrit Camenzind (CVP/PDC)	Hermann Wellauer (CVP/PDC)	Rolf Weber (SP/PS)	Hans Uhlmann (SVP/UDC)
1987	Ernst Mühlemann (FDP/PRD)	Paul Rutishauser (SVP/UDC)	6 seats 1931-present	Peter Schmid (GPS/PES)	Hermann Wellauer (CVP/PDC)	Menga Danuser (SP/PS)	Otto Hess (SVP/UDC)
1991	Ernst Mühlemann (FDP/PRD)	Paul Rutishauser (SVP/UDC)	6 seats 1931-present	Peter Schmid (GPS/PES)	Hansueli Raggenbass (CVP/PDC)	Menga Danuser (SP/PS)	Otto Hess (SVP/UDC)
1995	Ernst Mühlemann (FDP/PRD)	J. Alexander Baumann (SVP/UDC)	6 seats 1931-present	Wilfried Ernest Gusset (0)	Hansueli Raggenbass (CVP/PDC)	Jost Gross (SP/PS)	Otto Hess (SVP/UDC)
1999	Werner Messmer (FDP/PRD / FDP.The Liberals)	J. Alexander Baumann (SVP/UDC)	6 seats 1931-present	Peter Spuhler (SVP/UDC)	Hansueli Raggenbass (CVP/PDC)	Jost Gross (SP/PS)	Hansjörg Walter (SVP/UDC)
2003	Werner Messmer (FDP/PRD / FDP.The Liberals)	J. Alexander Baumann (SVP/UDC)	6 seats 1931-present	Peter Spuhler (SVP/UDC)	Brigitte Häberli-Koller (CVP/PDC)	Jost Gross (SP/PS)	Hansjörg Walter (SVP/UDC)
2005	Werner Messmer (FDP/PRD / FDP.The Liberals)	J. Alexander Baumann (SVP/UDC)	6 seats 1931-present	Peter Spuhler (SVP/UDC)	Brigitte Häberli-Koller (CVP/PDC)	Edith Graf-Litscher (SP/PS)	Hansjörg Walter (SVP/UDC)
2007	Werner Messmer (FDP/PRD / FDP.The Liberals)	J. Alexander Baumann (SVP/UDC)	6 seats 1931-present	Peter Spuhler (SVP/UDC)	Brigitte Häberli-Koller (CVP/PDC)	Edith Graf-Litscher (SP/PS)	Hansjörg Walter (SVP/UDC)
2009	Werner Messmer (FDP/PRD / FDP.The Liberals)	J. Alexander Baumann (SVP/UDC)	6 seats 1931-present	Peter Spuhler (SVP/UDC)	Brigitte Häberli-Koller (CVP/PDC)	Edith Graf-Litscher (SP/PS)	Hansjörg Walter (SVP/UDC)
2011	Thomas Böhni (GLP/PVL)	Markus Hausammann (SVP/UDC)	6 seats 1931-present	Peter Spuhler (SVP/UDC)	Christian Lohr (CVP/PDC/ The Centre)	Edith Graf-Litscher (SP/PS)	Hansjörg Walter (SVP/UDC)
2013	Thomas Böhni (GLP/PVL)	Markus Hausammann (SVP/UDC)	6 seats 1931-present	Verena Herzog (SVP/UDC)	Christian Lohr (CVP/PDC/ The Centre)	Edith Graf-Litscher (SP/PS)	Hansjörg Walter (SVP/UDC)
2015	Hermann Hess (FDP/PLR)	Markus Hausammann (SVP/UDC)	6 seats 1931-present	Verena Herzog (SVP/UDC)	Christian Lohr (CVP/PDC/ The Centre)	Edith Graf-Litscher (SP/PS)	
2017	Hansjörg Brunner (FDP/PLR)	Markus Hausammann (SVP/UDC)	6 seats 1931-present	Verena Herzog (SVP/UDC)	Christian Lohr (CVP/PDC/ The Centre)	Edith Graf-Litscher (SP/PS)	Diana Gutjahr (SVP/UDC)
2019	Kurt Egger (GP/PV)	Manuel Strupler (SVP/UDC)	6 seats 1931-present	Verena Herzog (SVP/UDC)	Christian Lohr (CVP/PDC/ The Centre)	Edith Graf-Litscher (SP/PS)	Diana Gutjahr (SVP/UDC)
2023	Kristiane Vietze (FDP.The Liberals)	Manuel Strupler (SVP/UDC)	6 seats 1931-present	Pascal Schmid (SVP/UDC)	Christian Lohr (CVP/PDC/ The Centre)	Nina Schläfli (SP/PS)	Diana Gutjahr (SVP/UDC)
