= Geissbühler =

Geissbühler is a surname. Notable people with the surname include:

- Andrea Geissbühler (born 1976), Swiss teacher and politician
- Luke Geissbühler, American cinematographer and producer
- Steff Geissbühler (born 1942), Swiss graphic designer
