= List of members of the Federal Assembly from the Canton of Jura =

Coat of Arms

This is a list of members of both houses of the Federal Assembly from the Canton of Jura. Until 1979, the area of Jura was part of the Canton of Bern and was represented as such.

== Members of the Council of States ==
Councillor (Party)	Election	Councillor (Party)
Roger Schaffter; Christian Democratic People's Party; 1979–1987	1979	Pierre Gassmann; Social Democratic Party; 1979–1983
Roger Schaffter; Christian Democratic People's Party; 1979–1987	1983	Gaston Brahier; Free Democratic Party; 1983–1986
Roger Schaffter; Christian Democratic People's Party; 1979–1987	1986	Michel Flückiger; Free Democratic Party; 1986–1995
Jean-François Roth; Christian Democratic People's Party; 1987–1995	1987	Michel Flückiger; Free Democratic Party; 1986–1995
Jean-François Roth; Christian Democratic People's Party; 1987–1995	1991	Michel Flückiger; Free Democratic Party; 1986–1995
Marie-Madeleine Prongué; Christian Democratic People's Party; 1995	1995	Nicolas Carnat; Free Democratic Party; 1995
Pierre Paupe; Christian Democratic People's Party; 1995–2003	1995	Pierre-Alain Gentil; Social Democratic Party; 1995–2003
Pierre Paupe; Christian Democratic People's Party; 1995–2003	1999	Pierre-Alain Gentil; Social Democratic Party; 1995–2003
Madeleine Amgwerd; Christian Democratic People's Party; 2003–2007	2003	Pierre-Alain Gentil; Social Democratic Party; 1995–2003
Anne Seydoux-Christe; Christian Democratic People's Party; 2007–2019	2007	Claude Hêche; Social Democratic Party; 2007–2019
Anne Seydoux-Christe; Christian Democratic People's Party; 2007–2019	2011	Claude Hêche; Social Democratic Party; 2007–2019
Anne Seydoux-Christe; Christian Democratic People's Party; 2007–2019	2015	Claude Hêche; Social Democratic Party; 2007–2019
Charles Juillard; Christian Democratic People's Party; 2019–2023; The Centre; 2023–present	2019	Élisabeth Baume-Schneider; Social Democratic Party; 2019–2023
Charles Juillard; Christian Democratic People's Party; 2019–2023; The Centre; 2023–present	2023	Mathilde Crevoisier Crelier; Social Democratic Party; 2019–present

== Members of the National Council ==
Election	Councillor (Party)	Councillor (Party)
1979	Gabriel Roy (Ind. CSP/PCS)	Jean Wilhelm (CVP/PDC)
1983	Pierre Etique (FDP/PRD)	Valentine Friedli (SP/PS)
1987	Pierre Etique (FDP/PRD)	Gabriel Theubet (CVP/PDC)
1991	Pierre Etique (FDP/PRD)	Gabriel Theubet (CVP/PDC)
1993	Alain Schweingruber (FDP/PRD)	Gabriel Theubet (CVP/PDC)
1995	Jean-Claude Rennwald (SP/PS)	François Lachat (CVP/PDC)
1999	Jean-Claude Rennwald (SP/PS)	François Lachat (CVP/PDC)
2003	Jean-Claude Rennwald (SP/PS)	Pierre Kohler (CVP/PDC)
2007	Jean-Claude Rennwald (SP/PS)	Dominique Baettig (SVP/UDC)
2011	Pierre-Alain Fridez (SP/PS)	Jean-Paul Gschwind (CVP/PDC)
2015	Pierre-Alain Fridez (SP/PS)	Jean-Paul Gschwind (CVP/PDC)
2019	Pierre-Alain Fridez (SP/PS)	Jean-Paul Gschwind (CVP/PDC)
2023	Pierre-Alain Fridez (SP/PS)	Thomas Stettler (SVP/UDC)
