= List of members of the Federal Assembly from the Canton of Glarus =

Coat of Arms

This is a list of members of both houses of the Federal Assembly from the Canton of Glarus.

== Members of the Council of States ==
Councillor (Party)	Election	Councillor (Party)
Johann Jakob Blumer; Liberal Party; 1848–1872	Appointed	Heinrich Trümpy; Liberal Party; 1848–1849
Johann Jakob Blumer; Liberal Party; 1848–1872	Appointed	Joseph Weber; Liberal Party; 1849–1884
Niklaus Tschudi; Liberal Party; 1872–1872	Appointed	Joseph Weber; Liberal Party; 1849–1884
Johann Jakob Blumer; Liberal Party; 1873–1874	Appointed	Joseph Weber; Liberal Party; 1849–1884
Peter jun. Jenny; Swiss Democrats; 1875–1877	Appointed	Joseph Weber; Liberal Party; 1849–1884
Eduard Blumer; Swiss Democrats; 1877–1888	Appointed	Joseph Weber; Liberal Party; 1849–1884
Eduard Blumer; Swiss Democrats; 1877–1888	Appointed	Esaja Zweifel; Liberal Party; 1884–1893
Charles Philippe Mercier; Liberal Party; 1888–1889	Appointed	Esaja Zweifel; Liberal Party; 1884–1893
Peter Zweifel; Swiss Democrats; 1890–1907	Appointed	
Peter Zweifel; Swiss Democrats; 1890–1907	Appointed	Leonhard Blumer; Swiss Democrats; 1893–1905
Peter Zweifel; Swiss Democrats; 1890–1907	Appointed	Gottfried Heer; Swiss Democrats; 1906–1914
Philippe Mercier; Free Democratic Party; 1907–1936	Appointed	Gottfried Heer; Swiss Democrats; 1906–1914
Philippe Mercier; Free Democratic Party; 1907–1936	Appointed	David Legler; Swiss Democrats; 1914–1920
Philippe Mercier; Free Democratic Party; 1907–1936	Appointed	Edwin Hauser; Swiss Democrats; 1921–1938
Joachim Mercier; Free Democratic Party; 1936–1946	Appointed	Edwin Hauser; Swiss Democrats; 1921–1938
Joachim Mercier; Free Democratic Party; 1936–1946	Appointed	Melchior Hefti; Swiss Democrats; 1938–1953
Rudolf Stüssi; Free Democratic Party; 1946–1962	Appointed	Melchior Hefti; Swiss Democrats; 1938–1953
Rudolf Stüssi; Free Democratic Party; 1946–1962	Appointed	Heinrich Heer; Swiss Democrats; 1953–1968
Fridolin Stucki; Swiss Democrats; 1962–1978	Appointed	Heinrich Heer; Swiss Democrats; 1953–1968
Fridolin Stucki; Swiss Democrats; 1962–1978	Appointed	Peter Hefti; Free Democratic Party; 1968–1990
Fridolin Stucki; Swiss Democrats; 1962–1978	1971	Peter Hefti; Free Democratic Party; 1968–1990
Fridolin Stucki; Swiss Democrats; 1962–1978	1975	Peter Hefti; Free Democratic Party; 1968–1990
Hans Meier; Christian Democratic People's Party; 1978–1990	1978	Peter Hefti; Free Democratic Party; 1968–1990
Hans Meier; Christian Democratic People's Party; 1978–1990	1979	Peter Hefti; Free Democratic Party; 1968–1990
Hans Meier; Christian Democratic People's Party; 1978–1990	1983	Peter Hefti; Free Democratic Party; 1968–1990
Hans Meier; Christian Democratic People's Party; 1978–1990	1987	Peter Hefti; Free Democratic Party; 1968–1990
Kaspar Rhyner; Free Democratic Party; 1990–1998	1990	Fritz Schiesser; Free Democratic Party; 1990–2007
Kaspar Rhyner; Free Democratic Party; 1990–1998	1991	Fritz Schiesser; Free Democratic Party; 1990–2007
Kaspar Rhyner; Free Democratic Party; 1990–1998	1995	Fritz Schiesser; Free Democratic Party; 1990–2007
This Jenny; Swiss People's Party; 1998–2014	1998	Fritz Schiesser; Free Democratic Party; 1990–2007
This Jenny; Swiss People's Party; 1998–2014	1999	Fritz Schiesser; Free Democratic Party; 1990–2007
This Jenny; Swiss People's Party; 1998–2014	2003	Fritz Schiesser; Free Democratic Party; 1990–2007
This Jenny; Swiss People's Party; 1998–2014	2007	Fritz Schiesser; Free Democratic Party; 1990–2007
This Jenny; Swiss People's Party; 1998–2014	2008	Pankraz Freitag; Free Democratic Party; 2008–2009; FDP.The Liberals; 2009–2013
This Jenny; Swiss People's Party; 1998–2014	2009	Pankraz Freitag; Free Democratic Party; 2008–2009; FDP.The Liberals; 2009–2013
This Jenny; Swiss People's Party; 1998–2014	2011	Pankraz Freitag; Free Democratic Party; 2008–2009; FDP.The Liberals; 2009–2013
Werner Hösli; Swiss People's Party; 2014–2019	2014	Thomas Hefti; FDP.The Liberals; 2014–2023
Werner Hösli; Swiss People's Party; 2014–2019	2015	Thomas Hefti; FDP.The Liberals; 2014–2023
Mathias Zopfi; Green Party of Switzerland; 2019–present	2019	Thomas Hefti; FDP.The Liberals; 2014–2023
Mathias Zopfi; Green Party of Switzerland; 2019–present	2023	Benjamin Mühlemann; FDP.The Liberals; 2023–present

== Members of the National Council ==
Election	Councillor (Party)	Councillor (Party)	Councillor (Party)
1848	Kaspar Jenny (FDP/PRD)	1 seat 1848–1884	
1851	Johannes Trümpy (FDP/PRD)	1 seat 1848–1884	
1854	Johannes Trümpy (FDP/PRD)	1 seat 1848–1884	
1857	Joachim Heer (Liberal)	1 seat 1848–1884	
1858	Peter sen. Jenny (Liberal)	1 seat 1848–1884	
1860	Peter sen. Jenny (Liberal)	1 seat 1848–1884	
1863	Peter sen. Jenny (Liberal)	1 seat 1848–1884	
1866	Peter jun. Jenny (SD/DS)	1 seat 1848–1884	
1869	Peter jun. Jenny (SD/DS)	1 seat 1848–1884	
1872	Niklaus Tschudi (Liberal)	1 seat 1848–1884	
1875	Niklaus Tschudi (Liberal)	1 seat 1848–1884	
1876	Esaja Zweifel (Liberal)	1 seat 1848–1884	
1878	Esaja Zweifel (Liberal)	1 seat 1848–1884	
1881	Esaja Zweifel (Liberal)	1 seat 1848–1884	
1884	Charles Philippe Mercier (Liberal)	Kaspar Schindler (SD/DS)	2 seats 1884–1890
1887	Rudolf Gallati (FDP/PRD)	Kaspar Schindler (SD/DS)	2 seats 1884–1890
1890	Rudolf Gallati (FDP/PRD)	Kaspar Schindler (SD/DS)	Peter Zweifel (SD/DS)
1893	Rudolf Gallati (FDP/PRD)	Kaspar Schindler (SD/DS)	Peter Zweifel (SD/DS)
1896	Rudolf Gallati (FDP/PRD)	Kaspar Schindler (SD/DS)	Peter Zweifel (SD/DS)
1899	Rudolf Gallati (FDP/PRD)	2 seats 1899–1907	Peter Zweifel (SD/DS)
1902	Rudolf Gallati (FDP/PRD)	2 seats 1899–1907	Peter Zweifel (SD/DS)
1904	David Legler (SD/DS)	2 seats 1899–1907	Peter Zweifel (SD/DS)
1905	David Legler (SD/DS)	2 seats 1899–1907	Peter Zweifel (SD/DS)
1908	David Legler (SD/DS)	1 seat 1908–1925	
1911	David Legler (SD/DS)	1 seat 1908–1925	
1914	Heinrich Jenny (FDP/PRD)	1 seat 1908–1925	
1917	Heinrich Jenny (FDP/PRD)	1 seat 1908–1925	
1919	Heinrich Jenny (FDP/PRD)	1 seat 1908–1925	
1922	Heinrich Jenny (FDP/PRD)	1 seat 1908–1925	
1925	Heinrich Jenny (FDP/PRD)	Rudolf Tschudy (SD/DS)	2 seats 1925–1971
1928	Heinrich Jenny (FDP/PRD)	Rudolf Tschudy (SD/DS)	2 seats 1925–1971
1931	Heinrich Jenny (FDP/PRD)	Rudolf Tschudy (SD/DS)	2 seats 1925–1971
1935	Rudolf Gallati (FDP/PRD)	Rudolf Tschudy (SD/DS)	2 seats 1925–1971
1937	Rudolf Gallati (FDP/PRD)	Hans Trümpy (FDP/PRD)	2 seats 1925–1971
1939	Rudolf Gallati (FDP/PRD)	Hans Trümpy (FDP/PRD)	2 seats 1925–1971
1943	Christian Meier (SP/PS)	Ludwig Zweifel (FDP/PRD)	2 seats 1925–1971
1946	Christian Meier (SP/PS)	Hans Schuler (FDP/PRD)	2 seats 1925–1971
1947	Christian Meier (SP/PS)	Hans Schuler (FDP/PRD)	2 seats 1925–1971
1951	Christian Meier (SP/PS)	Hans Schuler (FDP/PRD)	2 seats 1925–1971
1955	Christian Meier (SP/PS)	Hans Schuler (FDP/PRD)	2 seats 1925–1971
1959	Franz Landolt (SP/PS)	Jacques Glarner (FDP/PRD)	2 seats 1925–1971
1963	Franz Landolt (SP/PS)	Jacques Glarner (FDP/PRD)	2 seats 1925–1971
1965	David Baumgartner (SP/PS)	Jacques Glarner (FDP/PRD)	2 seats 1925–1971
1967	David Baumgartner (SP/PS)	Jacques Glarner (FDP/PRD)	2 seats 1925–1971
1970	David Baumgartner (SP/PS)	Alfred Heer (FDP/PRD)	2 seats 1925–1971
1971	David Baumgartner (SP/PS)	1 seat 1971-present	
1975	David Baumgartner (SP/PS)	1 seat 1971-present	
1978	Fritz Hösli (SVP/UDC)	1 seat 1971-present	
1979	Fritz Hösli (SVP/UDC)	1 seat 1971-present	
1983	Fritz Hösli (SVP/UDC)	1 seat 1971-present	
1987	Fritz Hösli (SVP/UDC)	1 seat 1971-present	
1991	Werner Marti (SP/PS)	1 seat 1971-present	
1995	Werner Marti (SP/PS)	1 seat 1971-present	
1999	Werner Marti (SP/PS)	1 seat 1971-present	
2003	Werner Marti (SP/PS)	1 seat 1971-present	
2007	Werner Marti (SP/PS)	1 seat 1971-present	
2009	Martin Landolt (BDP/PBD)	1 seat 1971-present	
2011	Martin Landolt (BDP/PBD)	1 seat 1971-present	
2015	Martin Landolt (BDP/PBD)	1 seat 1971-present	
2019	Martin Landolt (BDP/PBD)	1 seat 1971-present	
2023	Markus Schnyder (SVP/UDC)	1 seat 1971-present	
