= Jakob Stark =

Swiss journalist, editor and politician

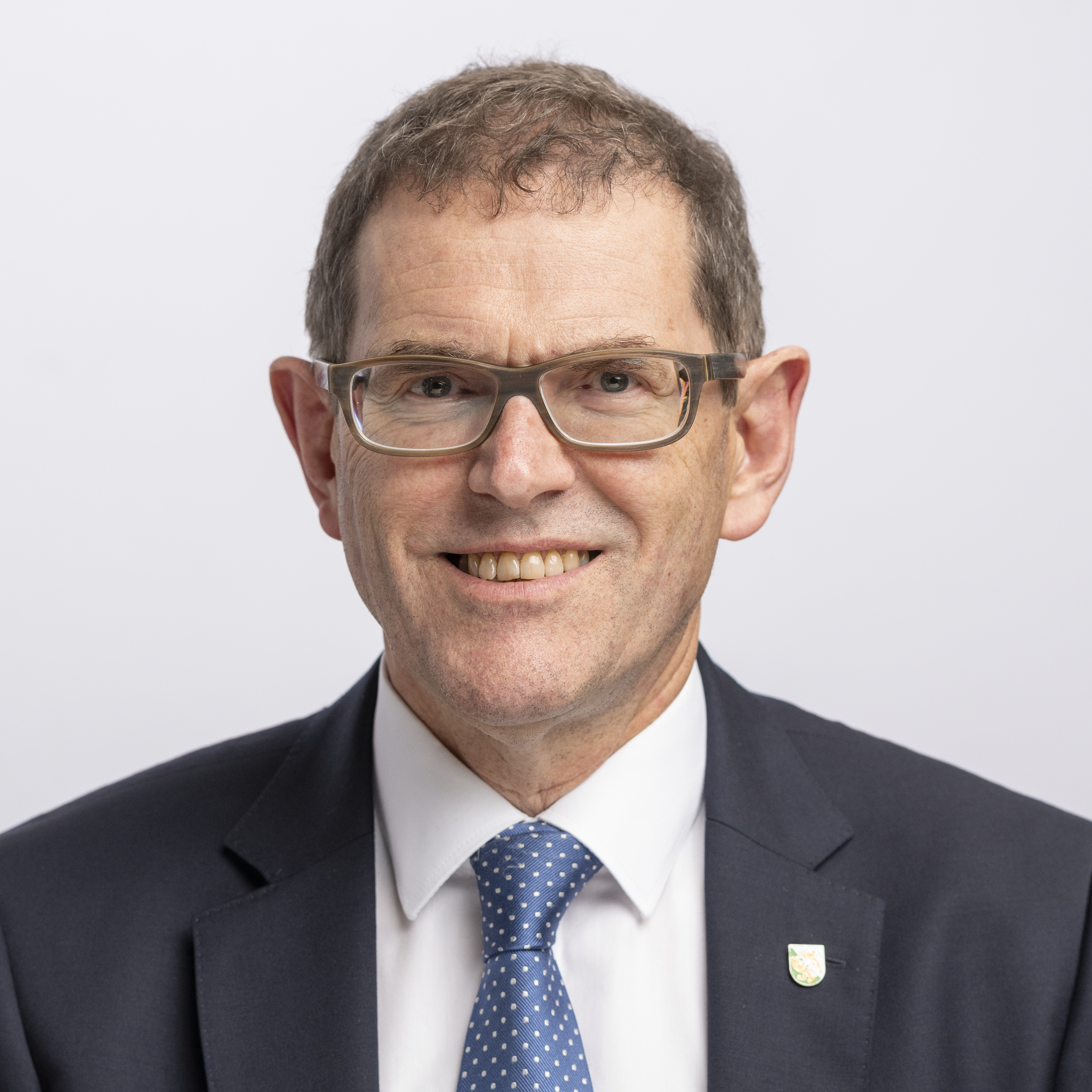
- Official portrait, 2023

Member of the Council of States
- Incumbent
- Assumed office 2 December 2019
- Constituency: Canton of Thurgau

Member of the Executive Council of Thurgau
- In office 1 June 2006 – 30 May 2020

Personal details
- Born: Jakob Stark; 8 September 1958 (age 67) Frauenfeld, Switzerland
- Spouse: Cornelia Bartholdi
- Children: 2

Jakob Stark (born 8 September 1958) is a Swiss journalist, editor and politician who currently serves on the Council of States for the Swiss People's Party since 2019. He previously served on the Executive Council of Thurgau from 2006 to 2020.
