= Liberalism in Switzerland =

Overview of liberalism and radicalism in Switzerland

This article gives an overview of liberalism and the historical radicalism movement within liberalism in Switzerland. It is limited to liberal and radical parties with substantial support, mainly proved by having had a representation in parliament. The sign ⇒ means a reference to another party in that scheme. For inclusion in this scheme it is not necessary that parties labeled themselves as a liberal party.

== Introduction ==
In the nineteenth century the radicalism of Freisinn became the dominant political force in Switzerland, which remained for a long time in the twentieth century. Both the major Free Democratic Party of Switzerland (Freisinnig-Demokratische Partei der Schweiz/Parti Radical-Démocratique Suisse, member LI, ALDE Party) and the minor Liberal Party of Switzerland (Liberale Partei der Schweiz/Parti Libéral Suisse, member LI) were centre-right liberal parties that merged into FDP.The Liberals (FDP.Die Liberalen/PLR.Les Libéraux-Radicaux, observer LI, member ALDE) in 2009.

== Timeline ==
=== From Liberal Democrats to Liberal Party of Switzerland ===
- 1893: The moderate liberals established the Liberal Democrats (Liberaldemokraten), but most German-speaking liberals joined in 1894 the ⇒ Free Democratic Party of Switzerland
- 1913: The party is renamed Liberal Democratic Party (Liberaldemokratische Partei)
- 1961: The party is reorganised into the Liberal Democratic Union of Switzerland (Liberaldemokratische Union der Schweiz)
- 1977: The party is renamed Liberal Party of Switzerland (Liberale Partei der Schweiz/Parti Libéral Suisse)

=== Free Democratic Party of Switzerland ===
- 1894: The Radicals (Freisinn in German) became a dominant factor in Swiss politics and established as a party the Free Democratic Party of Switzerland (Freisinnig-Demokratische Partei der Schweiz/Parti Radical-Démocratique Suisse)
- 1896: A faction formed the ⇒ Extreme Left
- 1918: A conservative faction of the party seceded as the Party of Farmers, Traders and Independents
- 1941: The Zürich branch joined the ⇒ Democratic Party of Switzerland
- 1971: The Zürich branch of the ⇒ Democratic Party of Switzerland rejoined the party

=== From Extreme Left to Democratic Party of Switzerland ===
- 1896: The left wing of the ⇒ Free Democratic Party of Switzerland established the Extreme Left (Äußerste Linke)
- 1905: The Extreme Left organised itself as the social liberal Democratic Party of Switzerland (Demokratische Partei der Schweiz)
- 1941: A Zürich faction of the ⇒ Free Democratic Party of Switzerland joined the party
- 1971: The Zürich branch of the party returned to the ⇒ Free Democratic Party of Switzerland, while the Glarus and Grisons branches merged into the Swiss People's Party

=== Ring of Independents ===
- 1936: Gottlieb Duttweiler formed the Ring of Independents as a social-liberal party
- 1999: The party disbanded

== Liberal leaders ==
- Freisinn: Ludwig Snell - Alfred Escher

== See also ==
- History of Switzerland
- Politics of Switzerland
- List of political parties in Switzerland
