= Jean-Pierre Grin-Hofmann =

Swiss politician

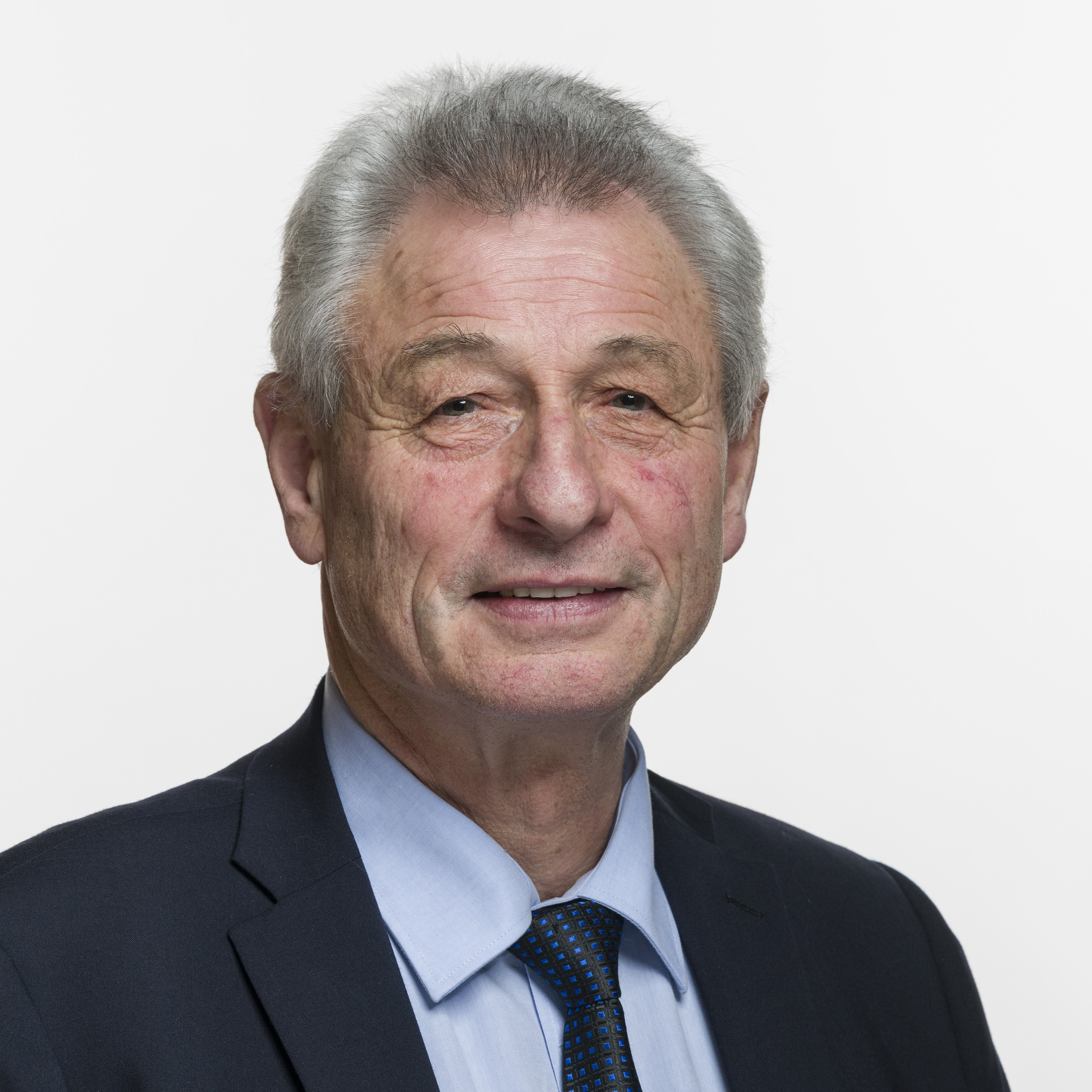
- Official portrait, 2019

Member of the National Council (Switzerland)
- Incumbent
- Assumed office 3 December 2007
- Constituency: Canton of Vaud

Personal details
- Born: Jean-Pierre Grin; 16 March 1947 (age 79) Valeyres-sous-Rances, Vaud, Switzerland
- Spouse: Evelyne Hofmann
- Children: 4

Jean-Pierre Grin stylized as Jean-Pierre Grin-Hofmann (French pronunciation: [ɡʁɛːn]; born 16 March 1947) is a Swiss farmer and politician. He served as a member of the National Council (Switzerland) for the Swiss People's Party from 2007 until 2023. Grin was a member of the Parliamentary Assembly of the Council of Europe. He previously served as a member of the Cantonal Council of Vaud from 1998 to 2007.

== Responsibility for accident ==
In July 2012, Grin was involved in a deadly accident with his tractor. In June 2014, he was convicted of negligent homicide on 'average guilt' and sentenced to conditional sentence of 30 daily payments and a penalty of 1,000 Swiss Francs.

== Politics ==
Between 1967 and 1973, Grin served on the legislative of Pomy, in the municipal council and since 1974 in the executive office. Between 1994 and 2011 he was the mayor of Pomy. Between 1998 and 2007, Grin served as a member of the Cantonal Council of Vaud for the Swiss People's Party, where he was the president of his party. Since 2007, he serves as a member of the National Council (Switzerland).

== Personal life ==
Grin is married to Evelyne (née Hofmann) and resides in Pomy, Switzerland. He has one son (born 1971) and two daughters (born 1983 and 1984). His second eldest son (born 1974) died in a tragic accident with an agricultural machine.
