= Suzette Sandoz =

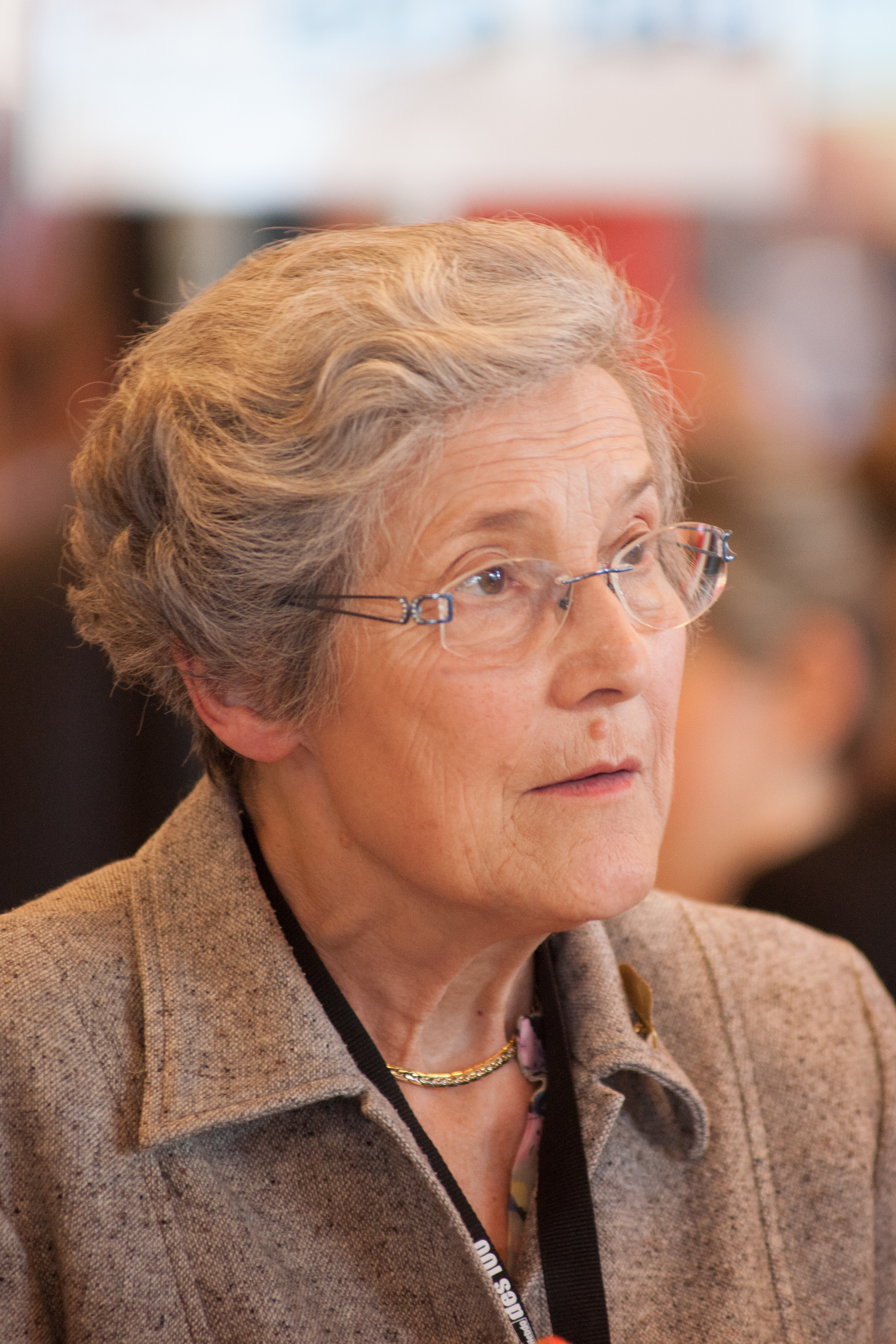

Swiss National Council

Personal details
- Born: 12 January 1942 (age 84) Lausanne, Switzerland
- Party: Liberal Party of Switzerland
- Education: University of Lausanne

Suzette Sandoz, born Suzette Monod in Lausanne on 12 January 1942, is a professor of law and a Swiss political figure and member of the Liberal Party of Switzerland.

== Personal life ==
She studied at the University of Lausanne and got a PhD in law in 1974. Honorary Professor of Family and Succession Law at the University of Lausanne, she was Dean of the Faculty of Law from 2000 to 2002. She was elected to the Grand Council of the canton of Vaud from 1986 to 1991 and then, from 1991 to November 1998, to the Swiss National Council.

== Positions ==
On 26 March 2015, she declared on the Radio Télévision Suisse: “Gay marriage could lead to the end of our civilization.”

In December 2018 she raged on the Radio Télévision Suisse against the opening of a vegetarian buffet in Lausanne. "They want to force a category of ethical-crazy (“éthico-follo”) approaches upon people and that's a way of denying free choice."

== Covering of Italian works of art during the visit of a high Iranian dignitary ==
In January 2016, in her blog, she denounces the betrayal of European culture as well as the denial of works of art which occurred during the visit of a high Iranian dignitary.
