= Solidarity (Switzerland) =

Political party in Switzerland

Solidarity solidaritéS
- Founded: 1992
- Headquarters: 1211 Geneva
- Ideology: Socialism; Anti-capitalism
- Political position: Left-wing to far-left
- European affiliation: European Anti-Capitalist Left (dissolved in 2013)
- International affiliation: Fourth International
- National Council: 0 / 200
- Council of States: 0 / 46
- Cantonal legislatures: 5 / 2,608

Website
- solidarites.ch

Solidarity (French: solidaritéS) is a socialist and Trotskyist political party, present in the French-speaking part of Switzerland, in the cantons of Geneva, Vaud, Neuchâtel and Fribourg. It was the furthest left party represented in the National Council until losing their only seat in 2023.

== History ==
The party was founded in 1992 in Geneva. In the 1995 federal elections, it received 0.3% of the vote, failing to win a seat. Its vote share increased to 0.5% in the 1999 elections, and a party member running on a list named "Alliance of the Left (Solidarity–Independents)" won a seat in the National Council. The party retained its seat in the 2003 elections, but lost parliamentary representation following the 2007 elections, in which its vote share fell to 0.4%.

The 2011 elections saw the vote share reduced to 0.3%; although its vote share increased to 0.5% in the 2015 elections, the party remained seatless. Running with the Swiss Party of Labour in the 2019 elections, the party once again won a seat in the National Council, with the electoral alliance receiving a vote share of 1.0%.
