= Andrea Geissbühler =

Swiss politician (born 1976)

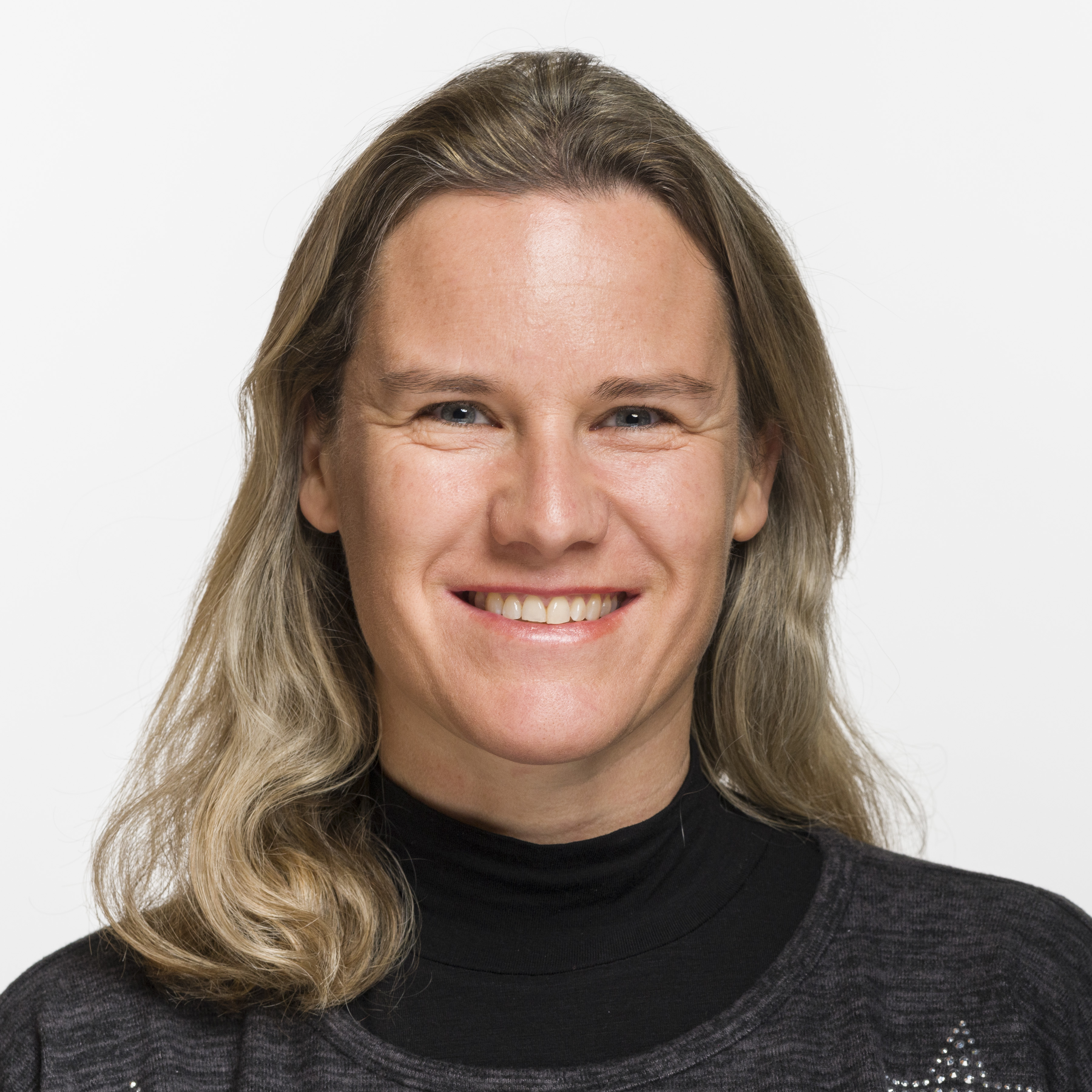
- Official portrait, 2019

Member of the National Council (Switzerland)
- In office 3 December 2007 – 3 December 2023
- Constituency: Canton of Bern

Personal details
- Born: Andrea Martina Geissbühler; 3 August 1976 (age 49) Bern, Switzerland
- Party: Swiss People's Party
- Children: 3
- Occupation: Politician, formerly police officer, teacher
- Website: Official website (in German)

Andrea Martina Geissbühler (born 3 August 1976) is a Swiss teacher and politician who most notably served on the National Council (Switzerland) for the Swiss People's Party between 2007 and 2023. Due to a current term limit of 16 years she was excluded from the 2023 Swiss federal election Following this the Swiss People's Party nominated her mother, Sabina Geissbühler, who previously served on the Grand Council of Bern, to take her position. However she was not elected.
