= Peter Keller (politician) =

Swiss politician (born 1971)

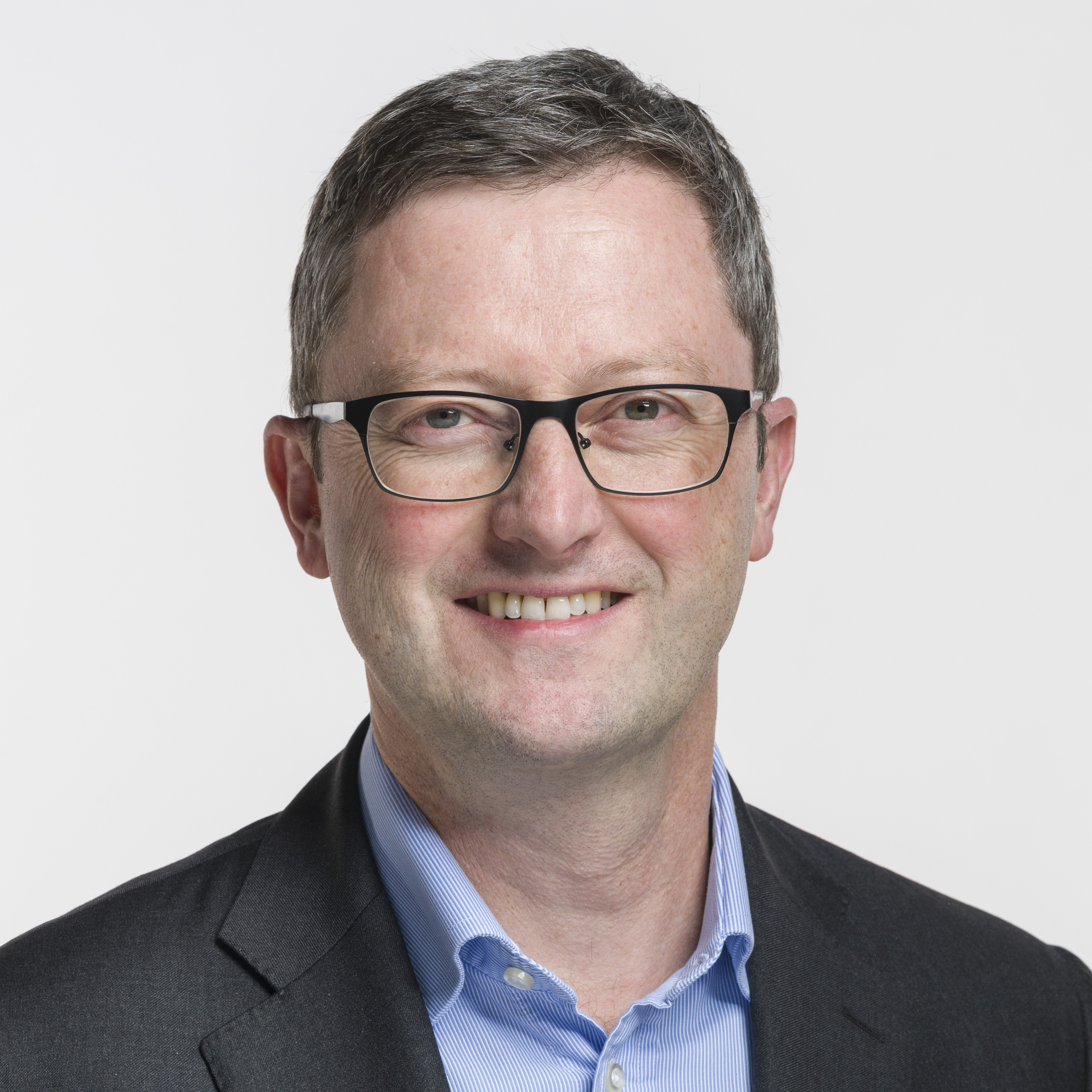
- Official portrait, 2019

Member of National Council (Switzerland)
- In office 5 December 2011 – 3 December 2023

Personal details
- Born: Peter Keller; April 22, 1971 (age 55) Lucerne, Switzerland
- Education: University of Zürich (Licentiate)
- Occupation: Journalist, politician
- Website: Official website

Peter Keller (born April 22, 1971) is a Swiss journalist and former politician who served on the National Council (Switzerland) from 2011 to 2023.

== Career ==
Keller has been a member of the National Council for the Swiss People's Party between 2011 and 2023. He currently works as an independent editor of Die Weltwoche.
