= Erich von Siebenthal =

Swiss politician (born 1958)

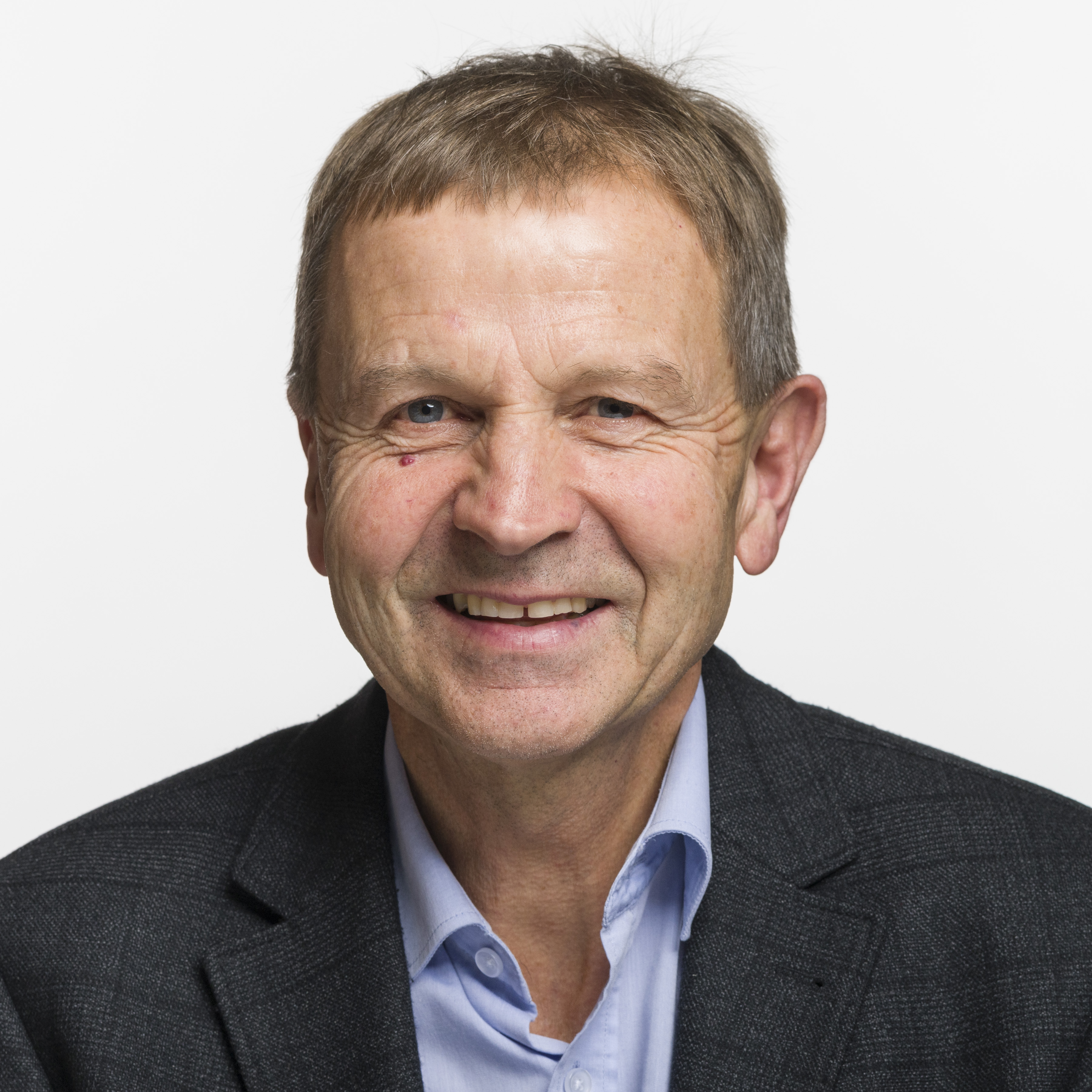
- Official portrait, 2019

Member of the National Council (Switzerland)
- Incumbent
- Assumed office 3 December 2007

Member of the Grand Council of Bern
- In office 2002–2007

Personal details
- Born: Erich von Siebenthal; 30 December 1958 (age 67) Gstaad, Switzerland
- Party: Swiss People's Party
- Spouse: Maria Glauser
- Children: 3
- Occupation: Farmer, politician
- Website: Official website (in German)

Erich von Siebenthal (born 30 December 1958) is a Swiss farmer and politician. He serves as a member of the National Council (Switzerland) since 2007 for the Swiss People's Party. He previously served on the Grand Council of Bern between 2002 and 2007. Von Siebenthal belongs to the United Methodist Church.
