= Olivier Français =

Swiss politician

- Constituency: Vaud

Member of the Council of States of Switzerland
- Incumbent
- Assumed office 11 November 2015

Member of the National Council of Switzerland
- In office 3 December 2007 – 29 November 2015

Personal details
- Born: 10 January 1955 (age 71) Metz, France
- Party: The Liberals

Olivier Français is a Swiss politician who is a member of the Council of States of Switzerland.

== Biography ==
Français was born into a French family in Metz, France to a mother from Grenoble and a father from Alsace-Lorraine. Due to his fathers work, he travelled to Geneva often in childhood. He moved to Lausanne and became a Swiss citizen in 1988 to participate in politics. He was elected to the National Council in 2007 and 2015, and elected to the Council of States in 2019.
