= 1999 Swiss federal election =

← 1995	24 October 1999	2003 →
- All 200 seats in the National Council (101 seats needed for a majority); All 46 seats in the Council of States (24 seats needed for a majority)
- Turnout: 43.3% ▲1.1 pp
Party	Leader	Vote %	Seats	+/–
National Council
Swiss People's	Ueli Maurer	22.6%	44	+15
Social Democrats	Ursula Koch	22.5%	51	−3
Free Democrats	Franz Steinegger	19.9%	43	−2
Christian Democrats	Adalbert Durrer	15.8%	35	+1
Greens	Ruedi Baumann	5.0%	8	0
Liberals	Jacques-Simon Eggly	2.2%	6	−1
Swiss Democrats	Rudolf Keller	1.8%	1	−2
Evangelical People's	Otto Zwygart	1.8%	3	+1
Federal Democrats	Christian Waber	1.2%	1	0
Labour		1.0%	2	−1
Ticino League	Giuliano Bignasca	0.9%	2	+1
LdU	Anton Schaller	0.7%	1	−2
solidaritéS		0.5%	1	+1
Christian Social		0.4%	1	0
Feminist & Greens		0.3%	1	−1
Council of States
Free Democrats			17	0
Christian Democrats			15	−1
Swiss People's			7	+2
Social Democrats			6	+1
Independent			1	+1
This lists parties that won seats. See the complete results below.
Map of Swiss cantons colored by the party that won the most votes. The seats that were won in the cantons for both the National Council and the Council of States are shown as well. The independent elected to the Council of States from Obwalden sat with the FDP.

Federal elections were held in Switzerland on 24 October 1999. Although the Swiss People's Party received the most votes for the first time in the party's history, the Social Democratic Party remained the largest party in the National Council, winning 51 of the 200 seats.

== Results ==
=== National Council ===
Party	Votes	%	Seats	+/–
Swiss People's Party	440,159	22.56	44	+15
Social Democratic Party	438,560	22.48	51	–3
Free Democratic Party	388,780	19.93	43	–2
Christian Democratic People's Party	309,118	15.84	35	+1
Green Party	96,807	4.96	8	0
Liberal Party	43,870	2.25	6	–1
Swiss Democrats	35,883	1.84	1	–2
Evangelical People's Party	35,679	1.83	3	+1
Federal Democratic Union	24,355	1.25	1	0
Swiss Party of Labour	18,569	0.95	2	–1
Ticino League	17,118	0.88	2	+1
Freedom Party	16,887	0.87	0	–7
Alliance of Independents	14,439	0.74	1	–2
Solidarity	9,138	0.47	1	+1
Christian Social Party	8,212	0.42	1	0
Feminist and Green Alternative Groups	6,257	0.32	1	–1
Other parties	47,120	2.42	0	–
Total	1,950,951	100.00	200	0
Valid votes	1,950,951	97.33		
Invalid/blank votes	53,457	2.67		
Total votes	2,004,408	100.00		
Registered voters/turnout	4,628,782	43.30		
Source: Nohlen & Stöver

==== By constituency ====
Constituency	Seats	Electorate	Turnout	Party	Votes	Seats won
Aargau	15	351,130	147,630	Swiss People's Party	684,136	5
Aargau	15	351,130	147,630	Social Democratic Party	403,663	3
Aargau	15	351,130	147,630	Free Democratic Party	369,994	3
Aargau	15	351,130	147,630	Christian Democratic People's Party	351,594	3
Aargau	15	351,130	147,630	Green Party	95,205	0
Aargau	15	351,130	147,630	Evangelical People's Party	82,278	1
Aargau	15	351,130	147,630	Swiss Democrats	59,072	0
Aargau	15	351,130	147,630	Ring of Independents	43,402	0
Aargau	15	351,130	147,630	Freedom Party	30,884	0
Aargau	15	351,130	147,630	Federal Democratic Union	30,168	0
Aargau	15	351,130	147,630	Urs Wirth	3,051	0
Appenzell Ausserrhoden	2	35,716	18,278	Swiss People's Party	12,890	1
Appenzell Ausserrhoden	2	35,716	18,278	Free Democratic Party	11,268	1
Appenzell Ausserrhoden	2	35,716	18,278	Social Democratic Party	10,182	0
Appenzell Innerrhoden	1	9,959	5,130	Christian Democratic People's Party	3,754	1
Appenzell Innerrhoden	1	9,959	5,130	Swiss People's Party	1,314	0
Appenzell Innerrhoden	1	9,959	5,130	Others	37	0
Basel-Landschaft	7	175,116	73,184	Social Democratic Party	117,978	2
Basel-Landschaft	7	175,116	73,184	Free Democratic Party	111,517	2
Basel-Landschaft	7	175,116	73,184	Swiss People's Party	91,099	1
Basel-Landschaft	7	175,116	73,184	Christian Democratic People's Party	60,529	1
Basel-Landschaft	7	175,116	73,184	Swiss Democrats	51,014	0
Basel-Landschaft	7	175,116	73,184	Green Party	46,719	1
Basel-Landschaft	7	175,116	73,184	Evangelical People's Party	12,233	0
Basel-Landschaft	7	175,116	73,184	Sälbverständlich	11,710	0
Basel-Landschaft	7	175,116	73,184	Freedom Party	1,558	0
Basel-Landschaft	7	175,116	73,184	Red List of Critical Endangered Species	1,118	0
Basel-Stadt	6	117,588	55,770	Social Democratic Party	110,119	4
Basel-Stadt	6	117,588	55,770	Swiss People's Party	44,885	0
Basel-Stadt	6	117,588	55,770	Free Democratic Party	40,194	1
Basel-Stadt	6	117,588	55,770	Liberal Party	35,349	1
Basel-Stadt	6	117,588	55,770	Green Party	28,839	0
Basel-Stadt	6	117,588	55,770	Christian Democratic People's Party	28,432	0
Basel-Stadt	6	117,588	55,770	Democratic Social Party	15,100	0
Basel-Stadt	6	117,588	55,770	Swiss Democrats	12,696	0
Basel-Stadt	6	117,588	55,770	Evangelical People's Party	12,473	0
Basel-Stadt	6	117,588	55,770	Humanist Party	1,680	0
Basel-Stadt	6	117,588	55,770	Strong Basel	1,309	0
Bern	27	675,874	277,840	Swiss People's Party	2,099,834	8
Bern	27	675,874	277,840	Social Democratic Party	2,029,878	8
Bern	27	675,874	277,840	Free Democratic Party	1,263,455	5
Bern	27	675,874	277,840	Green Party	548,613	2
Bern	27	675,874	277,840	Evangelical People's Party	292,423	1
Bern	27	675,874	277,840	Federal Democratic Union	290,510	1
Bern	27	675,874	277,840	Swiss Democrats	273,464	1
Bern	27	675,874	277,840	Freedom Party	201,299	0
Bern	27	675,874	277,840	Christian Democratic People's Party	177,609	1
Bern	27	675,874	277,840	New List	89,722	0
Bern	27	675,874	277,840	Ring of Independents	56,298	0
Bern	27	675,874	277,840	Workers and Pensioners' Party	23,574	0
Bern	27	675,874	277,840	Humanist Party	7,978	0
Fribourg	6	156,868	64,697	Christian Democratic People's Party	126,236	3
Fribourg	6	156,868	64,697	Social Democratic Party	75,908	1
Fribourg	6	156,868	64,697	Free Democratic Party	55,227	1
Fribourg	6	156,868	64,697	Swiss People's Party	42,831	1
Fribourg	6	156,868	64,697	Christian Social Party	40,836	1
Fribourg	6	156,868	64,697	Independent-Solidarity	16,716	0
Fribourg	6	156,868	64,697	Independent Movement	6,334	0
Fribourg	6	156,868	64,697	Democratic Social Party	5,948	0
Fribourg	6	156,868	64,697	Future for All	1,684	0
Fribourg	6	156,868	64,697	Free Ecological Initiative	1,424	0
Fribourg	6	156,868	64,697	Swiss Democrats	1,223	0
Geneva	11	209,047	75,945	Social Democratic Party	161,435	2
Geneva	11	209,047	75,945	Liberal Party	149,455	2
Geneva	11	209,047	75,945	Christian Democratic People's Party	113,930	2
Geneva	11	209,047	75,945	Free Democratic Party	102,424	2
Geneva	11	209,047	75,945	Party of Labour	70,310	1
Geneva	11	209,047	75,945	Green Party	66,300	1
Geneva	11	209,047	75,945	Solidarity	64,977	1
Geneva	11	209,047	75,945	Swiss People's Party	60,208	0
Geneva	11	209,047	75,945	Union of Swiss Patriots	10,502	0
Geneva	11	209,047	75,945	Unity Against Social Dismantlement	5,011	0
Geneva	11	209,047	75,945	For A Better Future	3,435	0
Glarus	1	24,570	6,939	Social Democratic Party	5,179	1
Glarus	1	24,570	6,939	Others	866	0
Grisons	5	127,447	51,760	Swiss People's Party	66,936	2
Grisons	5	127,447	51,760	Social Democratic Party	66,010	1
Grisons	5	127,447	51,760	Christian Democratic People's Party	63,198	1
Grisons	5	127,447	51,760	Free Democratic Party	37,472	1
Grisons	5	127,447	51,760	Environmental List	5,650	0
Grisons	5	127,447	51,760	Adrian Steiger	3,595	0
Grisons	5	127,447	51,760	Forum for the Sovereign	2,432	0
Grisons	5	127,447	51,760	Free List	2,613	0
Jura	2	48,010	19,767	Christian Democratic People's Party	15,127	1
Jura	2	48,010	19,767	Social Democratic Party	13,187	1
Jura	2	48,010	19,767	Free Democratic Party	7,516	0
Jura	2	48,010	19,767	Swiss People's Party	2,771	0
Lucerne	10	230,726	122,004	Christian Democratic People's Party	409,318	4
Lucerne	10	230,726	122,004	Swiss People's Party	271,083	2
Lucerne	10	230,726	122,004	Free Democratic Party	269,786	2
Lucerne	10	230,726	122,004	Social Democratic Party	119,103	1
Lucerne	10	230,726	122,004	Green Party	95,182	1
Lucerne	10	230,726	122,004	Non-Partisan Movement	12,933	0
Lucerne	10	230,726	122,004	Swiss Democrats	9,972	0
Lucerne	10	230,726	122,004	Freedom Party	4,016	0
Neuchâtel	5	105,078	35,681	Social Democratic Party	48,061	2
Neuchâtel	5	105,078	35,681	Liberal Party	41,220	1
Neuchâtel	5	105,078	35,681	Free Democratic Party	35,280	2
Neuchâtel	5	105,078	35,681	Green Party	25,213	0
Neuchâtel	5	105,078	35,681	Party of Labour	11,795	0
Neuchâtel	5	105,078	35,681	Solidarity	4,559	0
Neuchâtel	5	105,078	35,681	Swiss Democrats	3,900	0
Neuchâtel	5	105,078	35,681	Unity Against Social Dismantlement	1,763	0
Nidwalden	1	26,805	12,340	Free Democratic Party	9,546	1
Nidwalden	1	26,805	12,340	Swiss Democrats	846	0
Nidwalden	1	26,805	12,340	Others	164	0
Obwalden	1	Elected unopposed		Christian Democratic People's Party		1
Schaffhausen	2	48,182	29,840	Free Democratic Party	22,823	1
Schaffhausen	2	48,182	29,840	Social Democratic Party	18,958	1
Schaffhausen	2	48,182	29,840	Swiss People's Party	14,695	0
Schwyz	3	84,406	41,838	Swiss People's Party	36,080	1
Schwyz	3	84,406	41,838	Christian Democratic People's Party	27,425	1
Schwyz	3	84,406	41,838	Free Democratic Party	19,234	1
Schwyz	3	84,406	41,838	Social Democratic Party	16,480	0
Schwyz	3	84,406	41,838	Pro Freie	1,001	0
Schwyz	3	84,406	41,838	Free and Independent Electorate	406	0
Solothurn	7	163,747	81,887	Social Democratic Party	153,457	2
Solothurn	7	163,747	81,887	Free Democratic Party	143,140	2
Solothurn	7	163,747	81,887	Christian Democratic People's Party	120,831	2
Solothurn	7	163,747	81,887	Swiss People's Party	104,777	1
Solothurn	7	163,747	81,887	Green Party	27,642	0
Solothurn	7	163,747	81,887	Freedom Party	7,324	0
Solothurn	7	163,747	81,887	Citizens' List	3,676	0
Solothurn	7	163,747	81,887	Humanist Hemp Party	3,438	0
St. Gallen	12	283,297	123,612	Swiss People's Party	401,904	3
St. Gallen	12	283,297	123,612	Christian Democratic People's Party	380,655	4
St. Gallen	12	283,297	123,612	Social Democratic Party	248,539	2
St. Gallen	12	283,297	123,612	Free Democratic Party	245,371	2
St. Gallen	12	283,297	123,612	Green Party	58,070	1
St. Gallen	12	283,297	123,612	Ring of Independents	27,331	0
St. Gallen	12	283,297	123,612	Swiss Democrats	20,152	0
St. Gallen	12	283,297	123,612	Evangelical People's Party	19,151	0
St. Gallen	12	283,297	123,612	Federal Democratic Union	14,715	0
St. Gallen	12	283,297	123,612	Freedom Party	14,046	0
St. Gallen	12	283,297	123,612	Youth - Independent - Green	10,166	0
St. Gallen	12	283,297	123,612	Free Bourgeoisie	8,318	0
St. Gallen	12	283,297	123,612	Youth List	7,347	0
Ticino	8	192,912	95,946	Free Democratic Party	204,753	2
Ticino	8	192,912	95,946	Christian Democratic People's Party	191,666	2
Ticino	8	192,912	95,946	Social Democratic Party	138,646	2
Ticino	8	192,912	95,946	Ticino League	136,944	2
Ticino	8	192,912	95,946	Swiss People's Party	39,145	0
Ticino	8	192,912	95,946	Green Party	10,471	0
Ticino	8	192,912	95,946	Party of Labour	9,922	0
Ticino	8	192,912	95,946	Liberal Socialists	3,342	0
Ticino	8	192,912	95,946	The Mood Breaker	3,043	0
Ticino	8	192,912	95,946	Evangelical People's Party	1,590	0
Thurgau	6	141,044	62,922	Swiss People's Party	122,995	3
Thurgau	6	141,044	62,922	Social Democratic Party	59,517	1
Thurgau	6	141,044	62,922	Christian Democratic People's Party	58,314	1
Thurgau	6	141,044	62,922	Free Democratic Party	54,333	1
Thurgau	6	141,044	62,922	Green Party	22,780	0
Thurgau	6	141,044	62,922	SMEs for Trade and Medium-Sized Companies	11,369	0
Thurgau	6	141,044	62,922	Evangelical People's Party	10,298	0
Thurgau	6	141,044	62,922	Freedom Party	9,891	1
Thurgau	6	141,044	62,922	Swiss Democrats	9,184	0
Thurgau	6	141,044	62,922	Federal Democratic Union	6,995	0
Thurgau	6	141,044	62,922	Catholic People's Party	3,412	0
Thurgau	6	141,044	62,922	Freedom, Law, Independence, Justice, Progress, Nature	661	0
Thurgau	6	141,044	62,922	Swiss Citizens' Vote	479	0
Uri	1	25,451	9,230	Free Democratic Party	6,721	1
Uri	1	25,451	9,230	Others	1,509	0
Vaud	17	365,522	115,306	Free Democratic Party	468,795	5
Vaud	17	365,522	115,306	Social Democratic Party	420,185	5
Vaud	17	365,522	115,306	Liberal Party	236,993	2
Vaud	17	365,522	115,306	Swiss People's Party	200,635	2
Vaud	17	365,522	115,306	Party of Labour	145,804	1
Vaud	17	365,522	115,306	Green Party	133,037	1
Vaud	17	365,522	115,306	Christian Democratic People's Party	84,497	1
Vaud	17	365,522	115,306	Federal Democratic Union	51,554	0
Vaud	17	365,522	115,306	Swiss Europe Renaissance	47,755	0
Vaud	17	365,522	115,306	Solidarity	39,426	0
Vaud	17	365,522	115,306	A3A Active Seniors Association	22,033	0
Vaud	17	365,522	115,306	Swiss Democrats	16,465	0
Vaud	17	365,522	115,306	Unity Against Social Dismantlement	6,256	0
Vaud	17	365,522	115,306	Straight Look Action	2,355	0
Valais	7	182,841	96,435	Christian Democratic People's Party	231,476	4
Valais	7	182,841	96,435	Free Democratic Party	119,134	2
Valais	7	182,841	96,435	Social Democratic Party	106,628	1
Valais	7	182,841	96,435	Christian Social Party	93,774	0
Valais	7	182,841	96,435	Swiss People's Party	56,742	0
Valais	7	182,841	96,435	Green Party	13,156	0
Valais	7	182,841	96,435	Liberal Party	11,680	0
Zug	3	64,457	34,487	Christian Democratic People's Party	26,735	1
Zug	3	64,457	34,487	Free Democratic Party	26,023	1
Zug	3	64,457	34,487	Social Democratic Party	23,604	0
Zug	3	64,457	34,487	Swiss People's Party	21,731	1
Zug	3	64,457	34,487	Senior Citizens	3,315	0
Zürich	34	780,462	353,340	Swiss People's Party	3,864,173	13
Zürich	34	780,462	353,340	Social Democratic Party	3,048,666	10
Zürich	34	780,462	353,340	Free Democratic Party	2,119,869	6
Zürich	34	780,462	353,340	Christian Democratic People's Party	609,457	2
Zürich	34	780,462	353,340	Green Party	492,017	1
Zürich	34	780,462	353,340	Evangelical People's Party	408,726	1
Zürich	34	780,462	353,340	Senior Citizens	260,926	0
Zürich	34	780,462	353,340	Ring of Independents	244,221	1
Zürich	34	780,462	353,340	Federal Democratic Union	209,452	0
Zürich	34	780,462	353,340	Swiss Democrats	183,811	0
Zürich	34	780,462	353,340	Alternative List	112,185	0
Zürich	34	780,462	353,340	Frauen macht Politik!	100,544	0
Zürich	34	780,462	353,340	Freedom Party	97,977	0
Zürich	34	780,462	353,340	SMEs and Trade	41,342	0
Zürich	34	780,462	353,340	Christian Social Party	25,929	0
Zürich	34	780,462	353,340	List for Tax Cuts	25,332	0
Zürich	34	780,462	353,340	Europe Party	21,302	0
Zürich	34	780,462	353,340	Liberal Party	18,305	0
Zürich	34	780,462	353,340	Humanist Party	11,951	0
Source: Bundesblatt, 7 December 1999

=== Council of the States ===
Party	Seats	+/–
Free Democratic Party	17	0
Christian Democratic People's Party	15	–1
Swiss People's Party	7	+2
Social Democratic Party	6	+1
Liberal Party	0	–2
Alliance of Independents	0	–1
Other parties	1	–
Total	46	0
Source: Nohlen & Stöver
