= Koechlin =

Koechlin is a Swiss-German and Alsatian surname. It may refer to:

== Persons ==
- Alphons Koechlin (politician) (1821–1893), Swiss politician and President of the Swiss Council of States (1874/1875)
- Alphons Koechlin (pastor) (1885–1965), Swiss pastor
- André Koechlin (1789–1875), French industrialist and the railroad equipment maker
- Carl Koechlin (politician) (1856–1914), Swiss politician
- Carl Koechlin (business executive) (1889–1969), Swiss business executive
- Charles Koechlin (1867-1950), French composer
- Éric Koechlin (1950-2014), French slalom canoer
- Jean Koechlin (born 1926), French botanist
- Jorge Koechlin (born 1950), Peruvian racing driver and magazine publisher
- Kalki Koechlin (born 1984) French actress
- Maurice Koechlin (1856–1946), French structural engineer
- Pedro Koechlin von Stein, Peruvian politician and entrepreneur
- Rudolf Koechlin (1862–1939), Austrian mineralogist

== See also ==
- Koechlin family, an Alsatian family
- Koechlin Island, an island off the northeast coast of Adelaide Island, Antarctica
