= List of members of the Federal Assembly from the Canton of Basel-Stadt =

Coat of Arms

This is a list of members of both houses of the Federal Assembly from the Canton of Basel-Stadt. As one of the cantons defined until 1999 as "half-cantons", Basel-Stadt elects only one member to the Council of States

== Members of the Council of States ==
Election	Councillor (Party)
Appointed	Johann Jakob Stehlin; Liberal Party; 1848–1853
Appointed	Joh. Rudolf Merian; Basel-Stadt Centre right 1853–1855
Appointed	August Stähelin; Basel-Stadt Centre right 1855–1860
Appointed	Georg Felber; Basel-Stadt Centre right 1860–1861
Appointed	August Stähelin; Basel-Stadt Centre right 1861–1866
Appointed	Alphons Koechlin; Basel-Stadt Centre right 1866–1875
Appointed	Karl Rudolf Stehlin; Basel-Stadt Centre right 1875–1881
Appointed	Chr. Friedrich Göttisheim; Free Democratic Party; 1881–1881
Appointed	Wilhelm Klein; Free Democratic Party; 1881–1896
Appointed	Paul Scherrer; Free Democratic Party; 1896–1919
Appointed	Victor Emil Scherer; Free Democratic Party; 1919–1925
Appointed	Eugen Wullschleger; Social Democratic Party; 1925–1928
Appointed	Ernst-Alfred Thalmann; Free Democratic Party; 1928–1935
Appointed	Gustav Wenk; Social Democratic Party; 1935–1956
Appointed	Hans-Peter Tschudi; Social Democratic Party; 1956–1959
Appointed	Eugen Dietschi; Free Democratic Party; 1960–1967
1963	Eugen Dietschi; Free Democratic Party; 1960–1967
1967	Willi Wenk; Social Democratic Party; 1967–1979
1971	Willi Wenk; Social Democratic Party; 1967–1979
1975	Willi Wenk; Social Democratic Party; 1967–1979
1979	Carl jun. Miville; Social Democratic Party; 1979–1991
1983	Carl jun. Miville; Social Democratic Party; 1979–1991
1987	Carl jun. Miville; Social Democratic Party; 1979–1991
1991	Gian-Reto Plattner; Social Democratic Party; 1991–2003
1995	Gian-Reto Plattner; Social Democratic Party; 1991–2003
1999	Gian-Reto Plattner; Social Democratic Party; 1991–2003
2003	Anita Fetz; Social Democratic Party; 2003–2019
2007	Anita Fetz; Social Democratic Party; 2003–2019
2011	Anita Fetz; Social Democratic Party; 2003–2019
2015	Anita Fetz; Social Democratic Party; 2003–2019
2019	Eva Herzog; Social Democratic Party; 2019–present
2023	Eva Herzog; Social Democratic Party; 2019–present

== Members of the National Council ==
Election	Councillor (Party)	Councillor (Party)	Councillor (Party)	Councillor (Party)	Councillor (Party)	Councillor (Party)	Councillor (Party)	Councillor (Party)
1848	Achilles Bischoff (Basel-Stadt Centre right)	1 seat 1848–1863						
1851	Achilles Bischoff (Basel-Stadt Centre right)	1 seat 1848–1863						
1853	Johann Jakob Stehlin (Liberal)	1 seat 1848–1863						
1854	Johann Jakob Stehlin (Liberal)	1 seat 1848–1863						
1857	Johann Jakob Stehlin (Liberal)	1 seat 1848–1863						
1860	Johann Jakob Stehlin (Liberal)	1 seat 1848–1863						
1863	Johann Jakob Stehlin (Liberal)	Wilhelm Klein (FDP/PRD)	2 seats 1863–1863					
1866	Johann Jakob Stehlin (Liberal)	Wilhelm Klein (FDP/PRD)	2 seats 1863–1863					
1869	Johann Jakob Stehlin (Liberal)	Wilhelm Klein (FDP/PRD)	2 seats 1863–1863					
1872	Johann Jakob Stehlin (Liberal)	Wilhelm Klein (FDP/PRD)	2 seats 1863–1863					
1875	Karl Burckhardt (LPS/PLS)	Wilhelm Klein (FDP/PRD)	2 seats 1863–1863					
1878	Karl Burckhardt (LPS/PLS)	Joh. Rudolf Geigy (Zent)	2 seats 1863–1863					
1881	Karl Burckhardt (LPS/PLS)	Joh. Rudolf Geigy (Zent)	Wilhelm Klein (FDP/PRD)	3 seats 1881–1890				
1884	Karl Burckhardt (LPS/PLS)	Joh. Rudolf Geigy (Zent)	Wilhelm Klein (FDP/PRD)	3 seats 1881–1890				
1887	Karl Burckhardt (LPS/PLS)	Ernst Brenner (FDP/PRD)	Eduard Eckenstein (FDP/PRD)	3 seats 1881–1890				
1889	Paul Speiser (LPS/PLS)	Ernst Brenner (FDP/PRD)	Eduard Eckenstein (FDP/PRD)	3 seats 1881–1890				
1890	Paul Speiser (LPS/PLS)	Ernst Brenner (FDP/PRD)	Eduard Eckenstein (FDP/PRD)	Hermann G. D. Kinkelin (FDP/PRD)	4 seats 1890–1899			
1893	Paul Speiser (LPS/PLS)	Ernst Brenner (FDP/PRD)	Emil Bischoff (LPS/PLS)	Hermann G. D. Kinkelin (FDP/PRD)	4 seats 1890–1899			
1896	Isaac A. Iselin (LPS/PLS)	Ernst Brenner (FDP/PRD)	Eugen Wullschleger (Grut&PS*)	Hermann G. D. Kinkelin (FDP/PRD)	4 seats 1890–1899			
1897	Isaac A. Iselin (LPS/PLS)	Carl Koechlin (LPS/PLS)	Eugen Wullschleger (Grut&PS*)	Hermann G. D. Kinkelin (FDP/PRD)	4 seats 1890–1899			
1899	Isaac A. Iselin (LPS/PLS)	Carl Koechlin (LPS/PLS)	Eugen Wullschleger (Grut&PS*)	Heinrich David (FDP/PRD)	4 seats 1890–1899			
1902	Isaac A. Iselin (LPS/PLS)	Paul Speiser (LPS/PLS)	Alfred Brüstlein (SRF (BS)*)	Heinrich David (FDP/PRD)	Joh. Emil Müry (FDP/PRD)	Otto Zoller (FDP/PRD)	6 seats 1902–1912	
1905	Isaac A. Iselin (LPS/PLS)	Paul Speiser (LPS/PLS)	Alfred Brüstlein (SRF (BS)*)	Heinrich David (FDP/PRD)	Joh. Emil Müry (FDP/PRD)	Emil Göttisheim (FDP/PRD)	6 seats 1902–1912	
1908	Isaac A. Iselin (LPS/PLS)	Paul Speiser (LPS/PLS)	Alfred Brüstlein (SRF (BS)*)	Christian Rothenberger (FDP/PRD)	Joh. Emil Müry (FDP/PRD)	Emil Göttisheim (FDP/PRD)	6 seats 1902–1912	
1911	Isaac A. Iselin (LPS/PLS)	Carl Christoph Burckhardt (LPS/PLS)	Johannes L. Frei (SP/PS)	Christian Rothenberger (FDP/PRD)	Bernhard Jäggi (Grut&PS)	Emil Göttisheim (FDP/PRD)	6 seats 1902–1912	
1912	Isaac A. Iselin (LPS/PLS)	Carl Christoph Burckhardt (LPS/PLS)	Johannes L. Frei (SP/PS)	Christian Rothenberger (FDP/PRD)	Bernhard Jäggi (Grut&PS)	Emil Göttisheim (FDP/PRD)	Eugen Wullschleger (SP/PS)	1 seats 1912–1947
1914	Isaac A. Iselin (LPS/PLS)	Carl Christoph Burckhardt (LPS/PLS)	Johannes L. Frei (SP/PS)	Christian Rothenberger (FDP/PRD)	Bernhard Jäggi (Grut&PS)	Emil Göttisheim (FDP/PRD)	Eugen Wullschleger (SP/PS)	1 seats 1912–1947
1915	Isaac A. Iselin (LPS/PLS)	Paul Speiser (LPS/PLS)	Johannes L. Frei (SP/PS)	Christian Rothenberger (FDP/PRD)	Bernhard Jäggi (Grut&PS)	Emil Göttisheim (FDP/PRD)	Eugen Wullschleger (SP/PS)	1 seats 1912–1947
1917	Ernst Feigenwinter (Conservative)	Paul Speiser (LPS/PLS)	Johannes L. Frei (SP/PS)	Christian Rothenberger (FDP/PRD)	Rudolf Arnold Gelpke (FP*)	Emil Göttisheim (FDP/PRD)	Karl-Oskar Schär (SD/DS)	1 seats 1912–1947
1919	Max Johann Z'graggen (Conservative)	Rudolf Miescher (LPS/PLS)	Fritz E. Hauser (SP/PS)	Friedrich Schneider (SP/PS)	Rudolf Arnold Gelpke (FP*)	Albert Belmont (SP/PS)	Karl-Oskar Schär (SD/DS)	1 seats 1912–1947
1922	Max Johann Z'graggen (Conservative)	Rudolf Miescher (LPS/PLS)	Fritz E. Hauser (SP/PS)	Friedrich Schneider (SP/PS)	Rudolf Arnold Gelpke (FP*)	Albert Belmont (SP/PS)	Karl-Oskar Schär (SD/DS)	1 seats 1912–1947
1925	Max Johann Z'graggen (Conservative)	Rudolf Miescher (LPS/PLS)	Fritz E. Hauser (SP/PS)	Friedrich Schneider (SP/PS)	Rudolf Arnold Gelpke (FP*)	Franz Welti (Communist)	Karl-Oskar Schär (SD/DS)	1 seats 1912–1947
1928	Max Johann Z'graggen (Conservative)	Rudolf Miescher (LPS/PLS)	Fritz E. Hauser (SP/PS)	Friedrich Schneider (SP/PS)	Rudolf Arnold Gelpke (FP*)	Franz Welti (Communist)	Karl-Oskar Schär (SD/DS)	1 seats 1912–1947
1929	Max Johann Z'graggen (Conservative)	Rudolf Miescher (LPS/PLS)	Fritz E. Hauser (SP/PS)	Friedrich Schneider (SP/PS)	Rudolf Arnold Gelpke (FP*)	Franz Welti (Communist)	Victor Emil Scherer (FDP/PRD)	1 seats 1912–1947
1931	Max Johann Z'graggen (Conservative)	Albert Oeri (LPS/PLS)	Fritz E. Hauser (SP/PS)	Friedrich Schneider (SP/PS)	Rudolf Arnold Gelpke (FP*)	Franz Welti (Communist)	Victor Emil Scherer (FDP/PRD)	1 seats 1912–1947
1932	Max Johann Z'graggen (Conservative)	Albert Oeri (LPS/PLS)	Fritz E. Hauser (SP/PS)	Friedrich Schneider (SP/PS)	Rudolf Arnold Gelpke (FP*)	Emil Arnold (Communist)	Victor Emil Scherer (FDP/PRD)	1 seats 1912–1947
1934	Max Johann Z'graggen (Conservative)	Albert Oeri (LPS/PLS)	Fritz E. Hauser (SP/PS)	Friedrich Schneider (SP/PS)	Rudolf Arnold Gelpke (FP*)	Marino Bodenmann (Communist)	Victor Emil Scherer (FDP/PRD)	1 seats 1912–1947
1935	Wilhelm Meile (Conservative)	Albert Oeri (LPS/PLS)	Fritz E. Hauser (SP/PS)	Friedrich Schneider (SP/PS)	Ernst Herzog (SP/PS)	Marino Bodenmann (Communist)	Victor Emil Scherer (FDP/PRD)	1 seats 1912–1947
1938	Rudolf Niederhauser (Conservative)	Albert Oeri (LPS/PLS)	Fritz E. Hauser (SP/PS)	Friedrich Schneider (SP/PS)	Ernst Herzog (SP/PS)	Marino Bodenmann (Communist)	Victor Emil Scherer (FDP/PRD)	1 seats 1912–1947
1939	Rudolf Niederhauser (Conservative)	Albert Oeri (LPS/PLS)	Fritz E. Hauser (SP/PS)	Arnold Gfeller (LDU/LdI)	Ernst Herzog (SP/PS)	Walter Muschg (LDU/LdI)	Victor Emil Scherer (FDP/PRD)	1 seats 1912–1947
1941	Rudolf Niederhauser (Conservative)	Albert Oeri (LPS/PLS)	Friedrich Schneider (SP/PS)	Arnold Gfeller (LDU/LdI)	Ernst Herzog (SP/PS)	Walter Muschg (LDU/LdI)	Eugen Dietschi (FDP/PRD)	1 seats 1912–1947
1943	Rudolf Niederhauser (Conservative)	Albert Oeri (LPS/PLS)	Friedrich Schneider (SP/PS)	Carl Miville (SP/PS)	Ernst Herzog (SP/PS)	Nicolas Jaquet (LPS/PLS)	Eugen Dietschi (FDP/PRD)	1 seats 1912–1947
1947	Theodor Brogle (Conservative)	Albert Oeri (LPS/PLS)	Friedrich Schneider (SP/PS)	Carl Miville (SP/PS)	Ernst Herzog (SP/PS)	Hans Bernoulli (LDU/LdI)	Eugen Dietschi (FDP/PRD)	Alfred Schaller (FDP/PRD)
1949	Theodor Brogle (Conservative)	Nicolas Jaquet (LPS/PLS)	Friedrich Schneider (SP/PS)	Carl Miville (SP/PS)	Ernst Herzog (SP/PS)	Hans Bernoulli (LDU/LdI)	Eugen Dietschi (FDP/PRD)	Alfred Schaller (FDP/PRD)
1951	Fritz Berger (Conservative)	Nicolas Jaquet (LPS/PLS)	Emil Arnold (PdA/PST)	Fritz Brechbühl (SP/PS)	Ernst Herzog (SP/PS)	Arnold Gfeller (LDU/LdI)	Eugen Dietschi (FDP/PRD)	Alfred Schaller (FDP/PRD)
1953	Fritz Berger (Conservative)	Nicolas Jaquet (LPS/PLS)	Marino Bodenmann (PdA/PST)	Fritz Brechbühl (SP/PS)	Ernst Herzog (SP/PS)	Arnold Gfeller (LDU/LdI)	Eugen Dietschi (FDP/PRD)	Alfred Schaller (FDP/PRD)
1955	Fritz Berger (Conservative)	Nicolas Jaquet (LPS/PLS)	Marino Bodenmann (PdA/PST)	Fritz Brechbühl (SP/PS)	Ernst Herzog (SP/PS)	Arnold Gfeller (LDU/LdI)	Eugen Dietschi (FDP/PRD)	Alfred Schaller (FDP/PRD)
1959	Fritz Berger (Conservative)	Peter Dürrenmatt (LPS/PLS)	Edmund Wyss (SP/PS)	Fritz Brechbühl (SP/PS)	Ernst Herzog (SP/PS)	Rudolf Suter (LDU/LdI)	Eugen Dietschi (FDP/PRD)	Alfred Schaller (FDP/PRD)
1960	Fritz Berger (Conservative)	Peter Dürrenmatt (LPS/PLS)	Edmund Wyss (SP/PS)	Fritz Brechbühl (SP/PS)	Ernst Herzog (SP/PS)	Rudolf Suter (LDU/LdI)	Alfred Gasser (FDP/PRD)	Alfred Schaller (FDP/PRD)
1963	Albin Breitenmoser (CCS)	Peter Dürrenmatt (LPS/PLS)	Edmund Wyss (SP/PS)	Helmut Hubacher (SP/PS)	Ernst Herzog (SP/PS)	Walter Allgöwer (LDU/LdI)	Alfred Gasser (FDP/PRD)	Alfred Schaller (FDP/PRD)
1965	Albin Breitenmoser (CCS)	Peter Dürrenmatt (LPS/PLS)	Edmund Wyss (SP/PS)	Helmut Hubacher (SP/PS)	Ernst Herzog (SP/PS)	Walter Allgöwer (LDU/LdI)	Max Imboden (FDP/PRD)	Alfred Schaller (FDP/PRD)
1967	Albin Breitenmoser (CCS)	Peter Dürrenmatt (LPS/PLS)	Edmund Wyss (SP/PS)	Helmut Hubacher (SP/PS)	Andreas Gerwig (SP/PS)	Walter Allgöwer (LDU/LdI)	Arnold Schneider (FDP/PRD)	Alfred Schaller (FDP/PRD)
1971	Albin Breitenmoser (CCS)	Peter Dürrenmatt (LPS/PLS)	Walter Jaeger (N)	Helmut Hubacher (SP/PS)	Andreas Gerwig (SP/PS)	Walter Allgöwer (LDU/LdI)	7 seats 1871–1983	Alfred Schaller (FDP/PRD)
1975	Karl Schnyder (SP/PS)	Peter Dürrenmatt (LPS/PLS)	Gertrud Spiess (CVP/PDC)	Helmut Hubacher (SP/PS)	Andreas Gerwig (SP/PS)	Walter Allgöwer (LDU/LdI)	7 seats 1871–1983	Alfred Schaller (FDP/PRD)
1977	Karl Schnyder (SP/PS)	Peter Dürrenmatt (LPS/PLS)	Gertrud Spiess (CVP/PDC)	Helmut Hubacher (SP/PS)	Andreas Gerwig (SP/PS)	Walter Allgöwer (LDU/LdI)	7 seats 1871–1983	Paul Wyss (FDP/PRD)
1978	Carl jun. Miville (SP/PS)	Peter Dürrenmatt (LPS/PLS)	Gertrud Spiess (CVP/PDC)	Helmut Hubacher (SP/PS)	Andreas Gerwig (SP/PS)	Walter Allgöwer (LDU/LdI)	7 seats 1871–1983	Paul Wyss (FDP/PRD)
1979	Alexander Euler (SP/PS)	David Linder (LPS/PLS)	Gertrud Spiess (CVP/PDC)	Helmut Hubacher (SP/PS)	Andreas Gerwig (SP/PS)	Ruth Mascarin-Bircher (PdA/PST)	7 seats 1871–1983	Paul Wyss (FDP/PRD)
1983	Alexander Euler (SP/PS)	Hansjürg Weder (LDU/LdI)	Hugo Wick (CVP/PDC)	Helmut Hubacher (SP/PS)	6 seats 1983–2003	Ruth Mascarin-Bircher (PdA/PST)	6 seats 1983–2003	Paul Wyss (FDP/PRD)
1985	Alexander Euler (SP/PS)	Hansjürg Weder (LDU/LdI)	Hugo Wick (CVP/PDC)	Helmut Hubacher (SP/PS)	6 seats 1983–2003	Anita Fetz (POCH)	6 seats 1983–2003	Paul Wyss (FDP/PRD)
1987	Alexander Euler (SP/PS)	Hansjürg Weder (LDU/LdI)	Martin Burckhardt (LPS/PLS)	Helmut Hubacher (SP/PS)	6 seats 1983–2003	Anita Fetz (POCH)	6 seats 1983–2003	Paul Wyss (FDP/PRD)
1990	Alexander Euler (SP/PS)	Hansjürg Weder (LDU/LdI)	Martin Burckhardt (LPS/PLS)	Helmut Hubacher (SP/PS)	6 seats 1983–2003	Thomas Baerlocher (PdA/PST)	6 seats 1983–2003	Paul Wyss (FDP/PRD)
1991	Margrith von Felten (SP/PS)	Hansjürg Weder (LDU/LdI)	Christoph Eymann (LPS/PLS)	Helmut Hubacher (SP/PS)	6 seats 1983–2003	Hugo Wick (CVP/PDC)	6 seats 1983–2003	Paul Wyss (FDP/PRD)
1994	Margrith von Felten (SP/PS)	Hansjürg Weder (LDU/LdI)	Christoph Eymann (LPS/PLS)	Helmut Hubacher (SP/PS)	6 seats 1983–2003	Hugo Wick (CVP/PDC)	6 seats 1983–2003	Stefan Cornaz (FDP/PRD)
1995	Margrith von Felten (SP/PS)	Remo Gysin (SP/PS)	Christoph Eymann (LPS/PLS)	Helmut Hubacher (SP/PS)	6 seats 1983–2003	Rudolf Rechsteiner (SP/PS)	6 seats 1983–2003	Johannes Randegger (FDP/PRD)
1998	Margrith von Felten (SP/PS)	Remo Gysin (SP/PS)	Christoph Eymann (LPS/PLS)	Christine Keller (SP/PS)	6 seats 1983–2003	Rudolf Rechsteiner (SP/PS)	6 seats 1983–2003	Johannes Randegger (FDP/PRD)
1999	Jean Henri Dunant (SVP/UDC)	Remo Gysin (SP/PS)	Christoph Eymann (LPS/PLS)	Anita Fetz (SP/PS)	6 seats 1983–2003	Rudolf Rechsteiner (SP/PS)	6 seats 1983–2003	Johannes Randegger (FDP/PRD)
2001	Jean Henri Dunant (SVP/UDC)	Remo Gysin (SP/PS)	Christine Wirz-von Planta (LPS/PLS)	Anita Fetz (SP/PS)	6 seats 1983–2003	Rudolf Rechsteiner (SP/PS)	6 seats 1983–2003	Johannes Randegger (FDP/PRD)
2003	Jean Henri Dunant (SVP/UDC)	Remo Gysin (SP/PS)	5 seats 2003-2023	Silvia Schenker (SP/PS)	5 seats 2003-2023	Rudolf Rechsteiner (SP/PS)	5 seats 2003-2023	Johannes Randegger (FDP/PRD)
2006	Jean Henri Dunant (SVP/UDC)	Remo Gysin (SP/PS)	5 seats 2003-2023	Silvia Schenker (SP/PS)	5 seats 2003-2023	Rudolf Rechsteiner (SP/PS)	5 seats 2003-2023	Urs Schweizer (FDP/PRD)
2007	Jean Henri Dunant (SVP/UDC)	Anita Lachenmeier-Thüring (GPS/PES)	5 seats 2003-2023	Silvia Schenker (SP/PS)	5 seats 2003-2023	Rudolf Rechsteiner (SP/PS)	5 seats 2003-2023	Peter Malama (FDP/PRD / FDP.The Liberals)
2010	Sebastian Frehner (SVP/UDC)	Anita Lachenmeier-Thüring (GPS/PES)	5 seats 2003-2023	Silvia Schenker (SP/PS)	5 seats 2003-2023	Beat Jans (SP/PS)	5 seats 2003-2023	Peter Malama (FDP/PRD / FDP.The Liberals)
2011	Sebastian Frehner (SVP/UDC)	Markus Lehmann (CVP/PDC)	5 seats 2003-2023	Silvia Schenker (SP/PS)	5 seats 2003-2023	Beat Jans (SP/PS)	5 seats 2003-2023	Peter Malama (FDP/PRD / FDP.The Liberals)
2012	Sebastian Frehner (SVP/UDC)	Markus Lehmann (CVP/PDC)	5 seats 2003-2023	Silvia Schenker (SP/PS)	5 seats 2003-2023	Beat Jans (SP/PS)	5 seats 2003-2023	Daniel Stolz (FDP.The Liberals)
2015	Sebastian Frehner (SVP/UDC)	Sibel Arslan (BastA)	5 seats 2003-2023	Silvia Schenker (SP/PS)	5 seats 2003-2023	Beat Jans (SP/PS)	5 seats 2003-2023	Christoph Eymann (PLD)
2019	Sibel Arslan (GP/PV)	Katja Christ (GLP/PVL)	5 seats 2003-2023	Mustafa Atici (SP/PS)	5 seats 2003-2023	Beat Jans (SP/PS)	5 seats 2003-2023	Christoph Eymann (PLD)
2023	Sibel Arslan (GP/PV)	Katja Christ (GLP/PVL)	4 seats 2023-present	Sarah Wyss (SP/PS)	4 seats 2023-present			Patricia von Falkenstein (FDP.The Liberals)
