= Alphons Koechlin =

Alphons Koechlin may refer to:

- Alphons Koechlin (politician) (1821–1893), Swiss politician and President of the Council of States
- Alphons Koechlin (pastor) (1885–1965), Swiss pastor, his grandson

== See also ==
- Koechlin family
