= Carl Koechlin =

Carl Koechlin may refer to:

- Carl Koechlin (politician) (1856–1914), Swiss politician, businessman and army officer
- Carl Koechlin (business executive) (1889–1969), Swiss business executive, his son

== See also ==
- Koechlin family
