= Niggeler =

Niggeler is a surname. Notable people with the surname include:

- Michele Niggeler (born 1992), Swiss and Italian épée fencer
- Niklaus Niggeler (1817–1872), Swiss politician
