= DMC (company) =

Alsatian textile company created in Mulhouse, France

- Native name: Dollfus-Mieg et Compagnie
- Industry: Textiles
- Founded: 1746
- Headquarters: 13 Rue de Pfastatt, 68200, Mulhouse, France
- Products: Textiles
- Website: www.dmc.com

Dollfus-Mieg et Compagnie (abbreviated as DMC), is an Alsatian textile company created in Mulhouse, France in 1746 by Jean-Henri Dollfus. During the twentieth century, it was one of the largest European textile and industry groups. DMC was the owner and then shareholder of the Ronchamp coal mines. Listed on the Paris stock exchange since 1922, it merged with the Lille company Thiriez and Cartier-Bresson in 1961. After going through a crisis in the 1990s, the old company was liquidated in 2009. In September 2016, the British investment fund BlueGem Capital Partners purchased 100% of the capital of DMC.

== History ==
=== Eighteenth century ===
Printing on fabrics was introduced into Mulhouse (or rather the Republic of Mulhouse), in the middle of the 18th century, allowed the bourgeoisie to manufacture indiennes fabric, which made their fortune. Among the bourgeoisie was the Dollfus family, which was linked to the Koechlin and Engel families. These families included many entrepreneurs, such as Jean-Henri Dollfus.

At the end of the 18th century, the Dollfus family set up a factory in the neighboring village of Dornach (today integrated into the city of Mulhouse), along a stream, the Steinbaechlein, which was favorable for the treatment of fabrics. The region of Mulhouse thus plays, after Geneva, a central role in the history of indiennes in Europe.

=== Nineteenth century ===
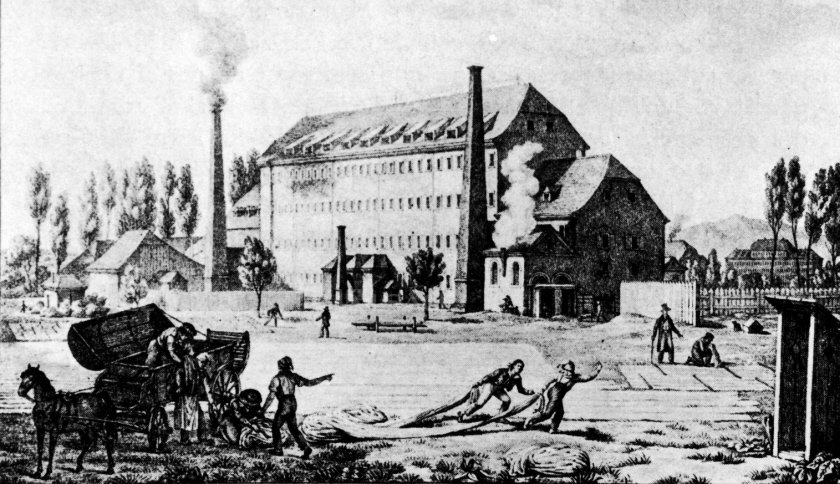
DMC mill in the 19th century

Daniel Dollfus, a nephew of Jean-Henri Dollfus, was able to take over the company thanks to the contribution of his wife Anne-Marie Mieg. He restructured the company as Dollfus-Mieg et Compagnie, which was officially created on 21 March 1800. The business diversified under the First Empire, with the introduction of weaving and mechanical spinning. These enabled it to control the different phases of fabric manufacturing on the same site. André Koechlin (who was mayor of Mulhouse twice, from 1830 to 1831 and from 1832 to 1843) took over the management in 1818. An engineer in the André Koechlin & Cie company, Émile Koechlin (mayor of Mulhouse from 1848 to 1852), also participated in the business.

From its creation, the company was the main client of the Ronchamp coal mines, and in 1812 became its owner. However, in 1843, the widow of Daniel Dollfus had to sell the mines because of poor earnings. Nevertheless, the company remained on the board of directors and remained the main client and shareholder.

In 1841, Emile Dollfus (brother of Jean Dollfus, director of DMC, mayor of Mulhouse in 1843 who succeeded his brother-in-law, André Koechlin, and future initiator of the working class city of Mulhouse) added the manufacture of thread sewing to the activities of DMC, the specialty that has made the reputation of the company.

The company also continued printing fabrics and was the first company to use a machine capable of printing 12 colors. Frédéric-Engel Dollfus (1818–1883), a follower of Saint-Simon, joined DMC as an associate in 1843. In particular, he developed the production of sewing thread and embroidery cotton, sold worldwide, and mechanized production. In 1870, he took an active part in the economic negotiations which preceded and followed the Treaty of Frankfurt between Prussia and France. He was a member of the Commission for the Defense of Alsatian Interests, and was sent to Tours to the Government of National Defense of 1870.

Frédéric-Engel Dollfus created for the workers of the company an emergency and retirement fund, group insurance, a nursing home for the elderly, a society to encourage savings, schools and facilities for children (a predecessor of kindergarten). He also created a clinic for sick children in Mulhouse. Finally, he founded the Preventive Accidents Association, in which several manufacturers participated. This association aimed to prevent accidents at work; their inspectors controlled the associated factories. This initiative partially influenced the promulgation of the laws of 1871 (in Germany) and 1874 (in France) relating to the improvement of the working conditions of workers from the point of view of safety and health.

Frédéric-Engel Dollfus also helped found the drawing school intended to train draughtsmen for the painted canvas industry and the Mulhouse spinning and weaving school (now known as the École Nationale Supérieure d'Ingénieurs Sud Alsace). In the 1870s, Frédéric-Engel devoted himself more and more to his philanthropic activities, and gave way in the company to his four sons, Frédéric, Alfred, Gustave and Eugène Engel. The members of the company were divided regarding their future development: the Dolfuses wanted to focus on producing printed textiles while the Engels emphasized the production of sewing/embroidery thread. In 1877, Jean Dollfus left as a company manager. Frédéric-Engel Dollfus and Gustave Dollfus remained. The latter, a nephew of Jean and the son of Emile, is the last of the Dollfus family who remained in the company).

In 1888, the Indian factory was liquidated because it had deficits.

Meanwhile, Jean Dollfus-Mieg met the Austrian embroidery designer Thérèse de Dillmont during the Universal Exhibition of 1878. He recognized the importance of Thérèse de Dillmont's embroidery creations and the potential it would bring to the company. He managed to persuade her to come and settle in Dornach, where the DMC company is located, in order to found an embroidery school there. It was not until 1884 that Thérèse de Dillmont left the Vienna Embroidery Academy to settle in Mulhouse. It was there that she wrote her famous Encyclopedia of Needlework, the first edition of which dates to 1886.

Embroidery motifs book

=== Twentieth century ===
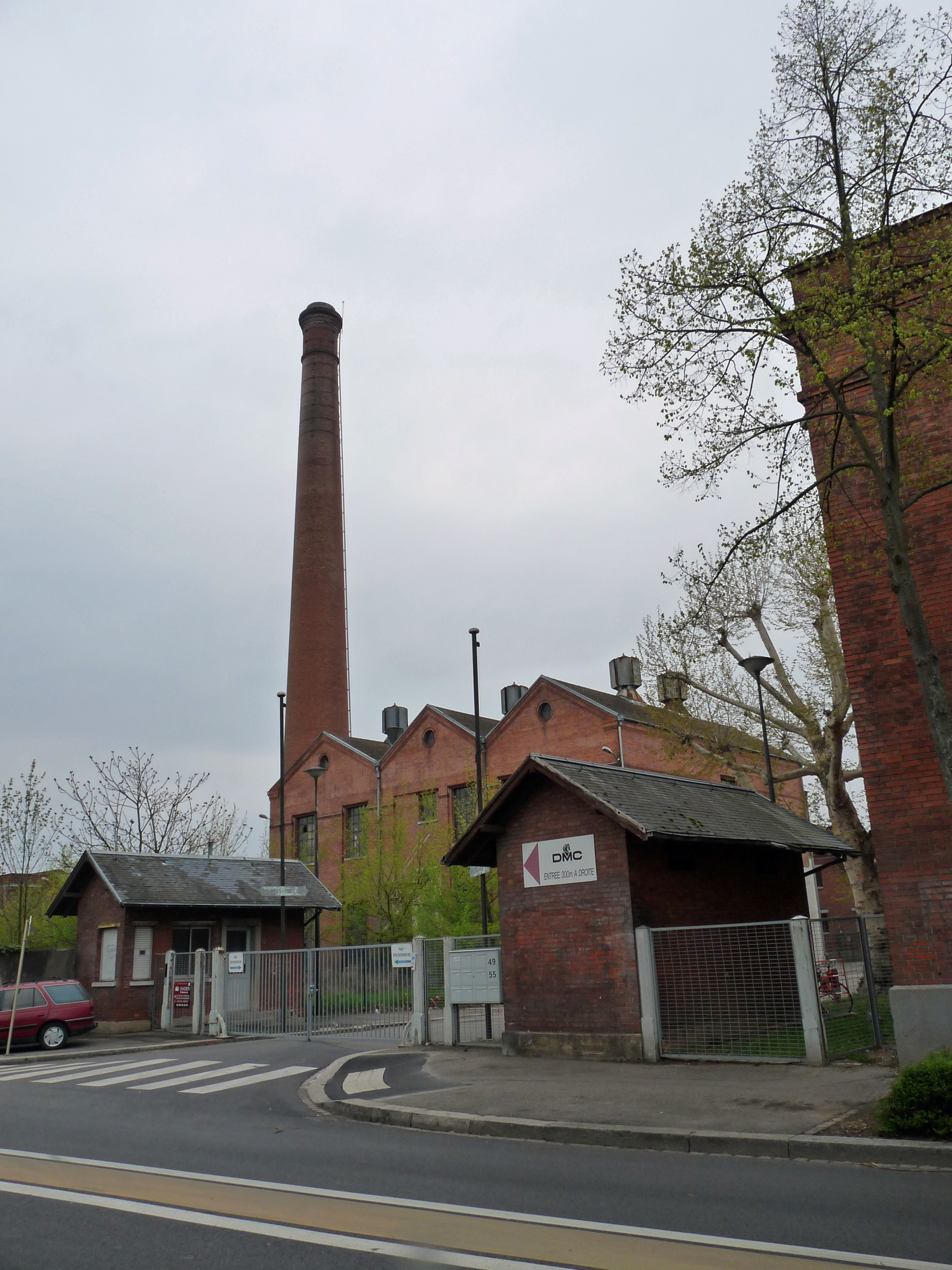
Entrance to the Mulhouse factory

In 1922, DMC was listed on the Paris stock exchange. During the German occupation of France in the Second World War, the company worked for the Nazis in war production. In 1961, it merged with the Lille company Thiriez and Cartier-Bresson. The Mulhouse company kept its corporate name but replaced its logo, a bell, with that of Thiriez, a horse's head. In the 1960s, the company had up to 30,000 employees. DMC also diversified into weaving (fabrics in Remiremont and Bruay in Artois, dyed woven fabrics in Roanne, terry cloth in Albert), in fabric printing (Texunion in Pfastatt and KBC in Lörrach), and in household linen (Descamps in Lille).The group also had a factory for zippers (Winged Closure with Airaines ) and has been engaged in publishing (Éditions DMC specializing in books on sewing and embroidery works and Éditions Mame in Tours). It is to the DMC editions that we owe the Encyclopedia of Needlework by Thérèse de Dillmont, an essential reference work for all needlework.

DMC suffered oil-related shocks and Asian competition as a part of the European textile crisis. In 1990, the workforce had been halved to 15,000 employees. Printed textiles were also going out of fashion. The group tried to diversify by launching approximately twenty Loisirs et Création stores offering embroidery and interior decoration items. The decline continued and from 10,000 employees in 1998, it had only about 1,100 ten years later.

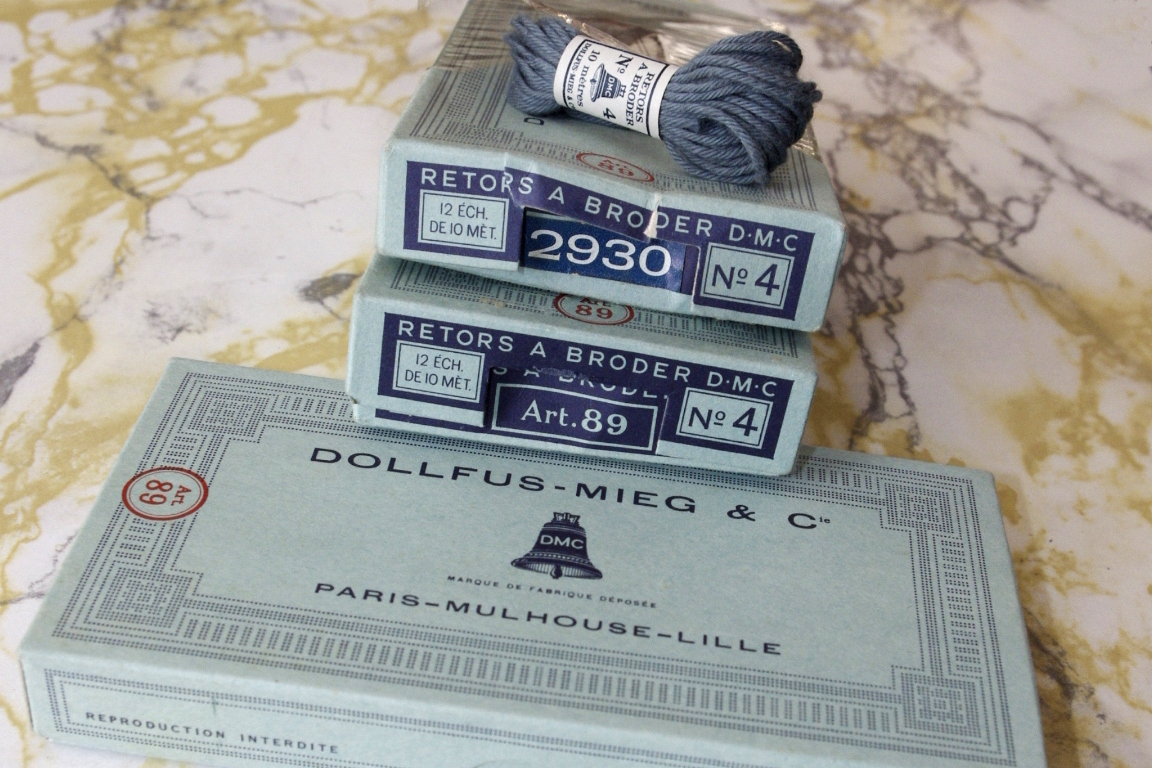
Boxes of DMC cotton

=== Twenty-first century ===
Led by Jacques Boubal and his right-hand man Dominique Poile, the restructuring continued, By 2008, the company had only around 800 people. In addition to the stores, the group only kept the manufacture of velvet (SAIC Velcorex) and embroidery thread (DMC), but accumulated liabilities approached €100 million (equivalent to €129.8 million in 2025) by May 2008, culminating in its cessation of payments.

The consulting company Bernard Krief Consulting (led by Louis Petiet and now Krief Group) took over, as part of a disposal plan, the velvet activity of SAIC Velcorex in August 2008 (which was liquidated in March 2010) and the embroidery thread activity in December 2008. Bernard Krief Consulting appointed, as president of the new DMC SAS, the former manager Dominique Poile to whom he sold capital in 2009, in violation of the law.

On 18 February 2009, the judicial liquidation of the old company was pronounced by the Paris Commercial Court. In 2011, the plan to sell the embroidery thread activity was challenged by the filing of a complaint for fraud in the December 2008 judgment. In June 2016, the British investment fund BlueGem Capital Partners announced its intention to buy 100% of the capital of DMC. The repurchase was made in September 2016. In February 2019 the DMC company was acquired by the British investment fund Lion Capital.

In September 2023, the DMC company acquired the Anchor thread brand, together with the related brands of Domino and Puppets from the MEZ Crafts Group for an undefined amount.
