= Eyles Irwin =

Irish poet and writer (1751–1817)

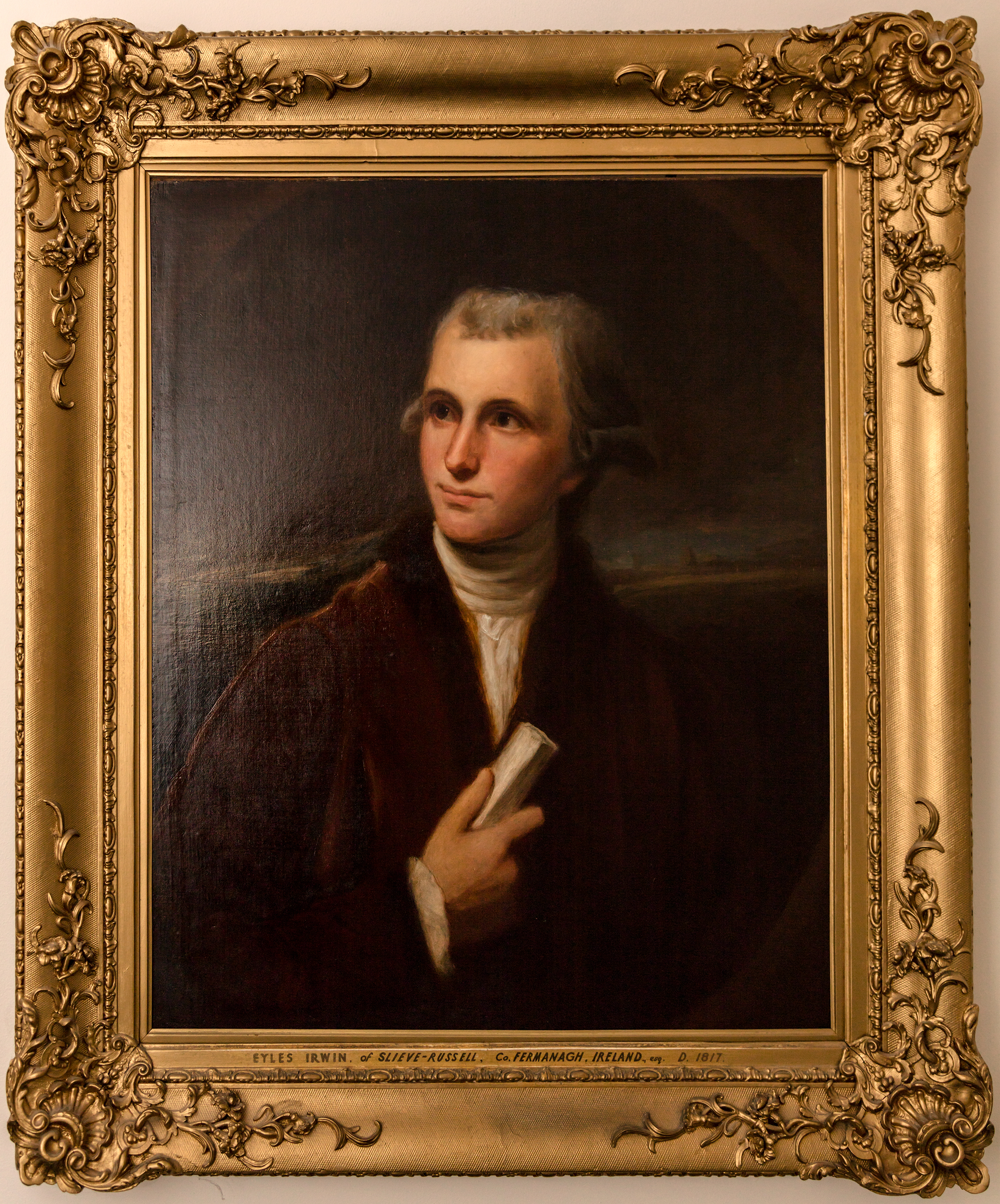
- Born: 1751; Kolkata
- Died: 12 August 1817 (aged 65–66); Clifton, Bristol, United Kingdom
- Occupation: Poet

Eyles Irwin (1751–1817) was an Irish poet and writer. He rose in the East India Company's service from a civil servant to superintendent of the company's affairs in China, but failed to gain a place on the board of directors.

He is notable for publishing several volumes of poems, primarily on historical subjects; elegies, odes, and epistles; and miscellaneous writings. Although not born in Ireland, he became a member of the Royal Irish Academy due to his Irish parents' roots.

== Biography ==
He was born at Calcutta (presently Kolkata) to Irish parents in 1751. His father was a native of Ireland who died in the service of East India Company. Irwin was educated at a private academy at Chiswick in England, and joined the East India Company in a civil capacity, serving at Madras (presently Chennai) in 1767. Due to his association with George Pigot, who was imprisoned and suspended, he too was suspended in 1775; consequently, he went back to England to lay his case before the board. His application was successful.

In 1778, he married Miss Brooke, who was related to Henry Brooke, the renowned Irish novelist and dramatist. In 1780, he was restored to his previous job and position by the Company at Madras. He returned to England in 1785 from Calcutta. During his time in China as superintendent of the Company's affairs in 1792, Irwin was noted for fostering improved trade relations. In 1795, he made one or two attempts to gain a place on the board of directors, but failed. Until he died on 12 August 1817, he busied himself with social and literary pursuits.

== Genealogy ==
Irwin's daughter was Frances Sally Irwin, a writer who published plays and poems. Frances Sally married Cmdr. Edwin Toby Caulfeild, son of Capt. Wade Toby Caulfeild and Lady Anne Cope of the Manor Catcombe, Wiltshire. Frances Sally and Edwin Toby's daughter, Sophia Frances Anne Caulfeild, was also a writer. Excerpt from a family tree scroll created circa mid 1800s.

"Pedigree of the Royal Descent of the Descendants of Wade T Caulfeild Esquire and Anne Cope his wife: The original name of Irvin, was Ereveine, Sieurs d' Avianches ( handwriting not clear), Normandy. The Descendants of old Viking Family. The Erevines emigrated to Scotland temp Wm The Conqueror.

The eldest son of Gov. Eyles Irwin, Maj James I. of the 5th Dragoon Gds, volunteered to serve in the American War 1812, led the Forlorn (??) "Hope" at Storming the Fort?? first on the scaling ladder & shot down.

The head of the family has been seated at Drum Castle, Highlands. N.B. for some 500 years to the present man spells his name "Irvine".

An ancestor was a staunch Cavalier & Charles 1st proposed to raise him to the Peerage; but he declined, saying that no-one should accuse him of serving his master for any reward. About 200 years ago two brothers of the family settled in the Co. Rosscommon & Fermanagh."

== Works ==
=== Poetry ===
- St. Thomas's Mount (1771).
- Bedukah, an Indian Pastoral (1776).
- Eastern Eclogues (1780).

==== Elegies ====
- Nilyus, an Elegy on the Victory of Admiral Nelson (1798).
- The Fall of Saragossa (1808).

==== Odes ====
- Ode on the Death of Ayder Ally (1784).
- Ode to Robert Brooke (1784).
- Triumph of Innocence, an Ode on the Deliverance of Maria Theresa Charlotte (1796).
- Ode to Iberia (1808).
- Ode on the Acquittal of Hastings.

=== Epistles ===
- Occasional Epistles (1783).
- Epistle to Hayley.

=== Miscellaneous ===
- A Series of Adventures in the Course of a Voyage Up the Red-Sea, on the Coasts of Arabia and Egypt, and of a Route through the Desarts of Thebais, hitherto Unknown to the European Traveller, in the Year M.DCC.LXXXVII. In Letters to a Lady. (1780).
- Inquiry into the Feasibility of the Supposed Expedition of Napoleon Bonaparte to the East (1796).
- Napoleon Bonaparte in Egypt (1798).
- The Failure of the French Crusade; or The Advantages to be Derived from the Restoration of Egypt to the Turks (1799).
- The Bedouins, or, Arabs of the Desert: A Comic Opera (1802).
- Napoleon; or The Vanity of Human Wishes (1814).
