= Johann Baptist Weder =

Swiss politician

Johann Baptist Weder (27 June 1800 in Oberriet – 17 October 1872) was a Swiss politician. He was President of the Swiss Council of States (1857) and President of the National Council (1860).

Preceded by François Briatte	President of the Council of States; 1857	Succeeded by August Stähelin-Brunner
Preceded by Friedrich Peyer im Hof	President of the National Council; 1860	Succeeded by Eduard Dapples
