= Thérèse de Dillmont =

Austrian artist, writer (1846–1890)

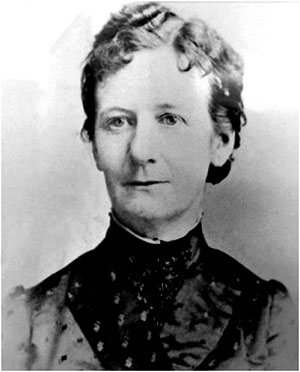
- portrait
- Born: 10 October 1846; Wiener Neustadt, Austria
- Died: 22 May 1890 (aged 43)
- Spouse: Joseph Scheuermann

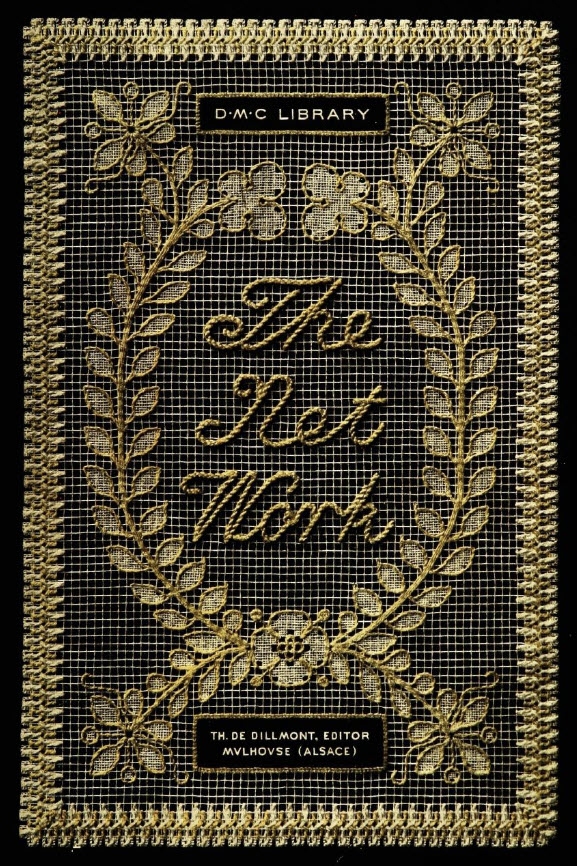
The cover of the book by Thérèse de Dillmont for DMC, about filet lace work, 1900

Thérèse de Dillmont (10 October 1846 – 22 May 1890) was an Austrian needleworker and writer. Dillmont's Encyclopedia of Needlework (1886) has been translated into 17 languages. She owned a string of shops in European capitals and she was "one of the most important pioneers in the international and multicultural enterprise of hobby needlework in the late nineteenth century".

== Life ==
Thérèse Maria Josepha de Dillmont was born in 1846 in Wiener Neustadt, the youngest of five children. Her mother was Franziska Schwendtenwein and her father, Ferdinand, was a professor of architecture at the Military Academy. Dillmont attended an embroidery school founded by the Empress Marie-Theresa. After her father died in 1857, Dillmont was brought up and educated in Vienna.

In 1884 Dillmont left the embroidery school that she had started with her sister Franziska and moved to France where she wrote her encyclopedia. Dillmont's book on needlework was published after Sophia Frances Anne Caulfeild and Blanche Catherine Saward's Dictionary of Needlework. Creators of these vast works were assisted by the copyright law which allowed authors to freely borrow material from periodicals. The book pulled together thousands of textile designs from many different countries including Egypt, Bulgaria, Turkey and China.

Dillmont commented on including instructions for hand sewing when machine sewing was much faster:

What is the use of describing all the old well-known stitches,
when machines have so nearly superseded the slower process of hand-sewing?

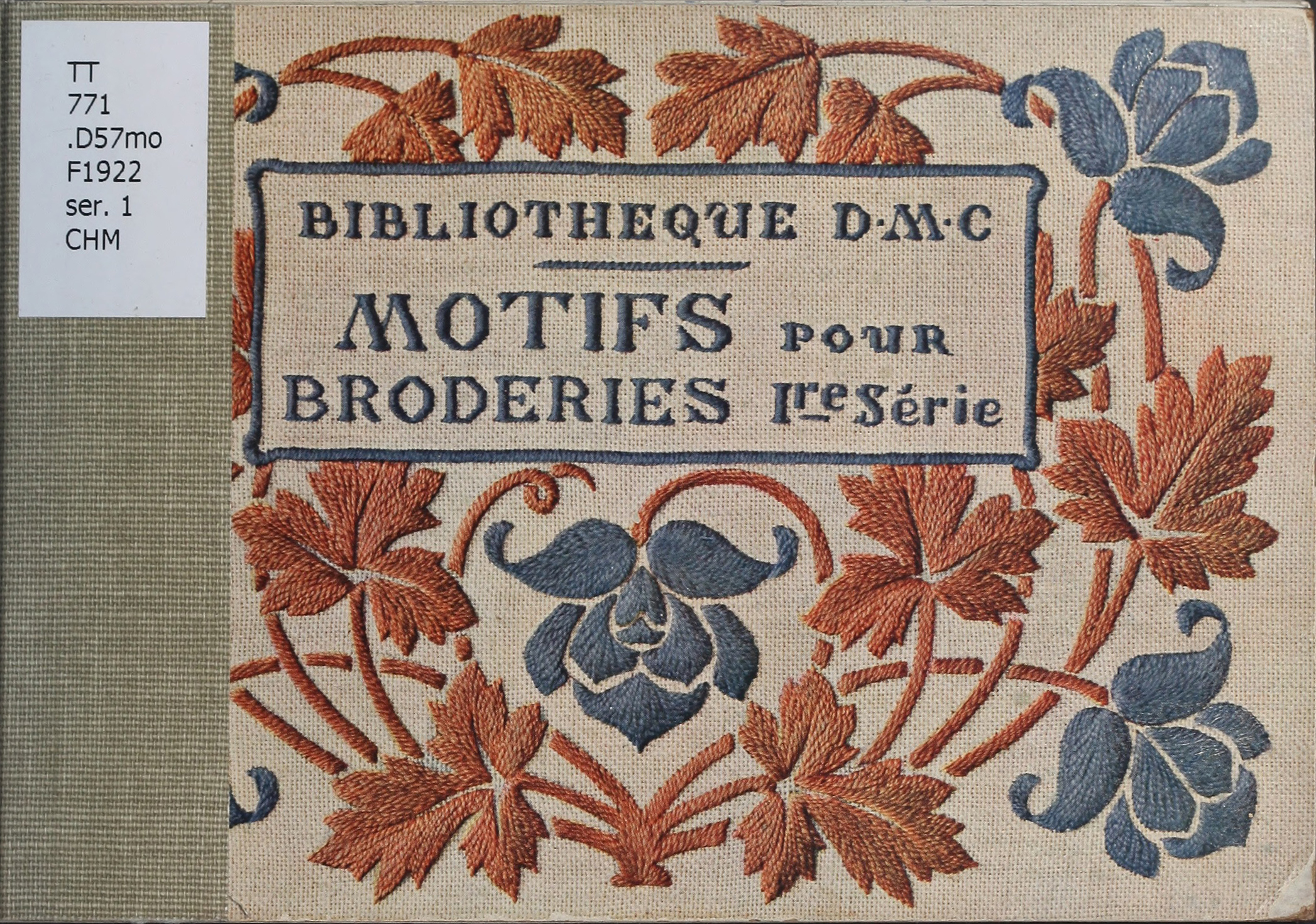
Cover of Motifs pour Broderies

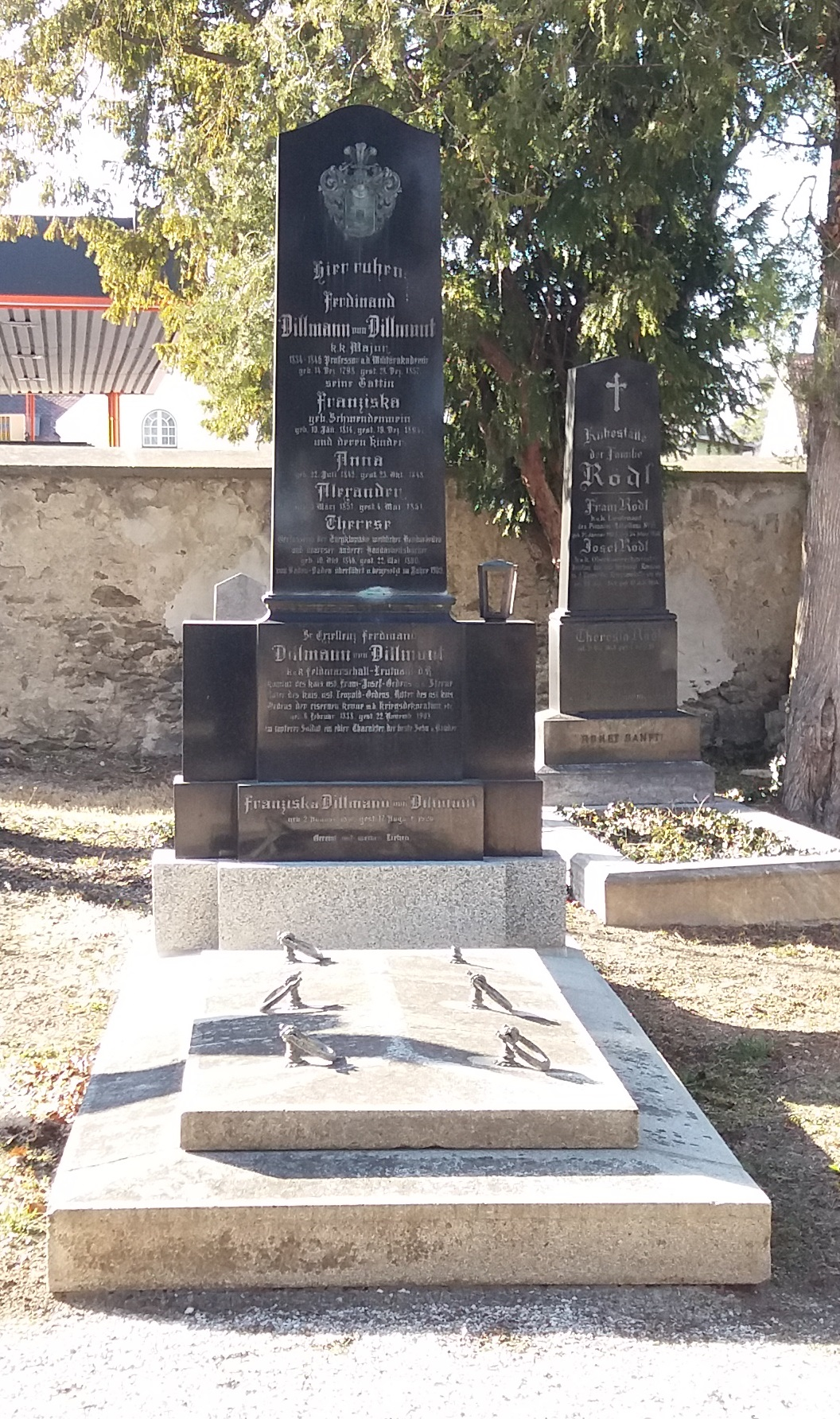
Her grave in Wiener Neustadt

She did however include a section on machine sewing. This work was aimed at the fashion for needlework and it competed with the Dictionary of Needlework and Weldon's Practical Needlework which was published in monthly parts from 1886. Dillmont's book was tied in with Dollfus-Mieg et Cie, a French thread company, and these products were recommended to her readers. In 1884 she had started working with the Alsatian-French textile firm (DMC) at Mulhouse after signing an agreement on 26 October 1884 with Jean Dollfus.

Dollfus was introducing new processes like mercerized cotton, and with Dillmont's help, DMC became known for its publications that stood out from previous books because they included clear instructions and illustrations for their designs. Dillmont's own textile school was at Dornach near Mulhouse, but Dillmont travelled widely as she had her own shops in Vienna, London, Paris and Berlin.

Dillmont died after just four months of marriage at the age of 43.

== Legacy ==
Dillmont's name was an asset to the DMC company and they continued to publish books under her name after her death. Over 100 books were attributed to Dillmont or her niece who was said to have an identical name. The books continued to be improved and iron-on transfers were included in her books in the twentieth century. In 2004 a translation of her encyclopedia into Russian was published. Her work is available in seventeen languages.

== Works include ==
- Encyclopédie des ouvrages de dames. Translated as Encyclopedia of Needlework, 1886.
- Album de broderies au point de croix, 3 vols., [c.1890]
- "Irish Crochet Lace" Mulhouse, Dollfus-Mieg & Cie, [c.1900]
- "Embroidery on net", 1900
