= Sophia Frances Anne Caulfeild =

British writer and needleworker

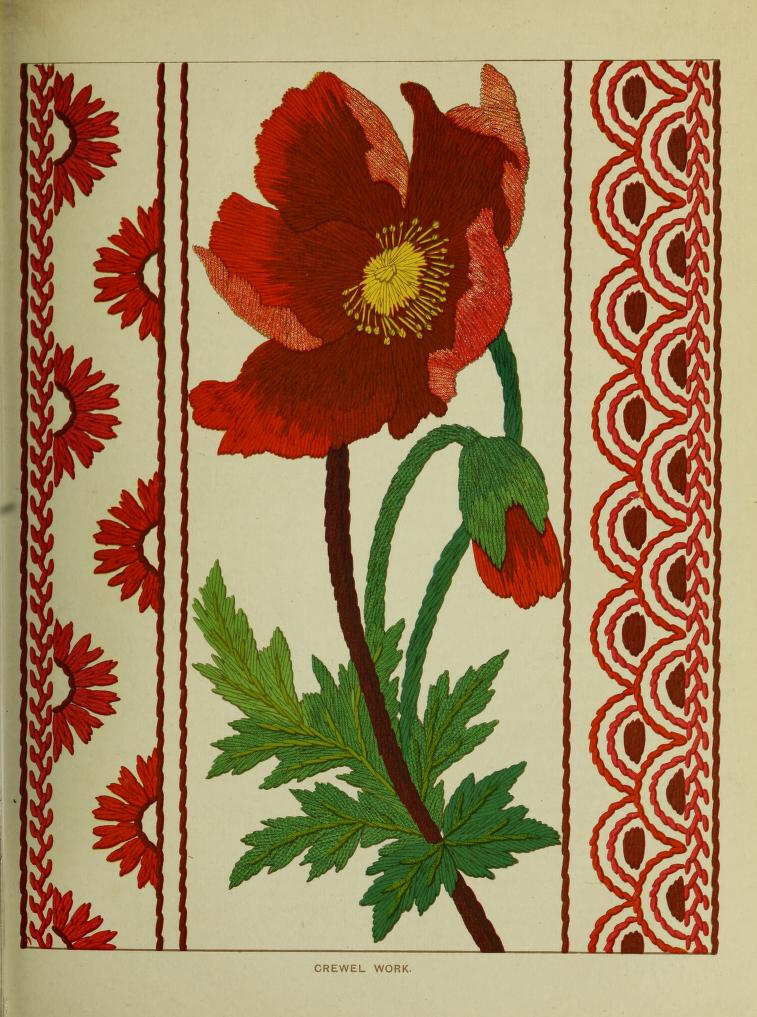
- an illustration from her book
- Born: 19 January 1824; Teignmouth
- Died: 20 November 1911 (aged 87); Kensington
- Writing career
- Subject: Needlework

Sophia Frances Anne Caulfeild (19 January 1824 – 20 November 1911) was a British writer and needleworker. She wrote about religion and needlework, and frequently worked with Blanche Catherine Saward.

== Life ==
Caulfeild was born in Teignmouth in 1824 to Frances Sally Irwin and Edwin-Toby Caulfeild, son of Wade-Toby Caulfeild. Her father was from a minor branch of a noble family. Her great-grandfather was William Caulfeild, 2nd Viscount Charlemont. Her grandfather on her mother's side was the Irish poet, Eyles Irwin. She had a younger sister called Louisa Lavinia and an elder brother named Henry Cope Caulfeild. Caulfield lived in Teignmouth.

In 1870 she had a book of poetry published which she dedicated to her brother Henry Cope Caulfeild.

In 1882 she and Blanche Saward had their Dictionary of Needlework published. The work was available in six volumes and the full title was The dictionary of needlework : an encyclopaedia of artistic, plain, and fancy needlework dealing fully with the details of all the stitches employed, the method of working, the materials used, the meaning of technical terms, and, where necessary, tracing the origin and history of the various works described. In 1887 she published The Lives of the Apostles, their contemporaries and successors.

Their "bible" has been described as an encyclopedia having 800 woodcut illustrations and over 528 pages. The subjects were presented in alphabetic orders and the work attempted to describe all aspects of needlework. The section on embroidery alone ran to 24 pages. This work was aimed at the fashion for needlework and it competed with Thérèse de Dillmont's Complete Encyclopedia of Needlework published in 1884 and Weldon's Practical Needlework which was published in monthly parts from 1886. Writers of these vast works were assisted by the copyright law which allowed writers to freely borrow material from periodicals.

Caulfeild died in Kensington in 1911.

== Works ==
- The Dictionary of Needlework (with Blanche C. Saward)
- Encyclopedia of Victorian Needlework, Vol. II
- Encyclopedia of Victorian Needlework, Vol. I
- The Lives of the Apostles, their contemporaries and successors
- True philosophy : a reply to certain statements made in "Scientific
- The dawn of Christianity in Continental Europe and the planting of the…
- Desmond and other poems
