= Carl Koechlin (politician) =

Swiss politician (1856–1914)

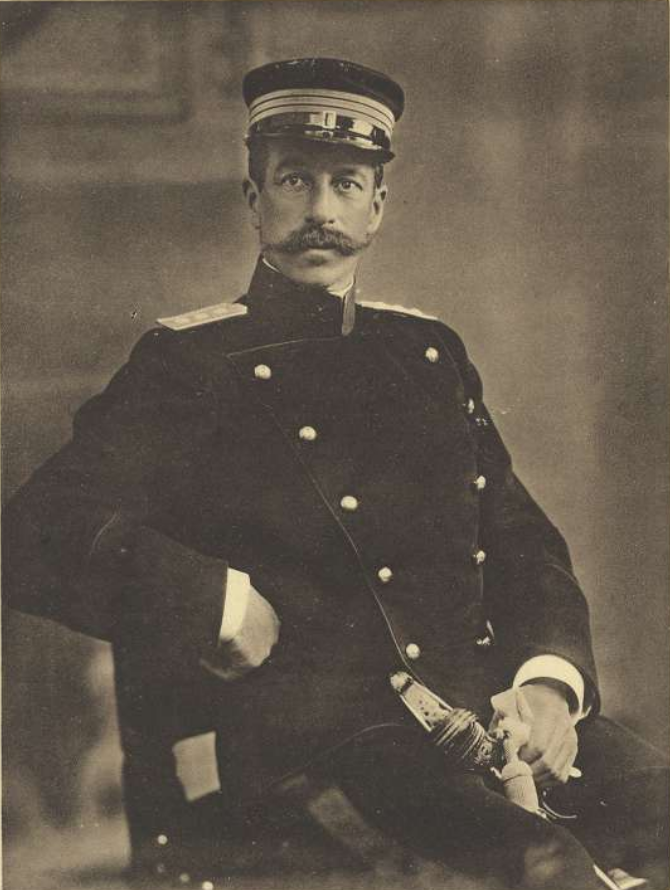
- Koechlin between 1899 and 1905
- Born: 5 November 1856; Basel, Switzerland
- Died: 2 February 1914 (aged 57); Basel, Switzerland
- Occupations: Politician; businessman; army officer
- Spouse: Elisabeth Iselin (m. 1884)

Carl Koechlin (5 November 1856 – 2 February 1914), also known as Carl Koechlin-Iselin, was a Swiss politician, businessman and army officer. He was a partner in the chemical factory of his uncle Johann Rudolf Geigy, sat in the National Council from 1897 to 1902 and presided over the Basel Chamber of Commerce from 1906 to 1913. From 1905 to 1908 he commanded the 2nd Division of the Swiss Army.

== Biography ==
Carl Koechlin was born in Basel into the Koechlin family. He was the son of Alphons Koechlin and a grandson of Karl Geigy. After a commercial apprenticeship he joined the chemical factory of his uncle Johann Rudolf Geigy in 1883, where he soon became commercial manager and a partner. After the firm was converted into a joint-stock company in 1901, he sat on its board of directors. In 1884 he married Elisabeth Iselin. His sons were Alphons and Carl.

From 1897 to 1902 Koechlin was a Liberal-Democratic member of the National Council. He took part in drafting the National Bank Act and in introducing the postal check service. He was a member of the Basel Chamber of Commerce (Basler Handelskammer) from 1898 to 1913 and its president from 1906. He sat on the boards of directors of the Swiss Central Railway from 1893 to 1895, the Swiss Federal Railways from 1904 to 1913 and the Swiss National Bank from 1906 to 1907.

Koechlin also held numerous public and charitable offices. He was a member of the civil court of Basel from 1893 to 1900 and head of the city's public welfare society (Gemeinnützige Gesellschaft) from 1896 to 1897. He was active in the Protestant social workers' association (Evangelisch-sozialer Arbeiterverein), which he had co-founded. From 1905 to 1908 he was an Oberstdivisionär (divisional colonel) in command of the 2nd Division. He died in Basel on 2 February 1914.

== Bibliography ==
- Schweizerische Blätter für Handel und Industrie, 1914, no. 4, 61–63
- E. Gruner (ed.), Die schweizerische Bundesversammlung 1848–1920, vol. 1, 1966, 455–456
- D. Königs, Carl Koechlin (1856–1914), 2003
- Vischer, Wilhelm: "Carl Koechlin-Iselin. 1856–1914", in: Basler Jahrbuch, 1915, pp. 1–30.

=== Archives ===
- Personal papers, Staatsarchiv Basel-Stadt, Basel
