= Gertrud Spiess =

Swiss politician

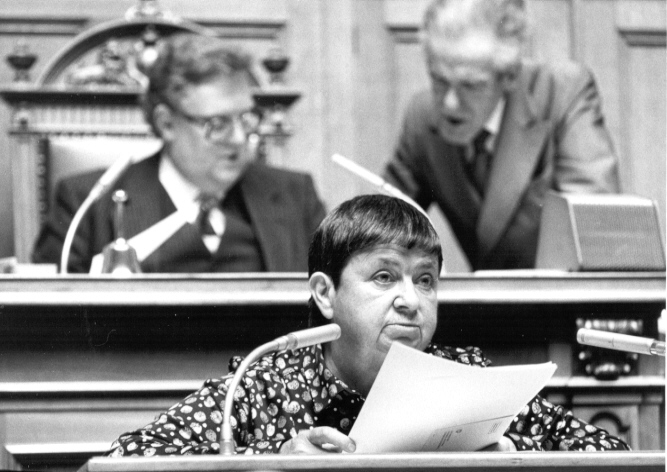
Gertrud Spiess at the speaker's desk in the National Council.

Gertrud Spiess (16 April 1914 in Basel – 14 July 1995 in Basel) was a Swiss politician of the Christian Democratic People's Party. She was a member of the National Council from 1975 to 1983.

== Life ==
Spiess was born in Basel to a mechanic. She studied philology, German and history in Basel and Kiel. Then she made Islamic studies in Basel and Cairo, Egypt and earned a doctor's degree in 1946 with her thesis Maḥmūd von Ġazna bei Farīdu’d-dīn ʿAṭṭār which was first published in print in 1959. Spiess was a high school teacher of Latin and Ancient Greek.

Her life was shaped by her political commitment. She sat in the Citizens' Council of Basel, campaigned for women's suffrage in Switzerland, and joined the Grand Council of Basel in 1968. She became the first female Statthalter of the city of Basel in 1974, and the first female speaker of the Grand Council of the canton of Basel-Stadt. Moreover, she was a member of the National Council from 1975 to 1983. Her fields of interest included social and education policy.

Spiess was single.

== See also ==
- List of members of the Federal Assembly from the Canton of Basel-Stadt
