= Anita Fetz =

Swiss politician and entrepreneur (born 1957)

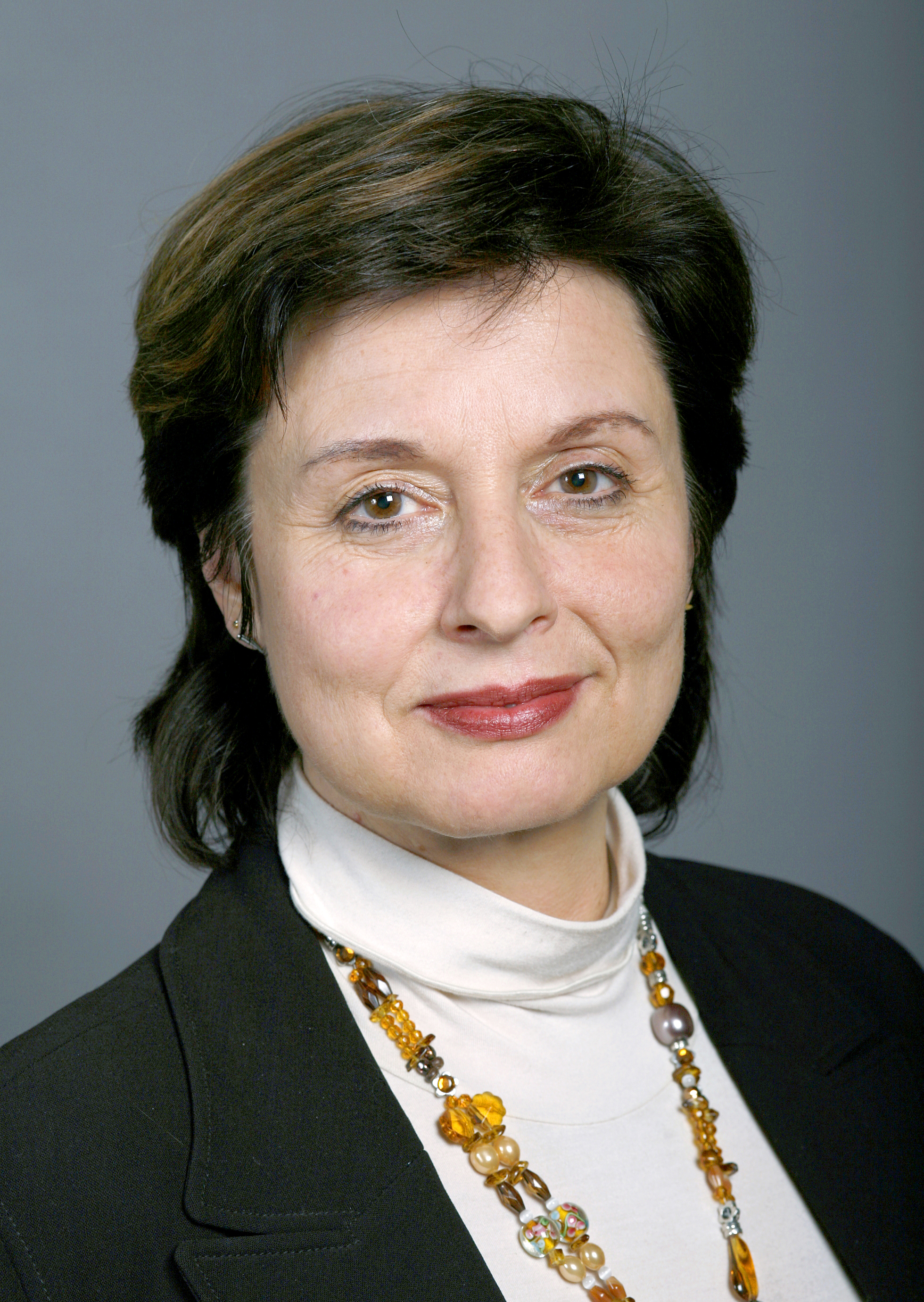

Member of the National Council of Switzerland
- In office 1985–1990
- Constituency: Basel
- In office 1997–2003
- Constituency: Basel

Member of the Council of States of Switzerland
- In office 2003–2019

Personal details
- Born: Anita Fetz; 19 March 1957 (age 69) Basel, Switzerland
- Party: Social Democratic Party of Switzerland

Anita Fetz (born 19 March 1957) is a Swiss politician of the Social Democratic Party of Switzerland (SP) and a former member of the National Council and the Council of States in Switzerland.

== Early life and education ==
After graduating from the Gymnasium in Münchenstein, Basel Landschaft, Fetz studied history at the Universities of Basel and Berlin and works as an independent management consultant. In 1986 she founded the company femmedia which supports the personal development process in companies.

== Professional career ==
She was a founding member of the Alternative Bank in Switzerland and between 1990 until 1997 a member of its board of directors. She was also a member of the Bank Council of the Basler Kantonalbank and of the board of directors of the Bank Cler. She is also currently the owner of femmedia. In 2019 she became a member of the board of directors of the Swiss Central Real Estate.

== Political career ==
As a member of the Progressive Organizations of Switzerland (POCH), she was a member of the Grand Council of Basel-Stadt between 1984 and 1989 and of the National Council from 1985 until 1990. In 1995 she joined the SP and was again a member of the Grand Council from 1997 to 2004 and a member of the National Council for the SP between 1999 and 2003. From 2003 onwards until 2019, she was a member of the Council of States for the Canton of Basel-Stadt. In February 2012, Fetz was elected together with Roger Nordmann as Vice President of the SP parliamentary group in the Federal Assembly. In 2019 she was succeeded by Eva Herzog in the Council of States.

== Works ==
- My Baasel

== Personal life ==
Anita Fetz lives in a partnership and has her place of origin in Basel, Domat, Ems in Grisons and Gelterkinden in Basel-Landschaft. She formulated her own ten commandments for women, and with her dressing style she created some controversies at the time as in high school she was against the ban on trousers for young women, and in parliament she appeared with a T-shirt.
