= Koechlin Island =

Island in Antarctica

- Location within Antarctica

Geography
- Location: Antarctica
- Coordinates: 66°42′S 67°38′W

Administration
- Administered under the Antarctic Treaty System

Demographics
- Population: Uninhabited

Koechlin Island is an island off the northeast coast of Adelaide Island, Antarctica, about 8 kilometres (4.5 nmi) south of the Sillard Islands. It was mapped from air photos taken by the Ronne Antarctic Research Expedition (1947–48) and the Falkland Islands and Dependencies Aerial Survey Expedition (1956–57). The island was named by the UK Antarctic Place-Names Committee for Swiss glaciologist René Koechlin, author of Les glaciers et leur mechanisme, 1944.

== See also ==
- List of Antarctic and sub-Antarctic islands
