= Rudolf Koechlin =

Austrian mineralogist

Rudolf Koechlin (11 November 1862 – 11 February 1939) was an Austrian mineralogist.

Koechlin was born and died in Vienna. He studied mineralogy, crystallography, petrology and geology at the University of Vienna, obtaining his doctorate in 1887 with a thesis on manganite, polianite and pyrolusite. At Vienna, his instructors included Gustav Tschermak and Albrecht Schrauf. In 1884 he began work as a volunteer in the mineralogical-petrography department of the Naturhistorisches Hofmuseum in Vienna. In 1897 he became a "custos-adjunct", later named a curator first-class (1912), and in 1920, was appointed director of the mineralogical-petrography department.

His scientific research largely dealt with minerals found in the Tauern region in Austria, e.g. bornite, euclase and sphene as well as the salt minerals glauberite and simonyite from the salt mine at Hallstatt. The mineral koechlinite is named in his honor.

He was the author of around 70 scientific papers and made important contributions towards publication of the "Mineralogisches Taschenbuch" (first edition, 1911). From 1910 to 1932, he was a staff member of the Wiener Mineralogische Gesellschaft. In 1922, he became a correspondent member of the Austrian Academy of Sciences.
