= August Stähelin =

Swiss politician

August Stähelin (16 September 1812 – 28 September 1886) was a Swiss politician and President of the Swiss Council of States (1857/1858).

Preceded by Johann Baptist Weder	President of the Council of States; 1857/1858	Succeeded by Niklaus Niggeler
