= Niklaus Niggeler =

Swiss politician (1817–1872)

Niklaus Niggeler (3 May 1817 in Grossaffoltern – 26 May 1872) was a Swiss politician from the canton of Bern. He was President of the Swiss Council of States (1858/59) and of the National Council (1866).

Preceded by August Stähelin-Brunner	President of the Council of States; 1858/59	Succeeded by François Briatte
Preceded by Andreas Rudolf von Planta	President of the National Council; 1866	Succeeded by Jules Philippin
