= Karl Geigy (politician) =

Swiss businessman and politician

- Engraving by Friedrich Weber after a painting, 1861
- Born: 11 June 1798; Basel, Helvetic Republic
- Died: 27 January 1861 (aged 62); Basel, Switzerland
- Occupations: Merchant; politician
- Spouses: Sophie Preiswerk (m. 1824) Susette Buxtorf (m. 1847)
- Children: Johann Rudolf Geigy-Merian
- Parents: Hieronymus Geigy (father); Charlotte Sarasin (mother)

Karl Geigy (11 June 1798 – 27 January 1861) was a Swiss merchant and politician from Basel. A partner in the family firm J. R. Geigy from 1824, he co-founded the Giro- und Depositenbank and the Kreditverein in Basel and was a member of the Small Council, the cantonal government, from 1847 to 1858. In 1853 he co-founded the Swiss Central Railway, chaired its board of directors and from 1856 to 1860 presided over its directorate.

== Biography ==
Karl Geigy was born in Basel, the son of Hieronymus Geigy, a merchant and owner of the firm J. R. Geigy, and Charlotte Sarasin. In 1824 he married Sophie Preiswerk, daughter of Dietrich Preiswerk, a silk ribbon manufacturer, and in 1847 Susette Buxtorf, daughter of Andreas Buxtorf, also a silk ribbon manufacturer. His son was Johann Rudolf Geigy-Merian.

After attending the grammar school (Gymnasium) and the institute of Christoph Bernoulli, Geigy began an apprenticeship in his father's firm in 1813, which he continued in 1817–1818 at a trading house in Marseille. He became an authorized signatory (Prokurist) of J. R. Geigy in 1819 and a partner in 1824. From 1840, together with Leonhard Bernoulli, he sold drugs and pharmaceuticals under the name Geigy & Bernoulli, while J. R. Geigy processed dyewoods and traded in dyestuffs.

In 1843/1844 Geigy co-founded the Giro- und Depositenbank in Basel, and from 1848 to 1854 he sat on its board. In 1848 he and Johann Jakob Speiser also founded the Kreditverein. In 1845 he was elected to the Grand Council, where he belonged to the conservative majority. From 1847 to 1858 he was also a member of the Small Council (Kleiner Rat). He presided over the Ohmgeld chamber (Ohmgeldkammer), the customs commission (Kaufhauskommission) and the finance board (Finanzkollegium), and he took part in founding the municipal theater (Stadttheater) and the Casino. In 1847 he worked on the revision of the constitution on the side of the party of movement (Bewegungspartei). Because of illness he was often unable to attend to council business. He left the government in 1858 but continued to preside over the customs commission and the Ohmgeld chamber for two more years.

The Federal Council called on Geigy several times as an expert on railway questions; he recognized early how important a well-developed rail network was for Switzerland. As early as 1843 his firm had been one of the applicants for the concession to build and operate the section from Saint-Louis to Basel, which completed the Strasbourg–Basel line. In 1853, together with Achilles Bischoff and Speiser, he founded the Swiss Central Railway and chaired its board of directors. In 1854, together with Speiser, he led the company out of its financial crisis through an agreement with Isaac Pereire and the Crédit Mobilier. After Speiser's death, Geigy was president of the directorate from 1856 to 1860. During his term, continuous connections were built from Basel to Zurich, completed by 1858 with the lines Basel–Olten, Olten–Aarau and Aarau–Baden, and to Lucerne (1859). In 1857 Geigy's negotiations in Paris to merge the Central Railway with the Northeastern Railway and the Western Railway failed. Geigy regarded the railways as public-benefit institutions. His restless commitment to the new means of transport, which drove him to his physical limits, was marked by great expertise. He died in Basel on 27 January 1861.

== Bibliography ==
- A. Bürgin, Geschichte des Geigy-Unternehmens von 1758 bis 1939, 1958
- G. A. Wanner, "Karl Geigy", in Schweizer Pioniere der Wirtschaft und Technik, 18, 1967, 47–71

=== Archives ===
- Staatsarchiv Basel-Stadt, Basel (papers)
