= Emil Arnold =

Swiss politician (1897–1974)

Emil Arnold (1897–1974) was a Swiss politician. He was an active participant in the 1918 bank sector strike and the 1918 Swiss general strike. He was a member of the Communist International executive as of 1921. He became a member of the Grand Council of Basel-Stadt in 1926. He was a member of the National Council in 1932. He was a founding member of the Swiss Party of Labour in 1944. In 1951 he again served as a member of the National Council.
