= Koechlin family =

Alsatian mercantile family

Koechlin family Köchlin, Köchli
- Business family
- Current region: France, Switzerland
- Origin: Stein am Rhein, Switzerland
- Website: Official website (in French)

The Koechlin family (French pronunciation: [kœʃ.lɛ̃]; German pronunciation: [ˈkøːç.lɪn]; originally also spelled Köchlin and Köchli) is a French Alsatian family of Swiss origin originally hailing from Stein am Rhein near Schaffhausen. They expanded over several generations via Zurich and emigrated to Mulhouse where they acquired substantial wealth in the textile industry and held several public offices as politicians, military officers and judges.

In 1782, the formerly Swiss family, emigrated to Switzerland and took Swiss citizenship in Basel. There they became members of the social upper class as well, mostly through marrying into families of the Daig (Switzerland). Through these alliances with families such as the Merian family, Burckhardt family and Geigy family they became industrialists, clergy and politicians. Most notably they were involved in J.R. Geigy (presently Novartis) and responsible to turning the firm into a global concern. In 1874 and 1886, a second and third line of the Alsatian Koechlin families, became citizens in Basel.

The original Schaffhausen and Zürich lines of the family are almost extinct.

== Early family history ==
The first traces of the family can be found in 1440, when Johann Koechlin moved from Stein am Rhein to Zurich, both in Switzerland. His grandson Hartmann Koechlin (1572–1611) was the first of the Koechlins to move to Mulhouse, then called Mülhausen.

== Alsatian line ==
=== Family tree ===
- Samuel Koechlin (1719–1776), cofounder of the textile industry in Mulhouse in 1746 — m. Elisabeth Hofer (1725–1793)
  - Johann Koechlin (1746–1836), trader and industrialist in Mulhouse — m. Climène Dollfus (1753–1828)
    - Jean-Jacques Koechlin (1776–1834), mayor of Mulhouse during the Cent-Jours; then deputy from 1819 to 1820
    - Rodolphe Koechlin (1778–1855), industrialist in Mulhouse — m. Elisabeth Risler (1778–1829)
      - Jean Koechlin (1801–1870), manufacturer in Mulhouse — m. Marie Madeleine Elisabeth Dollfus (1806–1891), sister of Jean and Émile Dollfus
        - Alfred Koechlin-Schwartz (1829–1895), manufacturer, deputy for Nord — m. Emma Schwartz
          - Raymond Koechlin (1860–1931), journalist and art collector
      - Émile Koechlin (1808–1883), mayor of Mulhouse between 1848 and 1852 — m. Salomé Koechling (1817–1891), great-granddaughter of Samuel Koechlin
        - Émilie Koechlin (1837–1871) — m. Charles Friedel, chemist
        - Rodolphe Koechlin (1847–1920), Knight in the Legion of Honour
    - Nicolas Koechlin (1781–1852), industrialist in Mulhouse, deputy, creator of the first train line in Alsace
    - Daniel Koechlin (1785–1871), manufacturer and chemist in Mulhouse — m. Émilie Schouch (1787–1852)
      - Camille Jules Koechlin (1811–1990), chemist
      - Georges Michel Koechlin, known as Jules Koechlin (1816–1882), manufacturer in Mulhouse and Paris — m. Camille Dollfus (1826–?), daughter of Jean Dollfus and niece of Émile Dollfus
        - Charles Koechlin (1867–1950), composer
      - Alfred Koechlin-Steinbach (1825–1872), deputy in 1871
    - Ferdinand Koechlin (1786–1854), industrialist in Mulhouse, Aide-de-camp of François Joseph Lefebvre — m. Amélie Hofer (1804–1895)
      - Jules "Ferdinand" Koechlin (1822–1890), cotton commissionary — m. Caroline Dollfus (1828–1888), daughter of Jean Dollfus
        - Gabrielle Anna Koechlin (1858–1890) — m. Gabriel Alexis Bouffet (1850–1910), prefect, Councillor of State
          - Jean Gabriel Ferdinand Bouffet (1882–1940), Général de corps d'armée — m. Anne Louise Laffon de Ladebat (1886–1971), daughter of General Etienne Laffon de Ladebat, Chief of the Defence Staff
          - Andrée Isabelle Suzanne Bouffet (1884–1965) — m. Jacques Édouard Guerlain (1874–1963), industrialist, perfume creator for Guerlain between 1890 and 1955
  - Jean-Jacques Koechlin (1754–1814), known as "Koechlin-à-la-pipe", medical doctor and plenipotentiary of the Republic of Mulhouse — m. Anne-Catherine Dollfus (1760–1812), daughter of Jean-Henri Dollfus, sister of Jean-Henri Dollfus fils and great-granddaughter of Jean Bernoulli
    - Jean Koechlin (1780–1862), industrialist in Mulhouse, later in Guebwiller — m. Elise Witz (1794–1855)
      - Jean-Frédéric Koechlin (1826–1914), manufacturer in Buhl, Haut-Rhin — m. Anaïs Beuck (1834–1889)
        - Maurice Koechlin (1856–1946), engineer, structural designer of the Eiffel Tower
          - Joel Koechlin — m. Françoise Armandie
            - Kalki Koechlin (born 1984), actress, screenwriter in the Indian film industry
        - René Koechlin (1866–1951), engineer
    - André Koechlin (1789–1875), industrialist, mayor of Mulhouse between 1830 and 1843, deputy
    - Joseph Koechlin (1790–1851)
      - Jean-Jacques Koechlin (1817–1869)
        - Albert Koechlin (1848–1920)
          - Paul Koechlin (1881–1916), aviation pioneer, created his first plane in 1908
        - Paul Koechlin (1852–1907), automobile racer, winner of the Paris–Bordeaux–Paris race, the first automobile race ever
    - Fritz Koechlin, industrialist in Alsace
  - Josué Koechlin (1756–1830), trader, mayor of Mulhouse between 1811 and 1814 — m. Anne-Catherine Mieg (1768–1822)
    - Charles Émile Koechlin, known as Joseph Koechlin-Schlumberger (1796–1863), manufacturer, mayor of Mulhouse between 1852 and 1863 — m. Caroline Schlumberger (1810–1900)
      - Caroline Koechlin (1829–1903) — m. Jean Mieg, known as Jean Mieg-Koechlin (1819–1904), mayor of Mulhouse between 1872 and 1887

== Samuel Koechlin line ==
- Samuel Koechlin (1719–1776) was a French industrialist who in 1745, together with Jean-Henri Dollfus and Jean-Jacques Schmaltzer, started a cloth printing firm in Mulhouse. Dollfus left the company in 1765 to start his own firm. Christophe-Philippe Oberkampf was an engraver in the firm of Samuel Koechlin.
- Josué Koechlin (1756–1830) was a son of Samuel, and the father of Joseph Koechlin-Schlumberger. He was the first of six Koechlins to become mayor of Mulhouse, from 1811 to 1814.
- André Koechlin (1789–1875) was a grandson of Samuel Koechlin and the son-in-law of Daniel Dollfus-Mieg, head of the Dollfus-Mieg textile company. Under his lead, between 1818 and 1826, the company became the leading textile company of Mulhouse. Turning in 1826 to the building of machinery for the textile industry, Koechlin became knowledgeable in the fabrication of steam machines and started making railroad equipment. The firm prospered and in 1839 already employed 1,800 people. By 1842, they were the largest French locomotive maker, having built 22 of them by then. This rose rapidly, and in 1857 alone, they made 91 locomotives. They stayed one of the six large French locomotive constructors until the merger with Elsässische Maschinenbau-Gesellschaft Grafenstaden in 1872, when the company became Société Alsacienne de Constructions Mécaniques. André Koechlin was mayor of Mulhouse from 1830 until 1843, and was elected a deputy in 1830, 1831, 1841 and 1846. He became a Knight in the Legion of Honour in 1836.
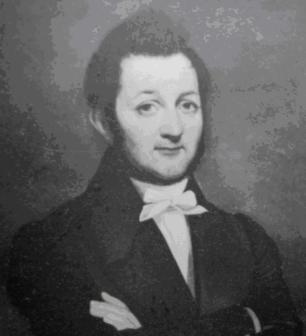
  Portrait of André Koechlin by Claude-Marie Dubufe
- Fritz Auguste Koechlin (born 1799) was the younger brother of André. He was responsible for a number of cotton mills, and owned large cotton plantations in Senegal.
- Jacques Koechlin (1776–1834) colloquially also Jean-Jacques Koechlin was mayor of Mulhouse in 1815 and between 1819 and 1821, and a deputy of France for Haut-Rhin. He was mayor of Mulhouse until October 1820, and was reelected as a Deputy in November 1820. He was one of the leaders of the opposition. He published a pamphlet against some French officials governing Alsace, which was reprinted in a number of newspapers. The newspapers were convicted for printing this, but Koechlin was only taken to trial in 1823. He published a second pamphlet explaining why he refused to appear before the court. He was convicted in May, and on appeal in July, to six months imprisonment for writing and publishing the first pamphlet.
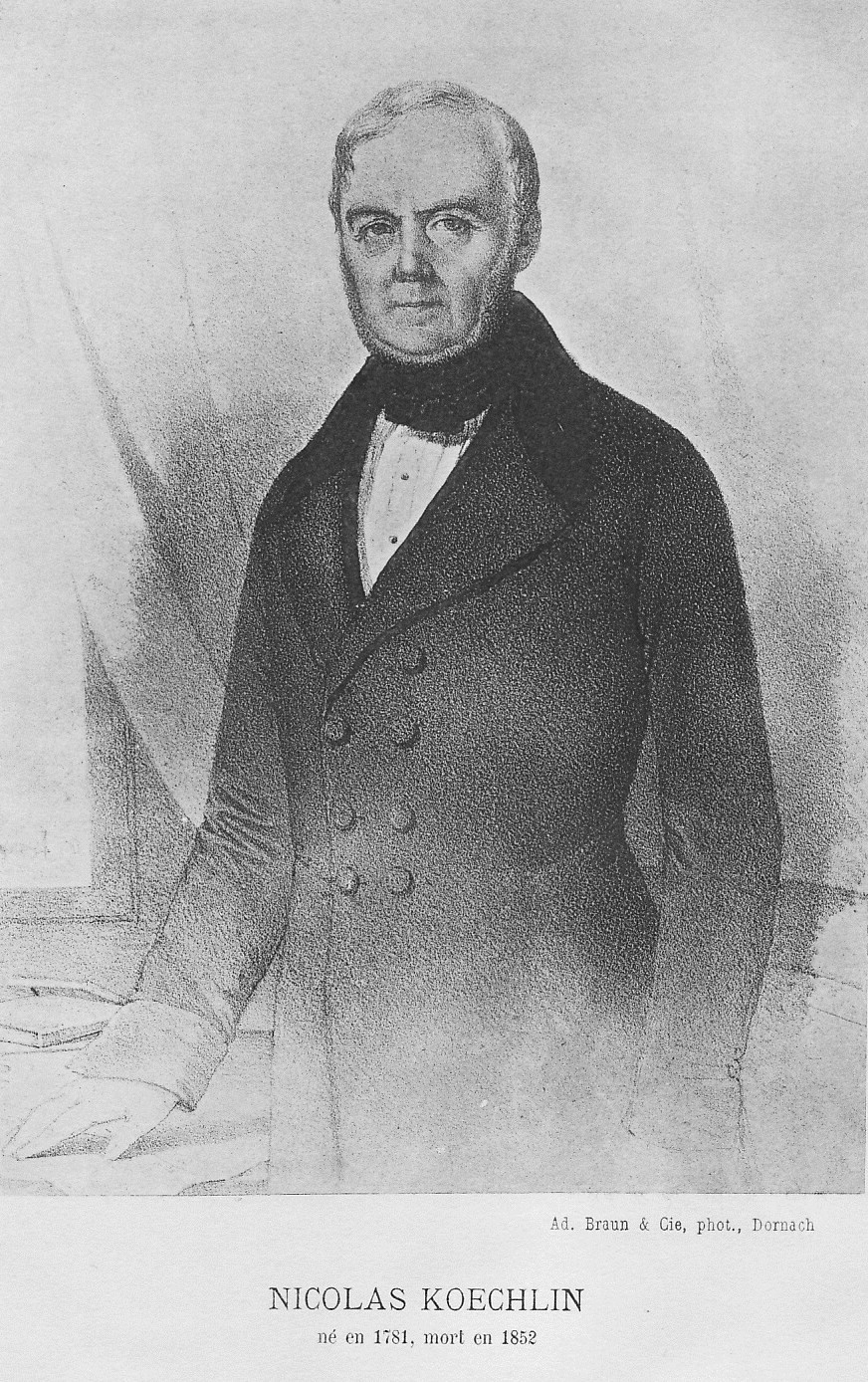
- Portrait of Nicholas Koechlin
  Nicolas Koechlin (1781–1852) was a brother of Jacques Koechlin and a grandson of Samuel Koechlin. He created the company Nicolas Koechlin et Frères, which branched out of the textile industry. He was instrumental in promoting the installation of railway lines in Alsace, with the Strasbourg-Basel line and the Mulhouse-Thann line in the 1830s. He was the head of the Mulhouse chamber of commerce from 1828 until 1835. During the Hundred Days he organised a group of Partisans, and became a Knight in the Legion of Honour in 1814. He was a deputy from 1830 until 1837.
- Daniel Koechlin or Daniel Koechlin-Schouch (1785–1871) was a younger brother of Nicholas Koechlin. He was a chemist and inventor, and received the Legion of Honour for his work in the field. He studied from 1800 until 1802 under Antoine François, comte de Fourcroy. He was most notable for his inventions related to the dyeing of cotton.
- Joseph Koechlin-Schlumberger (1796–1863) was a grandson of Samuel Koechlin. He was mayor of Mulhouse from 1852 until 1863.
- Émile Koechlin (1808–1883) was a great-grandson of Samuel Koechlin. He was mayor of Mulhouse from 1848 until 1852.
- Jean Mieg-Koechlin (1819–1904) was the son-in-law of Joseph Koechlin-Schlumberger. He was mayor of Mulhouse between 1872 and 1887.
- Alfred Koechlin-Steinbach (1825–1872), son of Daniel Koechlin-Schouch and uncle of the composer Charles Koechlin, was a deputy for Haut-Rhin for a short while in 1871.
- Alfred Koechlin-Schwartz (1829–1895) was a deputy for the region Nord.

== Rodolphe Koechlin line ==
- Rodolphe Koechlin (1847–1920) was a great-grandson of Nicolas Koechlin. Captain in the French Army, he became a Knight in the Legion of Honour and received the Médaille commémorative de la guerre 1870–1871. After his retirement he moved to Bénodet in Brittany, where he became known for his philanthropy, and a street was named after him after his death.
- Georges Koechlin (1872–1955), the eldest son of Rodoplhe Koechlin, was a military officer like his father. He also became a Knight in the Legion of Honour and received the Croix de guerre with Silver Star.
- Rodolphe Émile Koechlin (1874–1916) was the second son of Rodolphe Koechlin. He served in the French army as well, and became a Commander of the Legion of Honour, received the Croix de Guerre with Bronze Star and other war medals. His son, Robert Rodolphe Koechlin (1916–1971) also was a Commander of the Legion of Honour.
- Paul Koechlin (1852–1907) was the winner of one of the earliest automobile races in the world, the 1895 Paris–Bordeaux–Paris race. Despite arriving third in his Peugeot, eleven hours after the first racer, he was declared the winner and received the 31.500 francs prize money since he drove the first four seater to arrive, as stipulated in the rules.
- Maurice Koechlin (1856–1946) was a first cousin once removed of André Koechlin. He was an engineer who worked closely together with Gustave Eiffel. He was an officer in the Legion of Honour. One of his descendants is Kalki Koechlin, an award-winning French actress based in India.

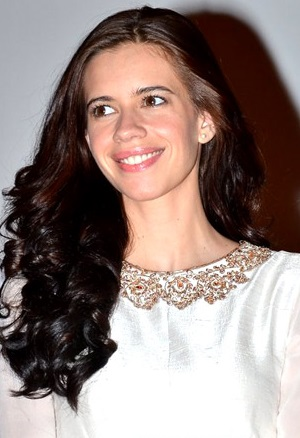
Koechlin in 2014

- Kalki Koechlin (born 1984) is an Indian-born French actress. She has received two of India's highest-ranking awards in film, the National Film Award and the Filmfare Award from three nominations. Koechlin has established herself as one of the most popular actresses of India, through her performances in the critically and commercially successful films, including Dev.D (2009), Shanghai (2012), Zindagi Na Milegi Dobara (2011), Shaitan (2012), That Girl in Yellow Boots (2011), Yeh Jawaani Hai Deewani (2013), Ek Thi Daayan (2013), Margarita with a Straw (2015) and Waiting (2016). Koechlin is the descendant of the French engineer, Maurice Koechlin.
- Raymond Koechlin (1860–1931), son of Alfred Koechlin-Schwartz, was a journalist and art collector. He owned works by Eugène Delacroix, Vincent van Gogh, Claude Monet, Edgar Degas, Auguste Renoir, Jean-Baptiste-Camille Corot and Édouard Manet, next to large collections of Oriental, Islamic, and medieval art, and was a benefactor of the Louvre Museum, a.o. as creator and director of the Friends of the Louvre, and as director of the Musée des Arts Décoratifs, Paris. He was director of the Réunion des Musées Nationaux from 1922 until 1931. Apart from his connections with artists like Auguste Rodin, he was a longtime friend of the art dealer Samuel Bing and American historian Royall Tyler and also befriended other Americans like Edith Wharton and French writers like Marcel Proust. He wrote among other works 3 volumes about French Gothic ivories (1924) and a memoir, Souvenirs d'un vieil amateur d'art de l'Extrême-Orient in 1930. His bequest to the Louvre in 1932 included amongst many other pieces the Peacock dish, the "most famous of all dishes made at İznik", and 11 Persian paintings and drawings. But he also donated works of art to many other French musea, like the Guimet Museum and the Musée d'Orsay.
- Charles Koechlin (1867–1950) was a French composer.
- Paul Koechlin or Jean-Paul Koechlin (1881–1916) was an aviation pioneer. He was a nephew of Paul Koechlin the race car driver. He created his first plane in 1908 and started the company "Aéroplanes P. Koechlin" in Boulogne-Billancourt. He collaborated with the Austrian pioneer Alfred de Pischof in the creation of other planes. Later he participated in early aviation races between 1910 and 1912, and had an aviation school in Paris. He died at the Battle of the Somme in 1916.

== Swiss line ==
- Alphons Koechlin (1821–1893), Swiss politician
- Carl Koechlin (1856–1914), Swiss politician
- Alphons Koechlin (1885–1965), Swiss pastor
- Carl Koechlin (1889–1969), Swiss business executive
