= Alphons Koechlin (pastor) =

Swiss pastor (1885–1965)

- Born: 6 January 1885; Basel, Switzerland
- Died: 8 May 1965 (aged 80); Basel, Switzerland
- Occupation: Pastor
- Spouse: Emilie Thurneysen

Alphons Koechlin (6 January 1885 – 8 May 1965) was a Swiss pastor. He held leading positions in Swiss Protestantism and was president of the Federation of Swiss Protestant Churches from 1941 to 1954 and of the Basel Mission from 1936 to 1959. He was involved in setting up the World Council of Churches and sat on its central and executive committees from 1948 to 1954.

== Biography ==
Alphons Koechlin was born in Basel into the Koechlin family. He was the son of Carl Koechlin, and his brother was Carl Koechlin. He married Emilie Thurneysen, daughter of Emil Thurneysen, a ribbon manufacturer. From 1903 to 1908 he studied theology in Lausanne, Basel and Marburg, and from 1908 to 1909 he spent time in Paris, Oxford and Edinburgh.

From 1910 to 1921 Koechlin was pastor in Stein am Rhein, and from 1921 to 1954 early preacher (Frühprediger) at St. Martin's Church in Basel. From 1933 to 1954 he was president of the church council (Kirchenrat) of Basel-Stadt. He joined the executive board of the Federation of Swiss Protestant Churches (Schweizerischer Evangelischer Kirchenbund) in 1935 and was its president from 1941 to 1954. From 1936 to 1959 he was president of the Basel Mission.

From the 1920s Koechlin had close ties with the ecumenical movement. He took part in all the major conferences from Stockholm in 1925 to Evanston, Illinois, in 1954, and sat on the international leadership of the World Alliance of YMCAs. He was involved in setting up the World Council of Churches and, after it was constituted, was a member of its central committee and its executive committee from 1948 to 1954, among other roles.

During the Nazi era Koechlin contributed substantially to keeping up the exchange of information between the churches, for example through regular contacts with George Bell, the Anglican Bishop of Chichester. In Switzerland he passed on reports of the threat to the Jews to the political authorities and urged them to be more generous towards refugees. From 1943 to 1946 he presided over the Swiss church aid committee for Protestant refugees (Schweizerisches kirchliches Hilfskomitee für evangelische Flüchtlinge).

Koechlin received an honorary doctorate from Heidelberg University in 1929 and was an honorary lecturer at the theological faculty of the University of Basel. He died in Basel on 8 May 1965.

== Bibliography ==
- H. d'Espine, Alphonse Koechlin, pasteur et chef d'Eglise, 1885–1965, 1971
- A. Lindt, "Alphons Koechlin", in Der Reformation verpflichtet, 1979, 183–186
- H. Kocher, Rationierte Menschlichkeit, 1996

=== Sources ===
- G. Bell, Briefwechsel 1933–1954, ed. A. Lindt, 1969
