= Johann Rudolf Geigy-Merian =

Swiss industrialist and politician (1830–1917)

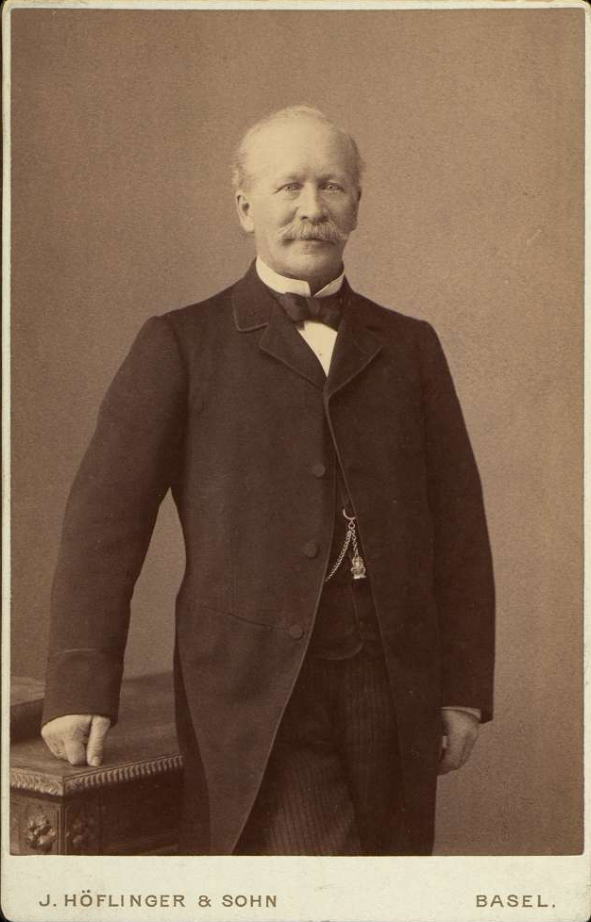
- Johann Rudolf Geigy-Merian, photograph, before 1892.
- Born: 4 March 1830; Basel, Switzerland
- Died: 17 February 1917 (aged 86); Basel, Switzerland
- Occupations: Industrialist, banker, politician
- Known for: Development of the dyestuff and chemical-extraction enterprise J. R. Geigy
- Spouse: Maria Merian (m. 1855)
- Children: Johann Rudolf (b. 1862); Karl (b. 1866)

Johann Rudolf Geigy-Merian (4 March 1830 – 17 February 1917) was a Swiss industrialist, banker and politician from Basel. He was instrumental in expanding the family firm J. R. Geigy into large-scale chemical and dyestuff production and held leading roles in Basel banking and Swiss economic organisations and institutions.

== Early life and education ==
Geigy-Merian was born on 4 March 1830 in Basel, the son of the merchant and industrialist Karl Geigy (1798–1861) and Sophie Preiswerk. His family belonged to the Basel commercial elite, with his father active in the drug and dyestuff trade and his future father-in-law Samuel Merian involved in silk-ribbon manufacturing and banking.

After completing gymnasium Geigy-Merian undertook a three-year apprenticeship in his father's business, and subsequently spent several years working as a merchant in France, England and India. Around 1856 he took over his father's drug-trading business in Basel.

In 1855 he married Maria Merian (1837–1912), daughter of the Basel silk-ribbon manufacturer, merchant and councillor Samuel Merian.

== Career ==
=== Business ===
The firm with which Geigy-Merian was associated developed out of the trading house founded in Basel by his great-grandfather Johann Rudolf Geigy-Gemuseus (1733–1793), specialising in materials, chemicals, dyes and remedies. In the mid 19th century the business moved from trading in drugs and dyewoods towards processing dyewoods and manufacturing dyes.

In 1857 Geigy-Merian and Johann Jakob Müller-Pack acquired a plot at the Riehenteich in Basel's Rosental quarter and established a dyewood-milling and dye-extraction plant. Within a few years the firm began production of synthetic fuchsine, one of the early aniline dyes.

From the late 1850s the company increasingly concentrated on synthetic dyes. He introduced steam-powered extraction equipment at the Rosental site, and the focus shifted from natural dyewoods to large scale production of synthetic aniline dyes and allied chemical products. Around 1888 he engaged the chemist Traugott Sandmeyer to work on more efficient routes to synthetize indigo, strengthening the firm's position in wool dyes.

In 1898 Geigy-Merian established a production facility across the German border at Grenzach on the Rhine, which became a key site for dyestuff and intermediate manufacture. In 1901 the company was converted into a public limited company, and in 1914 it adopted the name J. R. Geigy AG. The expansion of Geigy is considered part of the emergence of the Basel chemical industry in the late 19th century.

In addition to the dyestuff business, Geigy-Merian was active in banking. In 1863 he co-founded the Basler Handelsbank together with his brother-in-law Alphons Koechlin and several private bankers, and from 1893 to 1913 he served as chairman of its board of directors. He also sat on the boards of the Gotthard Railway (Gotthardbahn) and the Swiss Central Railway (Schweizerische Centralbahn).

In 1880 Geigy-Merian acquired the newspaper Schweizer Grenzpost and developed it into a publication oriented towards liberal economic policy and trade issues.

=== Politics ===
From 1857 to 1864 Geigy-Merian served as a civil judge (Zivilrichter) in Basel, and from 1864 to 1879 as an appellate judge (Appellationsrichter). In 1864 he was elected to the Grand Council (Grosser Rat) of the canton of Basel-Stadt.

Geigy-Merian was associated with liberal economic positions. In 1876 he was among the founders of the Basler Handelskammer (Basel Chamber of Commerce), serving as its president from 1891 to 1898, and from 1882 to 1898 he was a member of the Schweizerische Handelskammer (Swiss Chamber of Commerce). After the 1878 federal elections he was elected to the National Council (Switzerland), where he served from 1879 to 1887.

His interventions on issues such as labour conditions and social policy, including a lecture on the "worker question" in Basel in 1890, have been noted in later studies of Swiss industrial and social policy.

== Legacy ==
For his role in developing the Basel chemical and dyestuffs industry, the University of Basel awarded Geigy-Merian an honorary doctorate (Dr h.c.) in 1910. Later corporate and regional histories have treated the Geigy enterprise as one of the foundations of the modern Basel life-sciences cluster.

Through a sequence of mergers and reorganisations, J. R. Geigy became first part of Ciba-Geigy and subsequently Novartis, one of the major global pharmaceutical groups of the late 20th century.

== Personal life ==
Geigy-Merian's children included Johann Rudolf (born 1862) and Karl (born 1866), both of whom later entered the family business. The family maintained the Bäumlihof estate on the outskirts of Basel as a country residence, where a gardener, Jakob Bär-Gutmann, was reported in 1967 to have worked for forty years as head gardener for the Geigy family.
