= Carl Koechlin (business executive) =

Swiss business executive (1889–1969)

- Born: 4 November 1889; Basel, Switzerland
- Died: 10 June 1969 (aged 79); Riehen, Switzerland
- Occupations: Business executive; politician
- Spouse: Rosalie Vischer (m. 1918)

Carl Koechlin (4 November 1889 – 10 June 1969), also known as Carl Koechlin-Vischer, was a Swiss business executive and politician. He joined the chemical company Geigy in 1908 and was its chairman from 1949 to 1967. He presided over the Basel Chamber of Commerce from 1927 to 1951 and over the Swiss Federation of Commerce and Industry from 1951 to 1964.

== Biography ==
Carl Koechlin was born in Basel into the Koechlin family. He was the son of Carl Koechlin and the brother of Alphons Koechlin. He was educated at the humanist gymnasium (Humanistisches Gymnasium) in Basel, the commercial school in Neuchâtel and the Berlin commercial college (Handelshochschule Berlin). In 1918 he married Rosalie Vischer, daughter of Peter Vischer, a ribbon manufacturer.

In 1908 Koechlin joined Geigy, where he became director in 1918 and a member of the board of directors in 1919. He was delegate of the board from 1939 and its chairman from 1949 to 1967. From 1927 to 1951 he presided over the Basel Chamber of Commerce (Handelskammer Basel-Stadt), and from 1951 to 1964 over the executive board (Vorort) of the Swiss Federation of Commerce and Industry. From 1932 he was a member of the Bank Council of the Swiss National Bank. During the Second World War he headed the chemicals and pharmaceuticals section of the War Industry and Labour Office (Kriegs-Industrie- und -Arbeits-Amt). From 1918 to 1938 he sat in the Grand Council of Basel-Stadt as a member of the Liberal-Democratic group.

Koechlin received honorary doctorates from the law faculty of the University of Basel in 1936, and in 1958 from its faculty of philosophy and natural sciences and in economics from the University of Lausanne. He died in Riehen on 10 June 1969.

== Bibliography ==
- Basler Nachrichten, 10 June 1969
- National-Zeitung, 11 June 1969
