= Alphons Koechlin (politician) =

Swiss politician

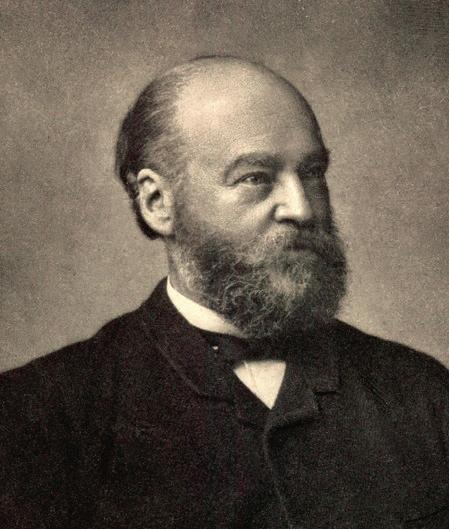

Alphons Koechlin (6 April 1821 – 6 February 1893) was a Swiss politician and President of the Swiss Council of States (1874/1875).

Preceded by Alois Kopp	President of the Council of States; 1874/1875	Succeeded by Gottlieb Ringier
