= Frank Garbely =

Swiss investigative journalist

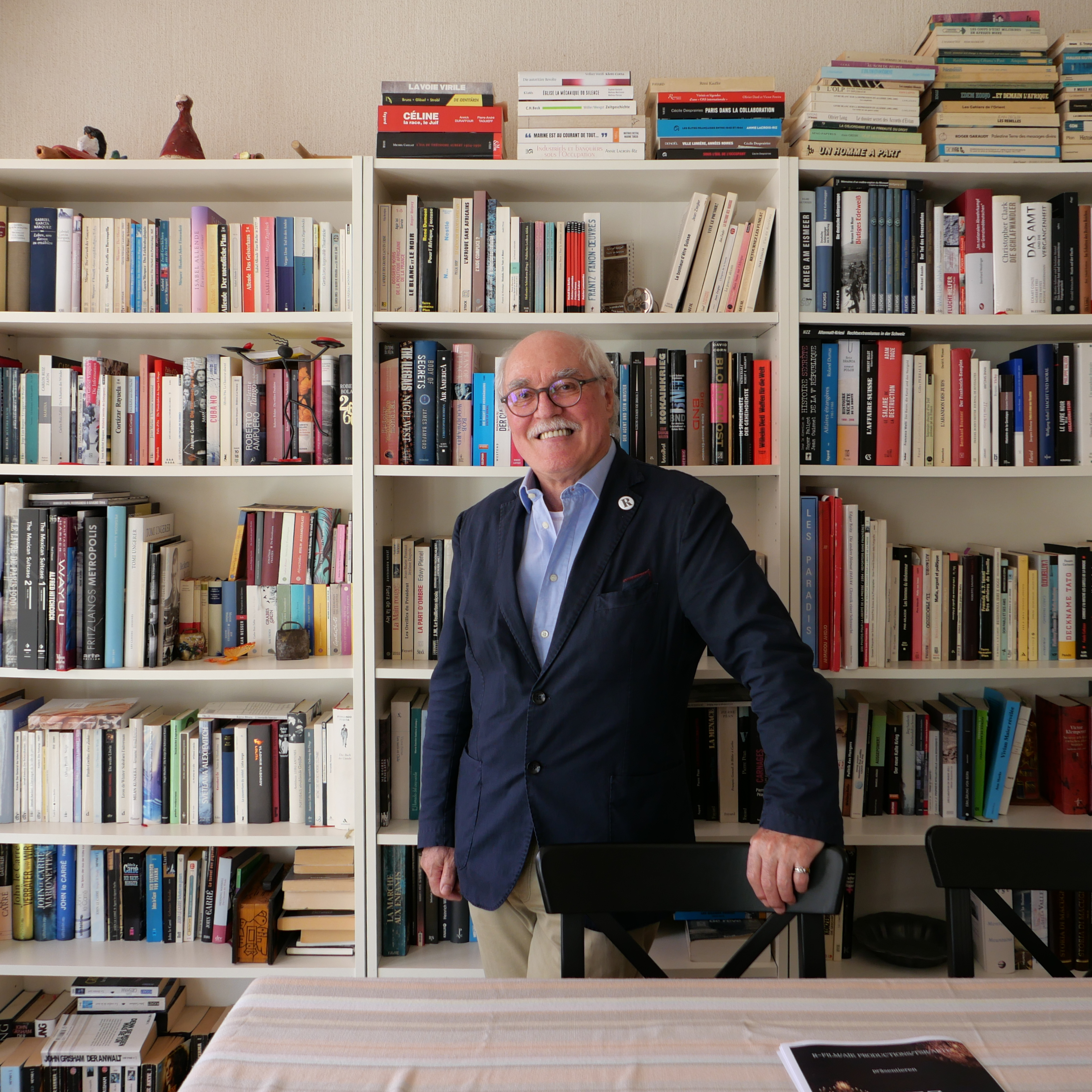
- Born: 10 November 1947 (age 78); Reckingen

Frank Garbely (born 10 November 1947) is a Swiss independent journalist, non-fiction writer, author and director of documentary films. He is one of Switzerland's best known investigative journalists and has uncovered numerous scandals in his home country as well as abroad.

== Life and career ==
=== Early life ===
Reckingen in 1955

Garbely spent the first decade of his life in his birth-place of Reckingen, a Catholic-dominated village in Goms, the uppermost part of the River Rhône valley between its source and Brig in the German-speaking part of the Swiss canton of Valais. As the child of poor peasant he was used to tending to his parents' cattle and goats.Garbely recollects in a biographical interview from 2018 that already as a primary-school pupil he was fascinated by news and reportages, especially from radio broadcasting. This was in contrast with the preachings of the priest who would regularly denounce the local news agent.

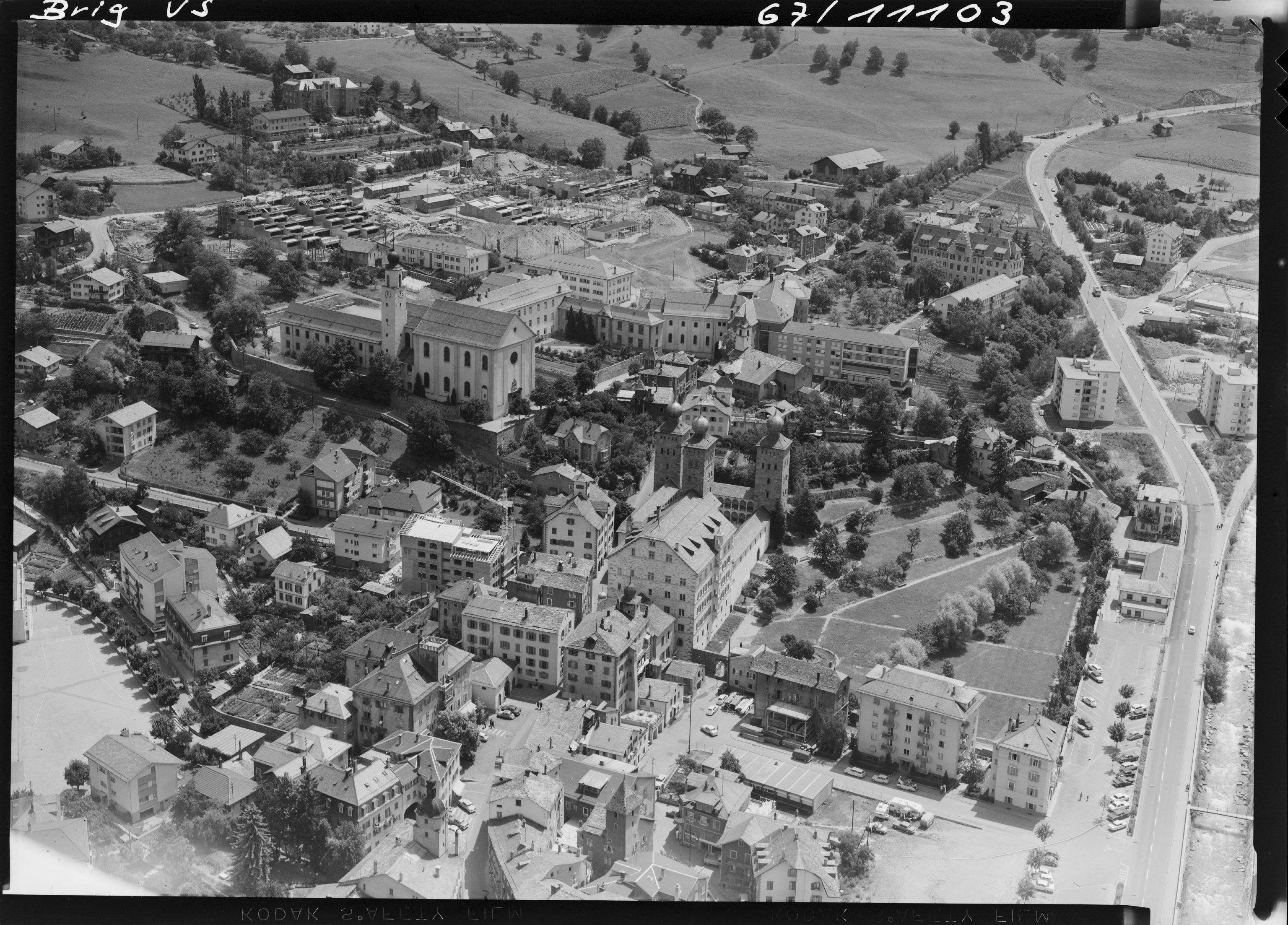
Brig College in 1967.

At the age of about eleven years, Garbely had to spend six months for health reasons in Montana, a village in the French-speaking part of Valais. This experience opened his horizon and mind beyond the valley of Goms and made him decide to leave his home-village. Hence, he wrote a letter to the director of the Kollegium Spiritus Sanctus Brig ("College of the Holy Spirit"), then as now the only German-language college in the canton of Valais, and after passing an entrance exam was allowed to attend the former jesuit school.

As a college student in the town of Brig, Garbely got further politicized and entered the public stage following the protests of 1968. He became particularly active against Catholicism, which strongly dominated the political and social life in Valais at the time. In early 1969, the daily newspapers Walliser Bote and Walliser Volksfreund published an opinion piece by Garbely in which he advocated for co-determination for students. Shortly afterwards, he was invited to debate the issue on a public panel with members of the National Council, the Council of States and the State Council of Valais. In that discussion he criticised that school education in the canton was fundamentally limited to Christian views.

In June 1969, Garbely and the then 83-year-old Karl Dellberg, who was one of the founders of the socialist movement in the Upper Valais, published a jointly written essay with the provocative title "Orgasmus" in the youth magazine Reflex. They used it to call out Catholic conservatism in the canton and to advocate for freedom of speech. Garbely later called Reflex the original seedbed for spreading progressive ideas in the Upper Valais.

=== University studies and early career in print media ===
The current logo of the Rote Anneliese

After taking Matura and graduating from college in 1970 Garbely started studying sociology, ethnology and journalism at the University of Zurich. He continued on occasions to write for newspapers in his home-canton of Valais, especially opinion pieces for Walliser Bote and Walliser Volksfreund.

Logos of Swiss press outlets which Garbely worked for as a freelancer
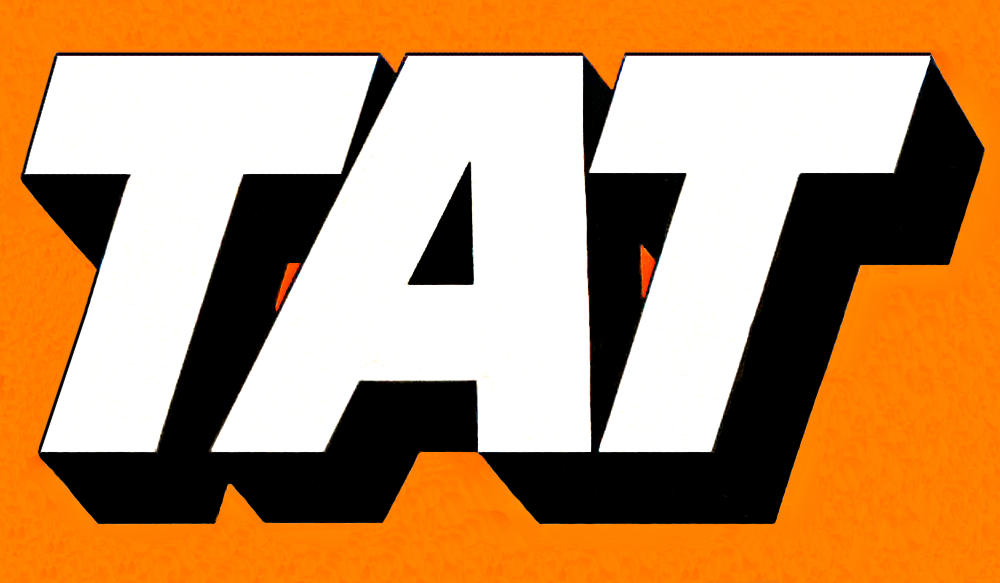
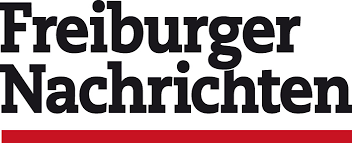
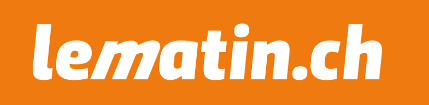
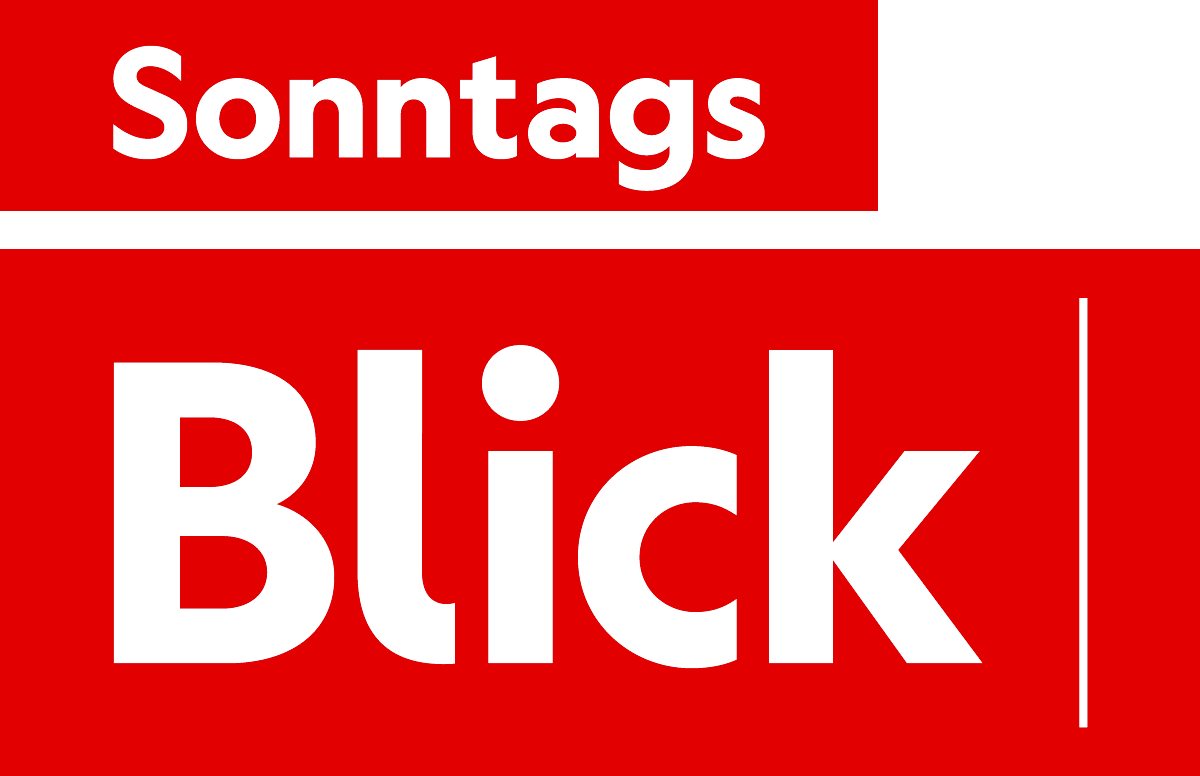

In late 1971, Garbely became one of the co-founders of the new social movement Kritisches Oberwallis – KO ("Critical Upper Valais") and represented it in public debates. Another co-founder was Peter Bodenmann, who would go on to become a member of the National Council for the Social Democratic Party of Switzerland (SP) and SP-president. In 1973, the group founded the magazine Rote Anneliese – RA ("Red Anneliese"). The name is a play on words, since the Anneliese was supposed to deliver analysis rather than news. The first issues were produced by Garbely and his wife with other students from Valais in Zurich during weekends.

After finishing his university studies, which he partly spent at the University of Geneva, in 1976 Garbely became the correspondent of the social-liberal tabloid Die Tat ("The Deed") in Romandy, the French-speaking Western part of Switzerland. It was published by the cooperative federation of Migros, Switzerland's largest retail company, since 1935 in various forms. However, when the Migros-management fired editor-in-chief Roger Schawinski because of his left-wing editorial policy in September 1978 and the staff protested by going on strike, the company stopped publishing the paper altogether.

Garbely subsequently started working as a freelance journalist. Still at the end of 1978 he caused major headlines in his home canton with a series of articles in the Journal du Valais about fascist activities in Valais. Right-wing extremists reacted aggressively in their editorial reactions and even threatened physical violence on Garbely.

At the beginning of 1980, Garbely became the first journalist to be employed by the Rote Anneliese as an editor in a paid full-time job. The aim of his hiring was the journalistic professionalisation of the magazine. However, Garbely left the job already at the end of the same year following a conflict with co-founder Bodenmann about the separation of journalism and party politics in the editorial policy. While he kept on contributing to the Rote Anneliese, he focused during the 1980s on writing as a freelance journalist for various print outlets of Swiss media, amongst them:

- Berner Zeitung,
- Construire,
- Freiburger Nachrichten,
- L'Illustré,
- Journal du Valais,
- Das Konzept,
- Schweizer Illustrierte,
- SonntagsBlick,
- Tages-Anzeiger Magazin,
- Tribune de Lausanne / Le Matin,
- Die Weltwoche,
- Wir Brückenbauer and
- Die Wochenzeitung (WOZ)
Logos of foreign press outlets which Garbely worked for as a freelancer

In addition, he occasionally published stories in the Austrian news magazine Profil and the West German weekly Stern.

Garbely also soon ventured beyond the genre of print journalism into radio production, especially for the Swiss Radio: Radio of the German and Romansh Switzerland (SR DRS), a public broadcaster. In 1983, he published his first radio documentary with the title "Saxon 53". The piece, which the daily Thuner Tagblatt called «perfectly produced», told the story of a popular uprising in Valais which took place in 1953. Some 4.000 peasants and their families had assembled in the village of Saxon to protest against the decision of the Federal Council to permit the importing of fruits from Italy. The event escalated into an open revolt when some of the farmers set train wagons on fire to block the railway line that linked Paris and Milan. He followed up with an audio reportage about Karl Dellberg, who was known as "The Lion of Valais" and whom he had frequently interviewed during the final decade of Dellberg's life. WIth another radio production about the history of the Swiss intelligence agencies he further grew his status as a top-researcher on espionage affairs. Altogether, he earned himself a reputation during those years as being "one of the foremost experts on illegal drug trade and arms trafficking in Switzerland."

==== Role in the Barschel affair 1987 ====
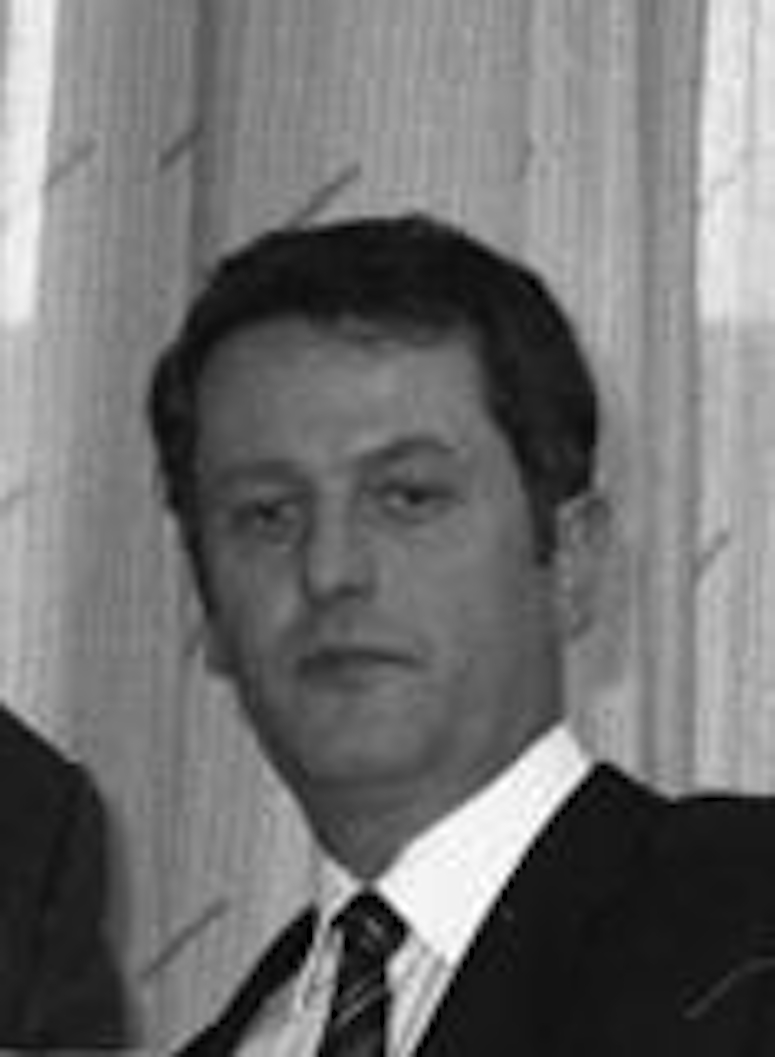
Barschel in 1983.

On 10 October 1987 Garbely and photographer Angelo Guarino from the Keystone photo agency went to Geneva International Airport upon the request of a former TAT-colleague who then worked at the Stern magazine in Hamburg. Garbely's mission was to confirm the arrival of Uwe Barschel, a West German top-politician of the conservative Christian Democratic Union (CDU). He had been forced to resign as Minister-President of the state of Schleswig-Holstein a week earlier follwong accusations about a "dirty tricks" election scandal. But when Garbely addressed Barschel in German, the disgraced politician replied in English, pretending not to understand German and denying his identity. The very last photographs of Barschel, when he was still alive, were taken during this brief encounter. Garbely's subsequent attempt to follow Barschel's taxi cab in another taxi cab failed.

The Beau-Rivage

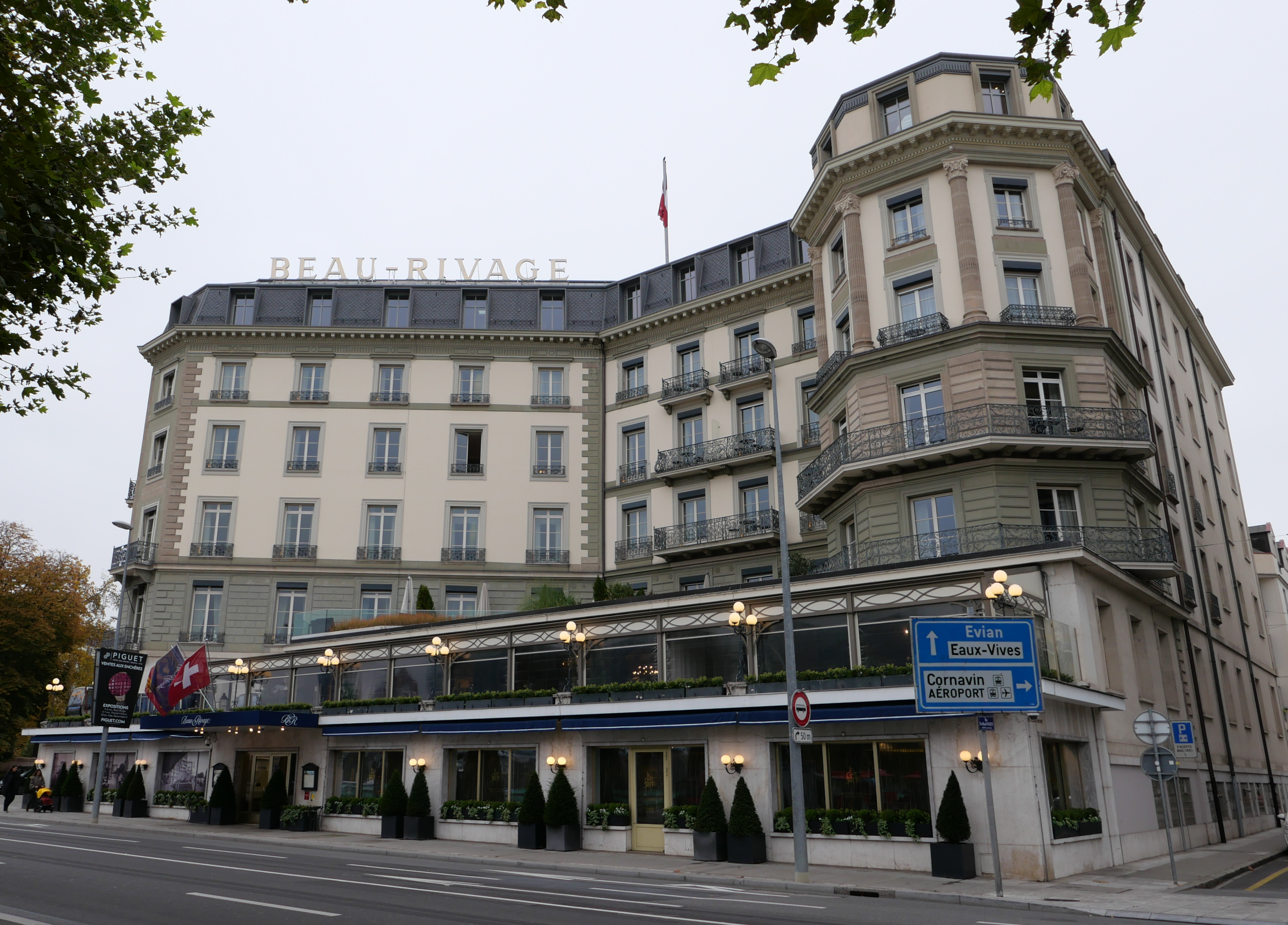
The lake view side of the hotel. On the right is a street sign that gives directions to the airport.

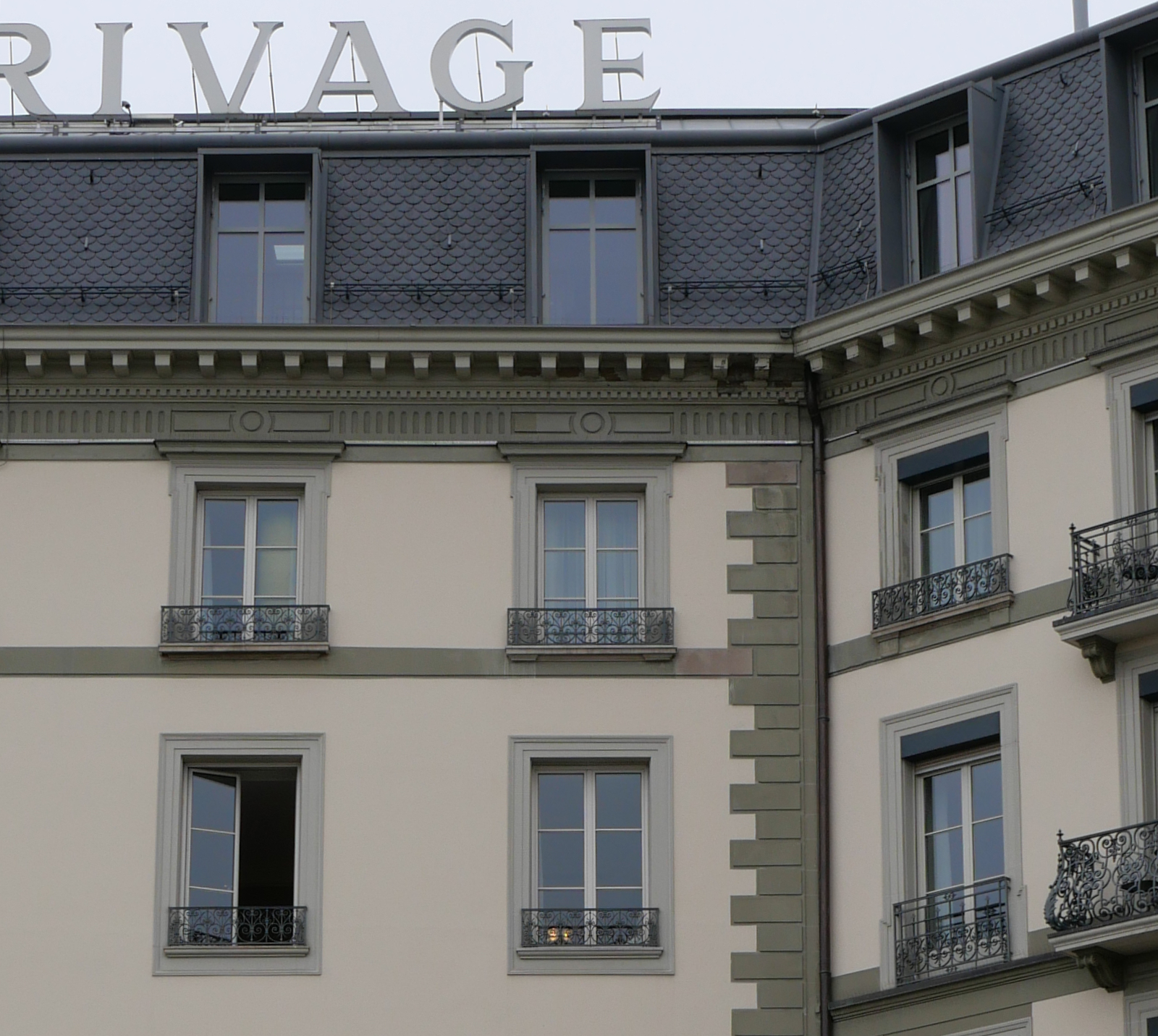
The window of room No. 317, where Barschel died (in the centre at the bottom of the photo, the third window below the "E" of the illuminated lettering of "RIVAGE" on the roof, to the right of the open window).

Shortly afterward Garbely confirmed on behalf of a team from Stern, which was en route to Geneva, that Barschel had checked into the five-star luxury hotel Beau Rivage. When Stern-reporter Sebastian Knauer found Barschel dead in his hotel room the next day, he called Garbely on the telephone and asked him to come to the hotel. Upon arrival in the hotel lobby, Garbely clandestinely received from his Stern-colleagues their photo film rolls. They included the controversial picture which Knauer had taken of Barschel's clothed body in the full bathtub and which was soon to become one of the most iconic images in West Germany's history. Those film rolls provided the only reliable photos from the scene, since the camera used by the Genevan police investigators delivered under mysterious circumstances only flawed pictures.

Writing for the Swiss weekly Weltwoche, Garbely subsequently gave evidence that Barschel had falsely claimed in his handwritten notes to have cruised around Geneva Airport a few times, since the airported is located directly at the border with France and crossing the Swiss-French checkpoints was not permitted for taxi drivers. With regard to Barschel's note about having taken a stroll close to the airport with the mysterious Robert Roloff, who could allegedly have been a witness to his defence, Garbely argued that this claim was impossible considering the evident check-in at the Beau Rivage.

In Uwe Boll's movie Barschel – Mord in Genf? ("Barschel – Murder in Geneva?"), released in 1993, Garbely was played by actor Hanfried Schüttler in the scene at the airport.

When Heinrich Wille became the chief prosecutor in Lübeck in 1994, the investigation into Barschel's death gained new momentum and Garbely went to the Northern German city to testify in court about his activities regarding the affair. Wille later wrote in his book Der Mord, der keiner sein durfte ("The Murder which was not allowed to be") that he alerted Garbely on that occasion about his suspicion that the journalist Günther Prütting, with whom Garbely had collaborated in 1988 for a story published in the Hamburger Morgenpost about possible indications towards murder, may exploit Garbely to extract information from the private detective Jean-Jacques Griessen, who had died under mysterious circumstances himself while investigating Barschel's death. Garbely stated in an interview from 2018, without mentioning specific names, that the German colleague spied on him and then 'sent the invoices for his services to the German agent, who had a false Swiss passport and stayed in the hotel nextdoor".

Twenty years after Barschel's mysterious death, Garbely produced his own documentary film about the affair, focusing on the investigation by Griessen as well as on the findings by Hans Brandenberger, a retired professor of toxicology at the University of Zurich. While it was aired in Switzerland by the public broadcaster Télévision Suisse Romande, German TV networks declined to do so.

=== Career in TV journalism ===
The logo of Schweizer Fernsehen until its 2011 merger with Schweizer Radio DRS into Schweizer Radio und Fernsehen (SRF; "Swiss Radio and Television")

Garbely's growing reputation as an investigative journalist raised the interest of the Schweizer Fernsehen – SF ("Swiss Television"), the public broadcaster for German-speaking Switzerland. When the SF-director of the editorial department for documentary films, Otto C. Honegger, wanted to take over a story from Garbely about a cigarette and drug smuggler from Basel, Garbely insisted on being included in the film shooting to protect his sources. Thus he started working in 1988 as a freelancer for the SF-flagship programme "Rundschau (Swiss TV program)" ("Panoramic View").

The logo of the SonntagsZeitung.

At the same time, Garbely continued to publish his reportages in a variety of print media outlets. In one outstanding instance he wrote a story in early 1989 for the SonntagsZeitung that the Federal prosecutor's office had received an explosive report about large-scale money laundering. The office then had Garbely's phone bugged for two months to identify his source. It informed him about the surveillance operation only one and a half years later.

The Alusuisse plant in Chippis in 1949.

In 1990, Garbely and his colleague Pascal Auchlin published the book Umfeld eines Skandals ("Environment of a Scandal"), which was based on court records and police files. It illustrated how the lax policies of Swiss prosecutors and police made the country a favoured place for international organised crime. In the 1990 bestseller list of the Swiss Bookseller and Publishers Association it was number four in the nonfiction section.

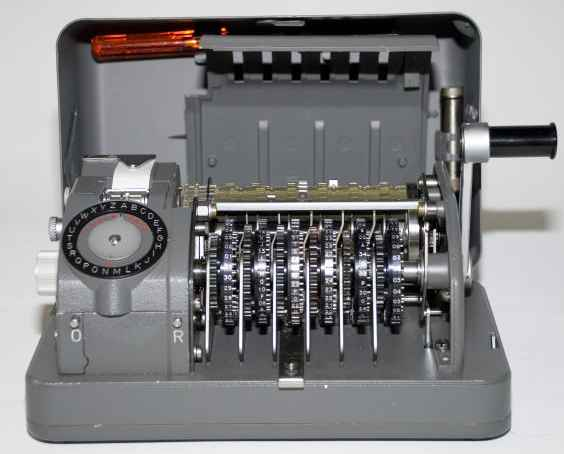
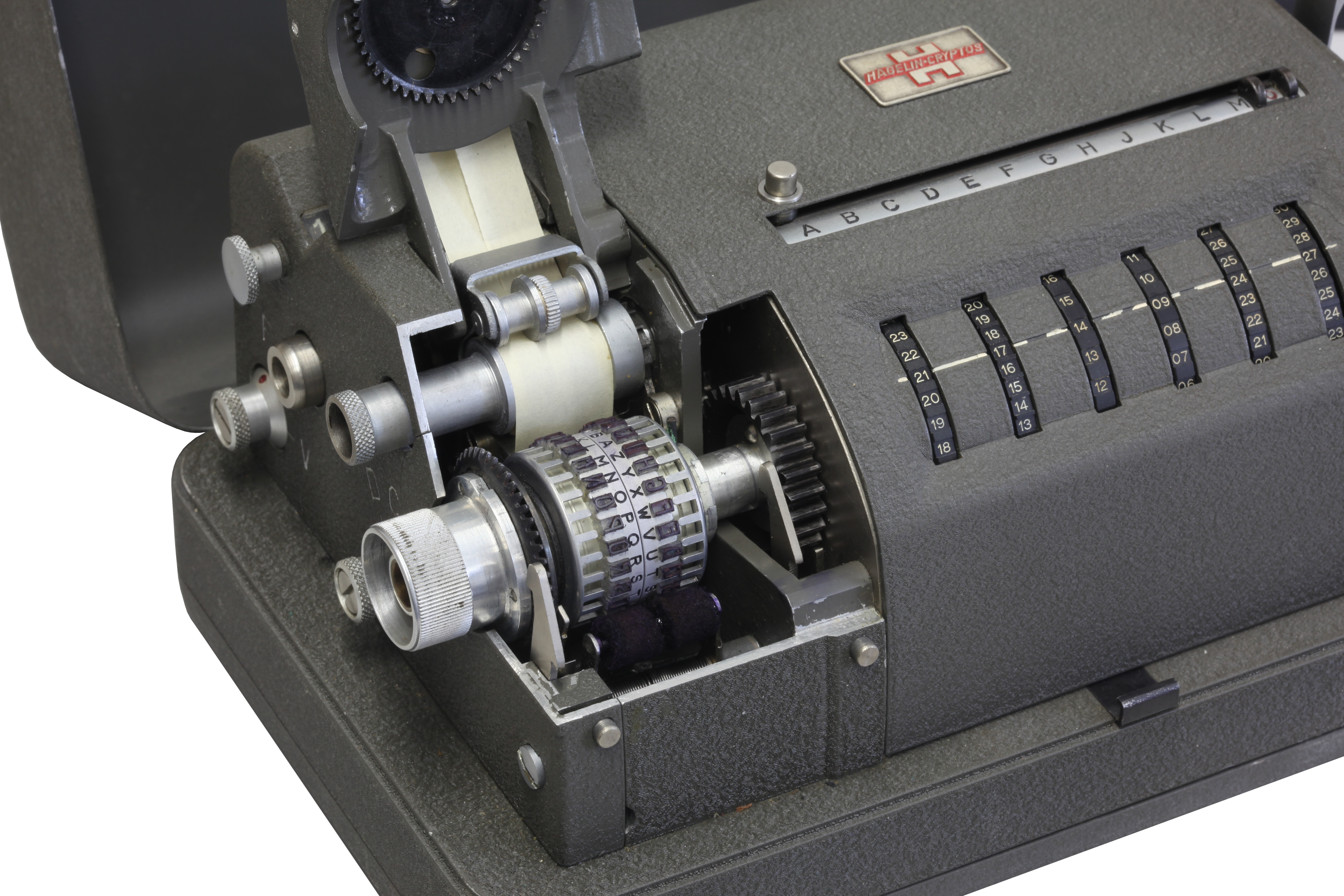
A rotor machine, model Hagelin CX-52 by Crypto AG.

In addition, Garbely further pursued his interest in highlighting controversial issues from his home canton of Valais. In 1989, he contributed a chapter of almost 70 pages to an edited volume about the Swiss industrial group Alusuisse. Its predecessor, the Aluminium-Industrie Aktiengesellschaft (AIAG), had set up an aluminium production plant in Chippis in the 1900s. Garbely detailed how the Zurich-based corporation and its successor companies basically treated Valais as a colony by exploiting workers and the environment ruthlessly. In an interview with the Rote Anneliese on the subject Garbely stated that he was primarily interested in ordinary people, who had made and experienced history, in the sense of people's history rather than historiography from the point of view of the elites.

In 1991, Garbely wrote the script for the drama play "Seelenmarkt" ("Soul Market") which was performed as part of the musical-theatrical spectacle Gratzug 91 ("Wild Hunt 91") in Brig-Glis to celebrate the 700th anniversary of the Old Swiss Confederacy. The Walliser Bote wrote in its review that the play demonstrated

«in an oppressively impressive way that the past, history, does not only consist of political decisions, heroic wars and economic development, but always and above all of individual fates, which not only support this progress and heroism, but above all suffer it.»

The logo of TSR until its 2010 merger with Radio Suisse Romande (RSR) into Radio Télévision Suisse (RTS).

Another outstanding scandal that Garbely worked on was the one which later became known as Operation Rubicon by the West German Federal Intelligence Service (BND) and the US Central Intelligence Agency (CIA). A CIA historical account called it the "intelligence coup of the century". It was accomplished through the sale of manipulated encryption technology from Swiss-based Crypto AG, which was secretly owned by BND and CIA since 1970. Garbely started researching the subject at the beginning of 1993 when Hans Bühler, a Swiss sales engineer working for Crypto AG, was released from detention in Iran after almost one year. Though he could not deliver compulsory evidence, "Rundschau" aired his reportage in early 1994. When the CIA account leaked in 2020, the tabloid 20 Minuten – the daily newspaper with the largest circulation in Switzerland – portrayed Garbely under the headline:

«This man made CIA and BND tremble»

In 1997, Garbely left "Rundschau" after almost a decade. In a biographical interview from 2018 he appreciated that TV journalism offered better legal protection against being sued and thus greater freedom of expression. However, he disagreed with a changing work culture that followed the example of TV networks in the US. Garbely claims that research on the ground decreased, whereas reportages were increasingly designed at the desktop and illustrated accordingly. Subsequently, he started working freelance for the TV programme Mise au point ("Focus") of the French-language public broadcaster Télévision Suisse Romande (TSR).

=== Independent documentary filmmaker ===
The logo of the International Consortium of Investigative Journalists (ICIJ). Garbely was one of the first journalists from Switzerland to be appointed a member of the group.

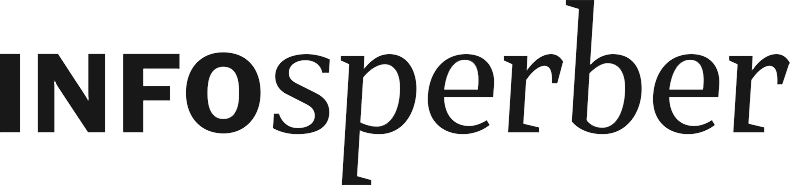
The logo of the INFOsperber, which is published by the nonprofit «Schweizerische Stiftung zur Förderung unabhängiger Information – SSUI» ("Swiss Foundation for Supporting Independent Information").

Since 1998, Garbely has focused though on working as an independent author and director of documentary films. He continued to pursue his long-standing interests, i.e. Switzerland's dealings with Nazi Germany, scandals involving intelligence services, drugs and arms trade (especially politically motivated assassinations), white-collar and environmental crimes as well as issues from his home canton of Valais. The daily Walliser Bote called Garbely in 2006 a documentary filmmaker

«whose works look like narrative films. They are extremely entertaining, very compact in themselves, exciting, they touch, they inform. His films affect, make you think, stir you up, they are objective – and don't incite. These are films that encourage conversation.»

Garbely, who described himself as a "dossier man" in the biographical interview from 2018, has also continued to write for various print and [online media. In 2020, for instance, he published a reportage in the online newspaper INFOsperber about how the Swiss pharmaceutical company Lonza has covered up highly toxic pollution from its industrial landfill site near Visp in Valais. Not least, Garbely is still active for the Rote Anneliese which he had co-founded in 1973 and which has been one of Switzerland's few surviving papers originating from the protests of 1968. In an interview from 2020 about the Crypto-scandal he emphasized:

«While there is a clear pecking order in the world, it is the duty of journalists to keep a sharp eye on the powerful.»

Asked in the biographical interview of 2018 why he was particularly interested in political scandals, Garbely explained:

«I often use a wooden board as an example: if you break it, you can see the structures. It's the same in society. That is why it is so important to take an interest in political conflicts or scandals. You usually don't learn anything new from happy people.»

Garbely and his wife, who is an expert on energy policies, live in Geneva. They have two grown-up children.

== Selected writings ==
- Briger Herbst: Eine unbestellte Festschrift, with Tony Eggel, Brig 1972
- Hochschule und Forschung – ihr Bild in der Öffentlichkeit, Swiss Science Council, Bern 1979
- Die Grüne Faust, Zurich 1982
- Kanton Alusuisse: Alusuisse im Wallis, in: Silbersonne am Horizont: Alusuisse – Eine Schweizer Kolonialgeschichte, pp. 194–262, Limmat Verlag Zurich 1989
- Das Umfeld eines Skandals / Contre-enquête : Des faits incroyables, with Pascal Auclin, Werd-Verlag Zurich 1990 / Favre Lausanne 1990
- Seelenmarkt : Texte zum Gratzug 91, Verlag R. Gentinetta, Brig 1991
- Evitas Geheimnis – Die Nazis, die Schweiz und Peróns Argentinien, Rotpunktverlag, Zurich 2003
- Die Streiks – Bau des Simplontunnels, Unia Union (Section Upper-Valais), Brig 2006

== Filmography ==
- 1989: Waffen gegen Geiseln ("Arms for Hostages"), feature film (director)
- 1990: In Helvetias geheimen Diensten ("In the Secret services of Helvetia"), feature film (director) with Urs Kern
- 1991: Paul Dickopf – Ein Mann mit Legende ("Paul Dickopf – The Man with a Legend"), feature film (director)
- 1997: V-Mann Tato – Der gejagte Jäger ("Police informer Tato – the hunted hunter"), feature film (director)
- 1997: Hitlers Sklaven ("Hitler's slaves"), feature film (director) with Frédéric Gonseth
- 1998: Evitas Geheimnis – Die Schweizer Reise ("Evita's secret: the Swiss connection"), feature film (director & script) SRG SSR / SRF
- 2001: Gondo – Stationen einer Rückkehr, feature film (script)
- 2005: Moumié – Der Tod in Genf ("Moumié – Death in Geneva"), feature film (director & script) RTS / ARTE
- 2006: Paradis fiscal – Enfer social ("Fiscal Paradise – Social Hell"), feature film (director & script with Mauro Losa)
- 2007: Ritz, feature film (director & script) SRG SSR / RTS / RSI / SRF
- 2007: L’affaire Barschel – Silence de mort ("The Barschel affair – deadly silence"), feature film (director & script) RTS
- 2009: L'affaire Octogone / Schwarze Kassen ("The Octogon affair / Dark Money"), feature film with Fabrizio Calvi and Jean-Michel Meurice, ARTE
- 2010: Die Hölle im Paradies ("Hell in Paradise"), feature film (director & script) SRF / 3sat
- 2011: Témoin C – Genève, ville des ombres / Zeuge C – Genf, Stadt der Schatten / Witness C – Geneva, City Of Shadows, feature film (director & script) RTS / SRF / 3sat
- 2014: L'enlèvement / Die Entführung ("The Kidnapping"), feature film (director, script with Juan Gasparini) RTS

== Awards and honours ==
- 2008: PRIX FELIX MOUMIE de la résistance et de la liberté
- 2010: 1st prize of the Egyptian film critics at the Ismailia International Film Festival for Documentary & Short films in Ismailia, Egypt, for Hell in Paradise
- 2010: Grand Prix for a Foreign Film at the Humandoc International Film Festival in Warsaw, Poland, for Hell in Paradise
- 2010: Tapis de Bronze at the International Environment Film Festival Kairouan in Kairouan, Tunisia, for Hell in Paradise
- 2011: 2nd Prize at the International Film & TV Festival of Detective Films in Moscow, Russia, for Hell in Paradise
