= Walter Biel =

Swiss journalist and politician (1933–2024)

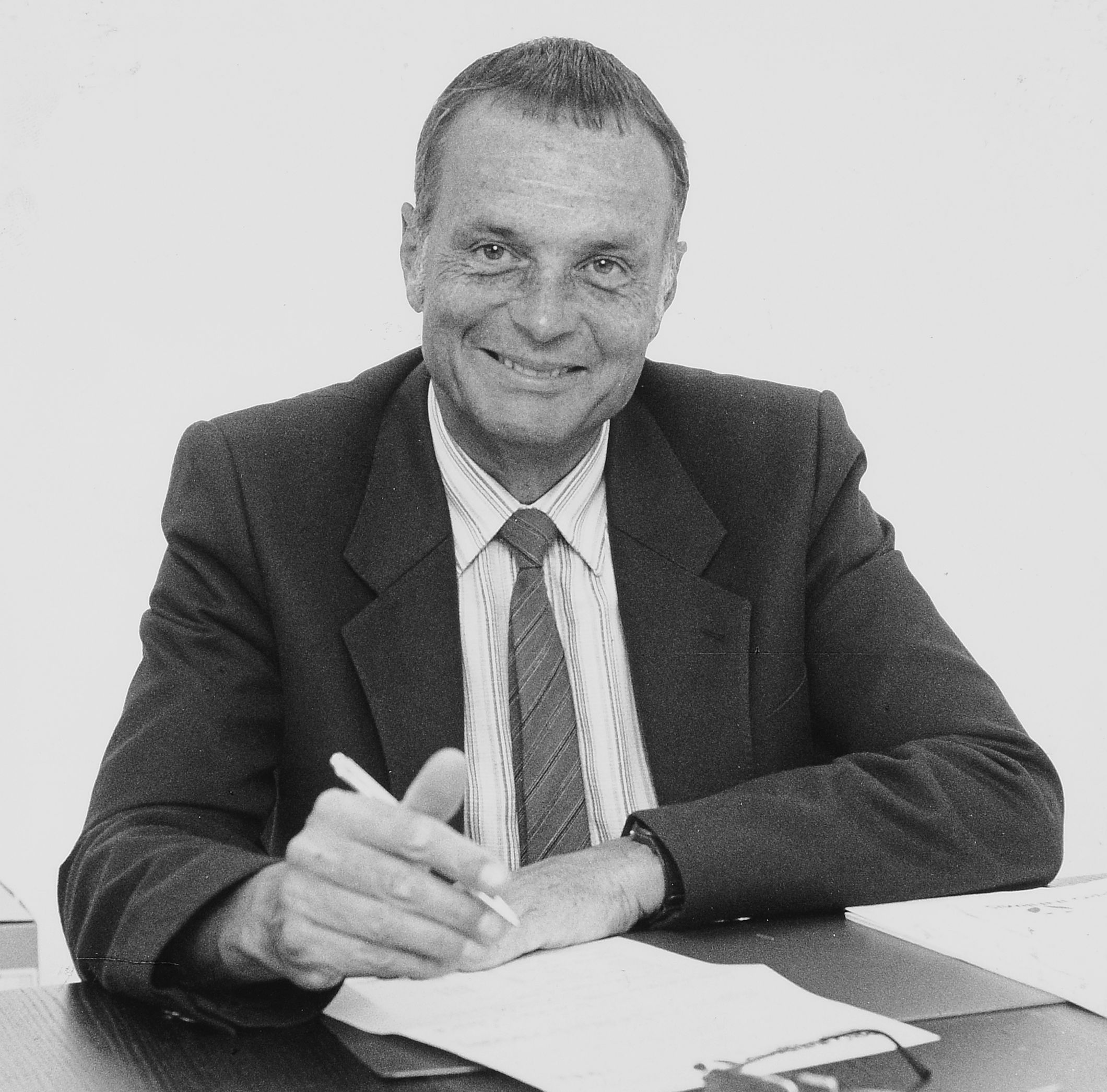
- Biel in 1987

Member of the Swiss National Council for Zürich
- In office 4 December 1967 – 24 November 1991

Personal details
- Born: 20 July 1933 Pfaffenhoffen, France
- Died: 1 February 2024 (aged 90) Basel, Switzerland
- Party: LdU
- Education: University of Basel
- Occupation: Journalist

Walter Biel (20 July 1933 – 1 February 2024) was a Swiss journalist and politician of the Alliance of Independents (LdU).

== Biography ==
Born in Pfaffenhoffen on 20 July 1933, Biel earned a doctorate in economic sciences from the University of Basel. In 1959, he began working as a journalist for Die Tat and in 1971 became editor-in-chief for the publishing section of Migros. In 1977, he joined the company's upper management.

In 1967, Biel was elected to represent the Canton of Zürich in the National Council as a member of the LdU, where he served until 1991. He became president of the National Roads Review Commission and sponsored the Federal popular initiative "Democracy in the construction of national roads", which bears his name. From 1978 to 1985, he was president of the LdU.

Walter Biel died in Basel on 1 February 2024, at the age of 90.

== Publications ==
- Die Industrialisierung Süditaliens (1959)
- Zukunftsgerechte Finanzreform für die Schweiz (1971)
- Dichtung und Wahrheit : Migros und Steuern : eine Studie des Migros-Genossenschafts-Bundes Zürich (1981)
- Innovative Schweiz : Zwischen Risiko Und Sicherheit (1987)
