= Fabrizio Calvi =

French journalist and writer (1954–2021)

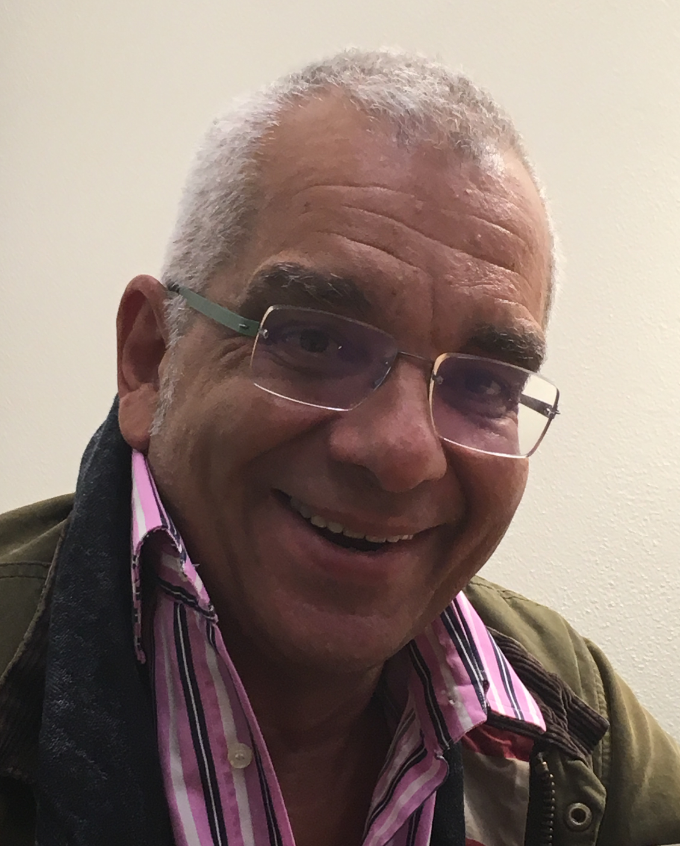
Calvi in 2019

Fabrizio Calvi (27 May 1954 – 23 October 2021) was a French investigative journalist who specialized in cases involving organized crime and the secret services. He worked as a writer and journalist and was the author of several films. He wrote more than 20 books and 40 films, including Série noire au Credit Lyonnais, L'orchestre noir, Les routes de la terreur 911 and Elf, une afrique sous influence, all of which were broadcast by Arte.

== Career ==
Calvi was involved in the birth of the newspaper Libération, where he specialized in foreign policy. From 1976, he covered social movements and terrorist groups in Italy. By the late 1970s, he followed the Mafia wars in Sicily and witnessed the birth of the anti-Mafia pool of the court of Palermo. From his many visits to Sicily, he wrote two bestsellers, La vie quotidienne de la Mafia and L'europe des parrains, both of which have been translated into ten languages, and a dozen documentary films such as La parade des saigneurs and Familles macabres.

In 1979, Calvi handled major investigations for Liberation, writing The Islamic Bomb and publishing revelations about the role played by France in a vast trafficking operation of uranium from Namibia, which was in direct violation of a UN resolution.

In 1981, Calvi published his first major paper at Grasset, "Camarade P.38," which focused on a gang of young killers of journalists in Milan during its "années de plomb." He was awarded a special mention at the 2009 Cesco Tomaselli Prize in Italy.

From 1983 to 1984, Calvi was the editor-in-chief in charge of major investigations and cases at the Matin de Paris. He published revelations about arms trafficking and drug use in the Balkans (an investigation taken up by the daily La Republica that led to a documentary that aired on Antenne 2). After leaving the Matin de Paris, he published two books on the secret services, including the OSS la guerre secrète en France pendant la seconde guerre mondiale, a book based on records declassified by the CIA, unpublished testimonies of former agents and the German secret agents responsible for tracking them.

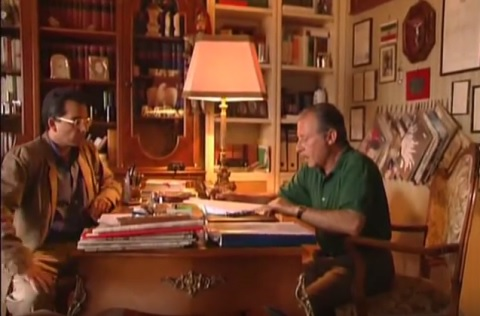
Fabrizio Calvi interviewed judge Paolo Borsellino on 21 May 1992, two days before the Capaci massacre

As part of a film on the relationship between the Mafia and the Italian media magnate Silvio Berlusconi, Calvi interviewed with the judge Paolo Borsellino. Two months later, Borsellino was killed by the Mafia. The transcript of the interview, made public by the weekly L'Espresso in 1994 on the eve of Berlusconi's first election victory, provoked strong reactions in Italy. A pirated version of a rudimentary edit of this interview has been broadcast by RAI and circulates on the internet (where it has been seen by over 600,000 users). The full version was released in Italy in December 2009 on DVD by the newspaper Il fatto quotidiano.

His participation in nine films on the secret services during World War II allowed Calvi to work with Igor Barrère and Pierre Desgraupes. His collaboration with Jean-Michel Meurice led to a dozen films about the Mafia, a series on the Crédit Lyonnais scandal, Série noire au Crédit Lyonnais and another series on the Elf affair including the widely acclaimed movie Elf, une Afrique sous influence. His investigation on black terrorism in Europe during the Cold War led to two films, including L'orchestre noir, which was broadcast by Arte and RAI.

Calvi's knowledge of American archives led him to revisit some of the darkest chapters of World War II. He published and codirected Pacte avec le diable, a book and film devoted to American intelligence and the Holocaust. Written with Marc Mazurovsky of the United States Holocaust Memorial Museum, Le festin du Reich covers the economic pillage of France by the Germans.

Between 2007 and 2010, Calvi researched the FBI, resulting in a book published by Fayard in late January 2010 and in five films released by France 5. A book, 11 Septembre, la contre-enquête and two films, Les routes de la terreur, aired on Arte in September 2011.

Beginning in 2013 Calvi, worked with SEPT.info, a magazine and website based in Switzerland. His first series was a 1992 investigation of Berlusconi's relationship with the mafia. Other topics covered for SEPT.info included lengthy behind-the-scenes investigations of the September 11 attacks, Edward Snowden, Switzerland's spy nest, the Jimmy Hoffa mystery, the FBI's campaign against Martin Luther King, the FBI's secret war against hackers, the mafia against journalists in Italy, the Charlie Hebdo attack and mental illness in Bali.

== Death ==
Calvi committed physician assisted suicide on 23 October 2021 in Switzerland. In a Facebook posting, Calvi disclosed that he had decided to take his own life because he was dealing with a terminal illness.

== Bibliography ==
- Italie 77, Le Seuil, 1977
- La Vie Quotidienne de la mafia, Hachette, 1986
- Intelligences secrètes annales de l'espionnage (with Olivier Schmidt), 1988
- OSS, la guerre secrète en France, Hachette, 1990
- 20 ans de police politique, (with Jacques Harstrich), Calmann-Lévy, 1991
- L'Europe des Parrains, Grasset, 1993 RG
- Les nouveaux réseaux de la corruption (with Leo Sisti), Albin Michel, 1995
- Piazza Fontana (with Frederic Laurent) Mondadori, Milan, 1997
- L'Œil de Washington (with Thierry Pfister), Albin Michel, 1997
- Série noire au Crédit Lyonnais, (with Jean-Michel Meurice), Albin Michel, 1999
- Le repas des fauves (with Thierry Pfister), Albin Michel, 2000
- France – États-Unis, cinquante ans de coups tordus, (with Frederic Laurent), Albin Michel, 2004
- Pacte avec le diable, les États-Unis, la Shoah et les nazis, Albin Michel, 2005
- Le festin du Reich, le pillage de la France (1940–1944), (with Marc J Masurovsky) Fayard, 2006
- Camarade P 38, Grasset, 1982. (Special mention for Prix Cesco Tomaselli, 2009).
- FBI : L'histoire du bureau par ses agents, (with collaboration of David Carr-Brown) Fayard, 2010 ISBN 978-2213638690.
- 11 Septembre, la Contre-enquête, Fayard 2011.
- Un Parrain à la Maison Blanche, Albin Michel, 2020.

== Filmography ==
- 1982: Le terrorisme, with Michel Honorin (documentary), TF1
- 1983: La filière bulgare, (documentary 15 min)
- 1987: L'armée rouge, Taxi VI press (documentary)
- 1989: Les dissidents des brigades rouges (documentary).
- 1988: Portrait d'une ville : Milan (documentary)
- 1991: L'homme qui voulait s'offrir Hollywood de Jean-Pierre Moscardo (documentary 52 min)
- 1994: Les secrets de la guerre secrète, (documentary 9 x 90 min), France 2 et France 3
- 1994: La parade des saigneurs, with Jean-Michel Meurice (documentary), ARTE
- 1995: Familles macabres, with Jean-Michel Meurice (documentary 90 min), ARTE
- 1996: La justice en Europe (documentary)
- 1996: Autopsie d'un massacre, with Jean-Michel Meurice (documentary 90 min), ARTE
- 1997: Dernières nouvelles de la Mafia, with Jean-Michel Meurice (documentary 40 min), ARTE
- 1998: Terrorisme en Italie Part 1 : Piazza Fontana, l'histoire d'une machination – Part 2: La stratégie de la tension), with Jean-Michel Meurice (documentary), ARTE & RAI 20
- 1999: Série noire au Crédit Lyonnais (Arnaque à Hollywood, Des trous dans le béton, Jeunes loups et grands fauves, La peur au ventre, L'heure des comptes, Sauve qui peut), with Jean-Michel Meurice (documentary), ARTE (Lauriers de la radio et de la télévision, Club audiovisuel de Paris)
- 2000: ELF : une Afrique sous influence, with Jean-Michel Meurice (documentaire 2h16), ARTE (prix de l'enquête documentaire au festival international du scoop et du journalisme d'Angers – France 2000)
- 2000: ELF : les chasses au trésor, with Jean-Michel Meurice, (documentary 87 min), ARTE
- 2001: La prise du pouvoir par François Mitterrand, (documentary 90 min), ARTE
- 2002: Comment ça va la santé publique? (documentary 3 x 52 min), ARTE
- 2005: Pacte avec le diable, (documentary 52 min) with Steeve Bauman, Canal +
- 2007: L'affaire Octogone, with Jean-Michel Meurice & Frank Garbely (documentary), ARTE
- 2010: Série FBI (Copyright FBI, Un cauchemar américain, FBI contre Mafia, sur le fil du rasoir, American psycho, La menace terroriste), with David Carr-Brown, (documentaire 52 min), France5
- 2011: Les routes de la terreur 1993–2001 : Le compte à rebours, (documentary 52 min), Arte.
- 2011: Les routes de la terreur 1979–1993 : Ils étaient du côté des anges, (documentary 52 min), Arte. (les étoiles de la SCAM)
- 2012: Noire Finance, (documentary 2 x 52 min), Arte.
