= Die Tat (Swiss newspaper) =

Swiss newspaper published by Migros from 1935 to 1978

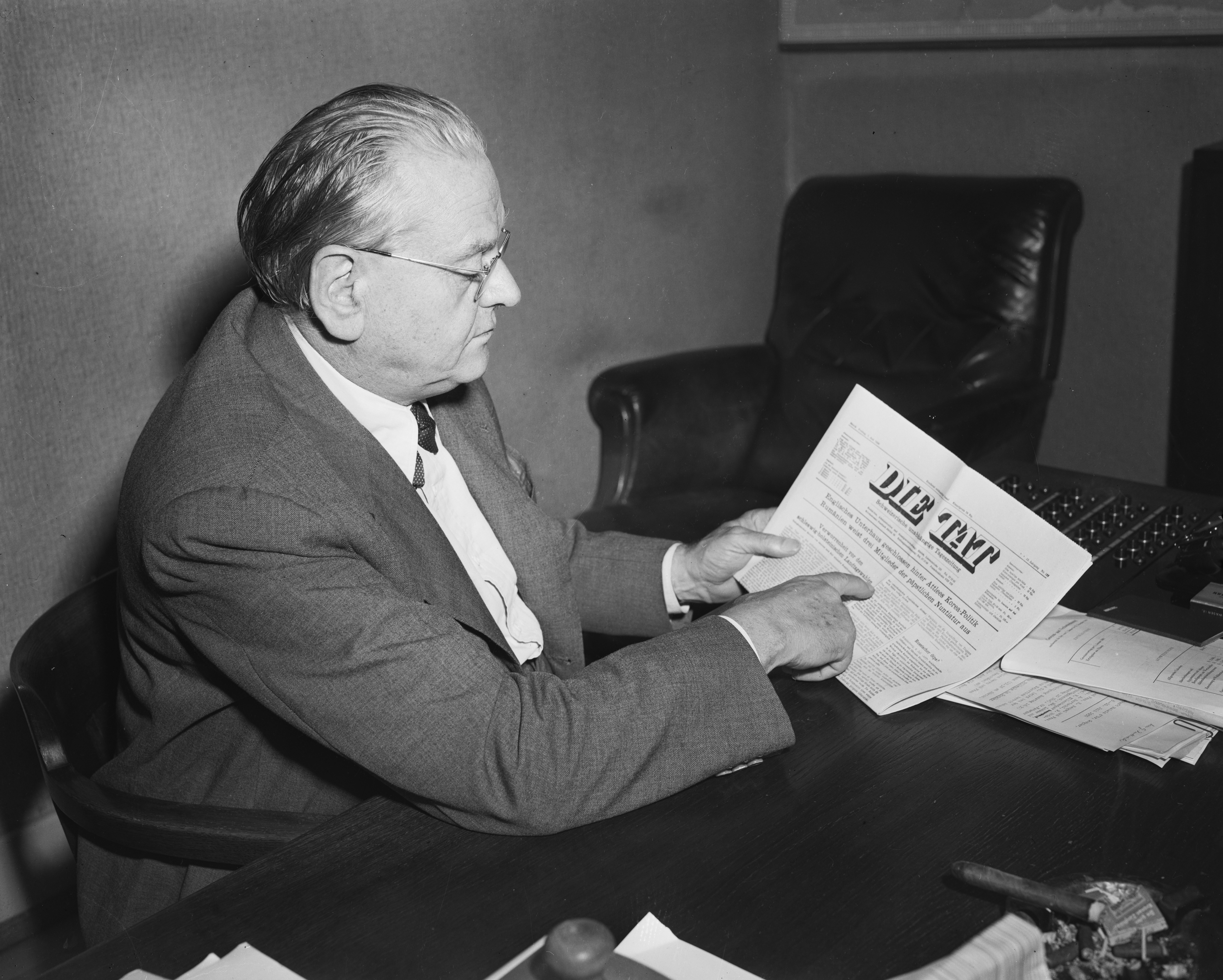
Gottlieb Duttweiler, the founder of the newspaper Die Tat (July 7, 1950)

Die Tat was a social liberal Swiss newspaper published by Migros from 1935 to 1978, first as a weekly, then as an evening daily and finally as a morning tabloid.

It was launched by the founder of Migros, Gottlieb Duttweiler. While the weekly newspaper was the party organ of the Alliance of Independents, the daily paper quickly emancipated from it and also gained a high reputation outside Switzerland, in particular thanks to its weekend supplement Die literarische Tat under the direction of Max Rychner and Erwin Jaeckle and the collaboration of numerous well-known journalists. The decline of the political press in the 1970s, combined with a lack of advertising revenue due to its proximity to Migros, led to the closure of the daily newspaper at the end of March 1977.

The then president of Migros, Pierre Arnold, tried to continue the title as a tabloid. However, after 16 months, the paper's harsh style, which was critical of the economy, forced him to dismiss editor-in-chief Roger Schawinski. Without consulting the editorial team, he appointed Karl Vögeli in his place, who was supposed to guarantee a more moderate direction for the paper. The following protest strike by the editorial team led to the closure of the tabloid at the end of September 1978, just one and a half years after its launch.

The Swiss National Library has fully digitized Die Tat and made it available online in 2016.

== Weekly newspaper (1935–1939) ==
Die Tat
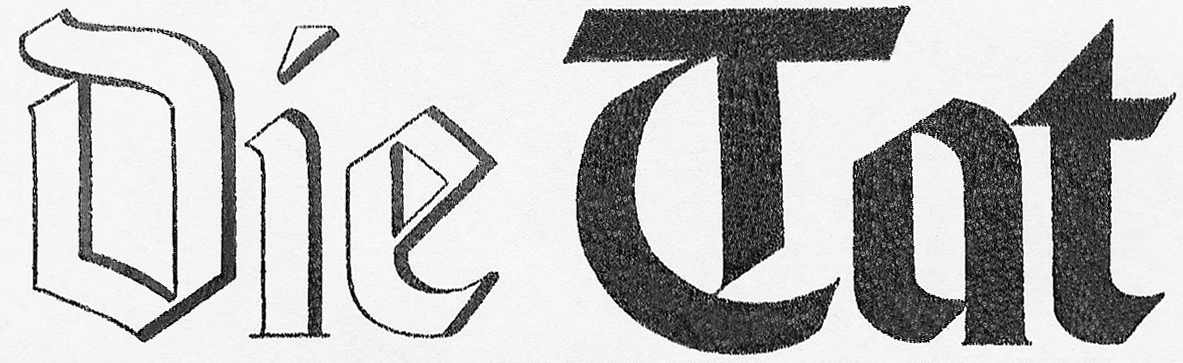
- Editor-in-chief: Hermann Walder (1935–1937) Eugen Theodor Rimli (1937–1939) Willy Aerni (1939)
- Editor: Gottlieb Duttweiler
- Founded: November 12, 1935
- Ceased publication: September 29, 1939
- Country: Switzerland

For the first four years of its existence, Die Tat was a weekly newspaper. The first number appeared on November 12, 1935, with the subtitle "Wochenpost der sieben Unabhängigen" ("Weekly mail of the seven independents"). It referred to the seven members of the "Association of Independents" who had won a seat on the National Council in 1935: Franklin Bircher, Gottlieb Duttweiler, Ulrich Eggenberger, Heinrich Schnyder, Willy Stäubli, Fritz Wüthrich and Balthasar Zimmermann.

Duttweiler wrote that they wanted to produce "a simple, serious weekly 'accountability report' from the 7 independents for their friends". No advertisements were taken out so as not to compete with the press and to remain independent (there were only a few advertisements from the travel agency Hotel-Plan, which was founded in the same year and belonged to Migros; still written as such at the time). Die Tat wanted to "report objectively while avoiding controversy" and also "let opponents have their say briefly." He also stated as a motive for founding the newspaper the resistance to National Socialism in Switzerland, which Die Tat opposed without compromise from the very beginning.

=== Editorial team ===
The newspaper's first editor-in-chief was Hermann Walder, the lawyer for Migros. He served until 19 November 1937, when he was succeeded by journalist Eugen Theodor Rimli. Rimli remained editor-in-chief until 28 April 1939, when Willy Aerni, managing director of the Alliance of Independents (LdU), took over the position.

After leaving the editorship, Walder joined the editorial board of Die Tat, where he remained until the newspaper's separation from Gottlieb Duttweiler in October 1943. Rimli continued to contribute articles to the newspaper after stepping down as editor-in-chief. Following the launch of the daily edition, Aerni served as head of the administration and advertising department until the end of May 1948.

=== Development ===
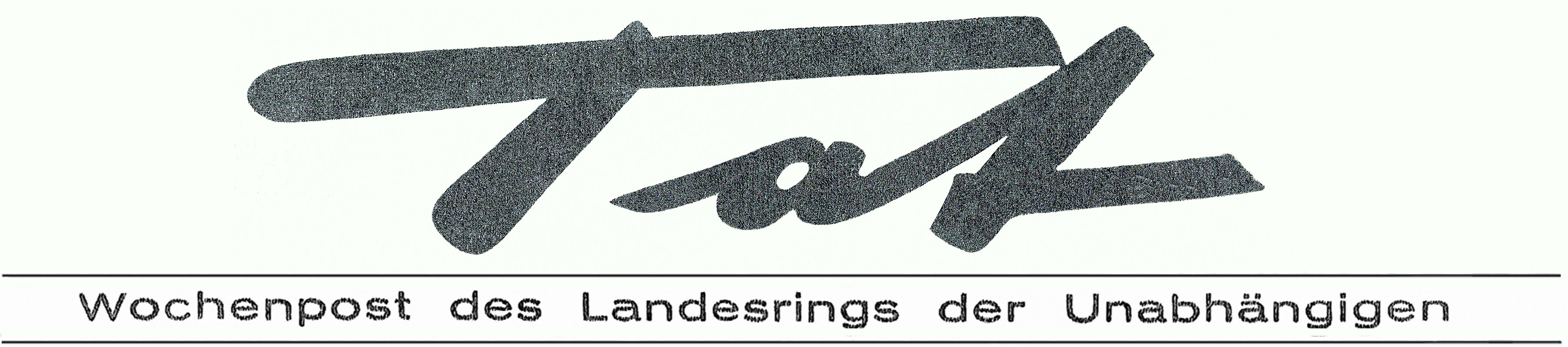
Logo of the weekly newspaper Tat 1937–1939, the "Schlengge"

Die Tat was printed in the old Züricher Post printing works on the premises of the old university on St.-Peter-Strasse in the center of Zurich. At the beginning of 1937, after the founding of the LdU, the newspaper was given a larger format and a size of 6 to 8 pages instead of 4, exceptionally also 12 and 16 pages, changed its title from "Die" to "Schlengge" and its subtitle to "Wochenpost des Landesrings der Unabhängigen". From then on, it was published on Fridays instead of Wednesdays (only the first issue was published on a Tuesday). From this point on, it also took advertisements.

Following Migros' decision to publish a daily newspaper, the last issue of the weekly Tat was published in its previous form on September 29, 1939. Until the publication of Brückenbauer (today's Migros-Magazin) on September 25, 1942, Migros continued to publish Tat (Wochenpost) with a different editorial mission.

== Daily newspaper (1939–1977) ==
Die Tat
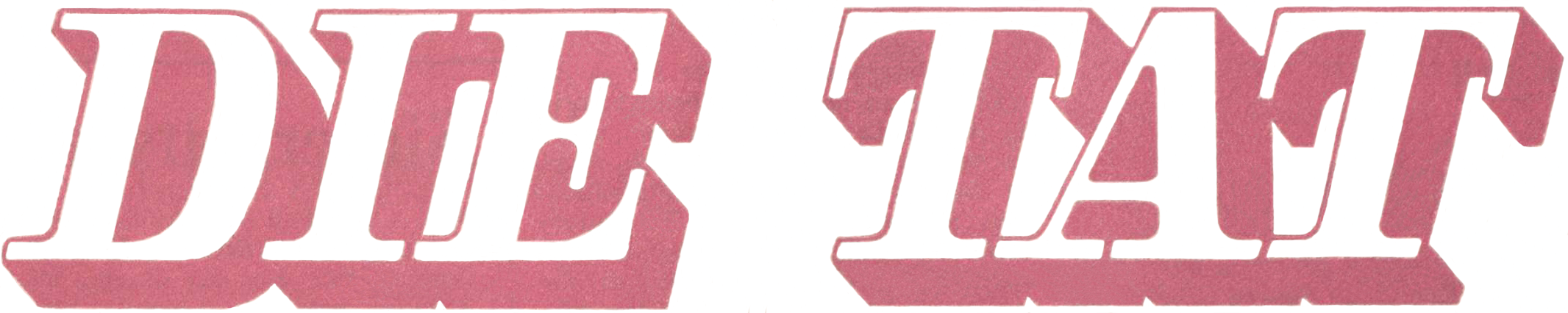
- Editor-in-chief: Max Rychner (1939–1943) Erwin Jaeckle (1943–1971) Walter Biel (1971–1977)
- Editor: Migros
- Founded: October 2, 1939
- Ceased publication: April 1, 1977
- Country: Switzerland

On September 8, 1939, Die Tat announced the conversion of the weekly newspaper into a daily newspaper on October 1.

Duttweiler initially wanted to call it Der Tag, with the previous weekly paper appearing as a Friday edition. However, as a result of this and the change of title, the Federal Council stated that it was a newly founded newspaper, which was forbidden according to a Federal Council resolution of September 8, 1939. Duttweiler then decided to keep the name Die Tat and not to publish the Friday edition as a continuation of the weekly paper. The Federal Council then approved the daily newspaper, which first appeared on October 2, 1939 (available the evening before), now with the subtitle "Schweizerische unabhängige Tageszeitung" (Swiss independent daily newspaper), six times a week in the evening, always with the date of the next day. Until November 7, 1939, Tuesday was the publication-free day, then Sunday.

Duttweiler justified the need to expand Die Tat into a daily newspaper by pointing out that the rest of the Swiss daily press was closed to the LdU. However, only a daily newspaper could meet the new, larger tasks facing the LdU movement; a political movement without a daily newspaper was "not viable in our country in the long term". Even as a daily newspaper, Die Tat continued its strict rejection of National Socialism. It was banned in Germany and Hungary just two months after its launch, and a further two months later in Italy.

=== Original editorial team and contributors ===
During the Second World War, the newspaper's editorial staff included specialists in foreign affairs, domestic politics, economics, literature, the arts, and military affairs.

From 1939 to 1943, the newspaper was led by literary critic Max Rychner as editor in charge. In 1943, the title was changed to editor-in-chief, a position held by journalist Erwin Jaeckle until 1971 and by Walter Biel until 1977. Jaeckle also headed Literarische Tat from 1962 onward.

The first editorial team included Rychner in the feuilleton section, although military service kept him largely abroad until 1943. Foreign affairs coverage was overseen by journalist Herbert von Moos, formerly of Schweizer Zeitung and Schweizerische Republikanische Blätter, who also became known through his political commentary broadcasts on Radio Beromünster. Because of his anti-Nazi stance, von Moos came under pressure from the German legation and Federal Councillor Marcel Pilet-Golaz. He was formally dismissed from Radio Beromünster for "negligence" and resigned from the newspaper in December 1940 for stated "health reasons".

Domestic affairs editor Felix Moeschlin, president of the Swiss Writers' Association, remained with the newspaper until 1942, after which he became president of its editorial commission. Local affairs editor Karl Gnädinger, who wrote under the pseudonym "Nepomuk", remained with the paper until his accidental death in 1943. Economist Charles La Roche oversaw economic coverage until 1940, when he was replaced by Hans Munz.

Permanent contributors included Jean Rudolf von Salis on foreign affairs; Ernest Grosselin on military topics; journalist Paul Gentizon, formerly a correspondent for Le Temps and the Gazette de Lausanne; writer and theatre critic Bernhard Diebold; music critic Robert Oboussier; and Peter Meyer, editor of the architecture and art magazine Das Werk.

=== Wartime expansion and editorial reforms ===
At the end of 1941, the Tat editorial office, administration and print shop moved into new premises on Limmatstrasse in the Migros-Genossenschafts-Bund (MGB), which was founded the same year. In 1943, the new editor-in-chief Erwin Jaeckle introduced various changes. He abolished the Bernese and Basel local sections and integrated them into the general section, which enabled him to appoint the Bernese editor as the editor for the Federal Parliament and the Basel editor as the foreign editor. This in turn allowed Max Rychner to return from the foreign section to his traditional feature section. Jaeckle also introduced a women's page, was the first Swiss newspaper to regularly publish excerpts from the world press and launched the first radio page in the Swiss press in 1944. A special feature of the Tat from the very beginning was the daily topical picture page with an average of eight pictures on the last page of the main paper. From July 31, 1943, the newspaper was published with a new typeface, the titles in Antiqua instead of sans-serif and with black negative bars as column headers in the political section. From March 12, 1944, Tat was also published on Sundays again and thus from then on seven times a week. In December 1952, the editorial and administrative offices moved to Limmatplatz, where the Migros headquarters are also located.

=== Erwin Jaeckle and editorial direction ===
The outstanding figure of the daily newspaper Die Tat was Erwin Jaeckle, who was also politically active (1942–1950 in the Zurich municipal council, 1945 president, 1947–1962 in the National Council for the Alliance of Independents). Duttweiler had initially intended him to be editor-in-chief, but Jaeckle wanted to work on his habilitation and suggested Max Rychner instead, a colleague of his at the feuilleton Der Bund at the time. In the end, however, he chose a career in journalism instead of academia and joined the paper on January 1, 1943. He wanted to be hired as domestic editor and not as Rychner's superior out of respect for Max Rychner, who was 12 years his senior and had experience in the press, and he demanded that the editorial office not report directly to Duttweiler, but to a works commission that would act as an intermediary between the editorial office and Duttweiler. This is what happened. However, after he had made various suggestions for improvement, the works commission urged him to become the first nominal editor-in-chief after all, and Jaeckle agreed after some deliberation. Under his leadership, Die Tat gained a great reputation as a daily newspaper that extended beyond the borders of Switzerland, particularly through the weekend supplement Literarische Tat (until the end of 1960 "Kunst - Literatur - Forschung"), which was supervised by Max Rychner and later by Erwin Jaeckle himself.

=== Political positions and public controversies ===
Just as Jaeckle had uncompromisingly opposed National Socialism, after the war he fought against the proscription of what he saw as alleged National Socialist sympathizers such as Hans Konrad Sonderegger, Gustav Däniker, Eugen Bircher and Robert F. Denzler or Grock as well as "purges" or expulsions of Germans such as Bernard von Brentano and insisted on strict adherence to the law. In 1945, the Zurich government council banned a concert by Wilhelm Furtwängler with the Tonhalle-Orchester Zürich for fear of disturbances, after the Labor Party in the municipal council had interpellated the city council as to whether it intended to allow the concert by the "Prussian State Council". Jaeckle also strongly criticized this.

His liberal attitude was also reflected in his rejection of the banning of communist and fascist parties during the Second World War. He was of the opinion that the Swiss did not need such protective measures because he considered their "inherited legal concepts to be strong and firm." Accordingly, he also opposed the so-called Jesuit article, i.e. the ban on the Jesuit order and generally on the establishment or re-establishment of monasteries that had been included in the Swiss constitution since 1874 (The corresponding articles were removed from the constitution in a referendum in 1973). On the other hand, he was in favor of the death penalty for treason introduced in the Military Penal Code in 1940 (It was abolished in 1992).

=== Military and cultural policy positions ===
As a member of the National Council, Jaeckle unsuccessfully campaigned for an unrestricted ban on the export of weapons. However, he was successful with his demand that Swiss soldiers be issued with sealed pocket ammunition for storage at home so that they would be ready to fight immediately in the event of war. In general, a strong army was an important concern for him, and he vehemently opposed the development of aircraft. In 1949, he achieved an increase in contributions to Pro Helvetia, which was founded in the same year as the Tat daily newspaper. In 1952, he initiated the abolition of further subsidies for Holzverzuckerungs AG, which later became Ems-Chemie, with a postulate that was initially rejected. The abolition of the subsidy was then approved in a referendum on May 13, 1956.

=== Relationship with Gottlieb Duttweiler ===
Jaeckle's relationship with the authoritarian, eruptive Gottlieb Duttweiler was not without conflict. The latter, who as an entrepreneur was more interested in economic issues and had never done military service, accused him of never making any advances on the country's major problems. Jaeckle, who was more interested in cultural issues and, as an officer, in military matters, was offended by this. Duttweiler also regularly threatened to close down the newspaper during these frequent disputes. He called Jaeckle the thread on which Die Tat was hanging.

After leaving the National Council in 1962, Erwin Jaeckle rarely expressed his political views and, following the resignation of Max Rychner in the same year, devoted himself increasingly to the management of Literarische Tat, his literary passions and genealogical studies of his family. He retired at the end of May 1971, but remained in charge of Literarische Tat until the daily newspaper ceased publication in 1977. After that, he made no secret of his disdain for the new tabloid under the same name.

=== Later years and retirement ===
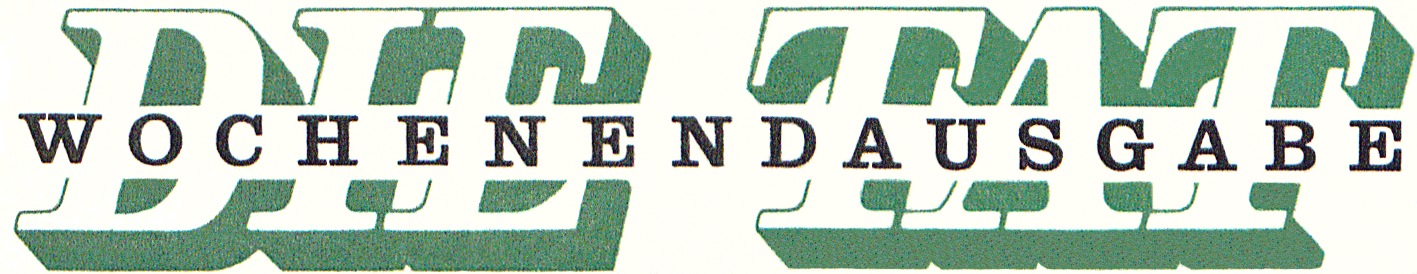
Logo of the weekend edition of Die Tat. The " green Tat" contained Die Literarische Tat and could be subscribed to separately.

In 1972, the new editor-in-chief Walter Biel redesigned the Tat. The newspaper head became red, only the weekend edition remained the "green Tat". The front page now featured the most important events from all departments and an illustrated " daily news" instead of just foreign news as before. The layout was changed from four to five columns.

Die Tat had a circulation of over 40,000 copies before and during the Second World War and around 35,000 copies afterwards, making it the third-largest political daily newspaper in German-speaking Switzerland. However, it was never profitable, partly because its proximity to Migros meant that it did not receive any brand advertisements. The decline of the political press in the 1970s also led to a reduction in circulation to only around 25,000 copies by 1976.

The successors of Gottlieb Duttweiler (who died in 1962) at Migros, for whom the newspaper was "too elitist" and generated too little response, were ultimately no longer willing to bear the resulting increasing losses, although in 1974 they decided to continue publishing Die Tat for at least five years. Charles Linsmayer and Alfred A. Häsler asked the publisher in a petition signed by 153 personalities from the worlds of culture, science, politics and business, including Friedrich Traugott Wahlen, Hans-Peter Tschudi and Siegfried Unseld, to at least continue Literarische Tat in a suitable manner. On April 1, 1977, the last issue of Die Tat appeared in its previous form. Biel became Director of Economic Policy at the Migros-Genossenschafts-Bund.

== Tabloid (1977–1978) ==
Tat
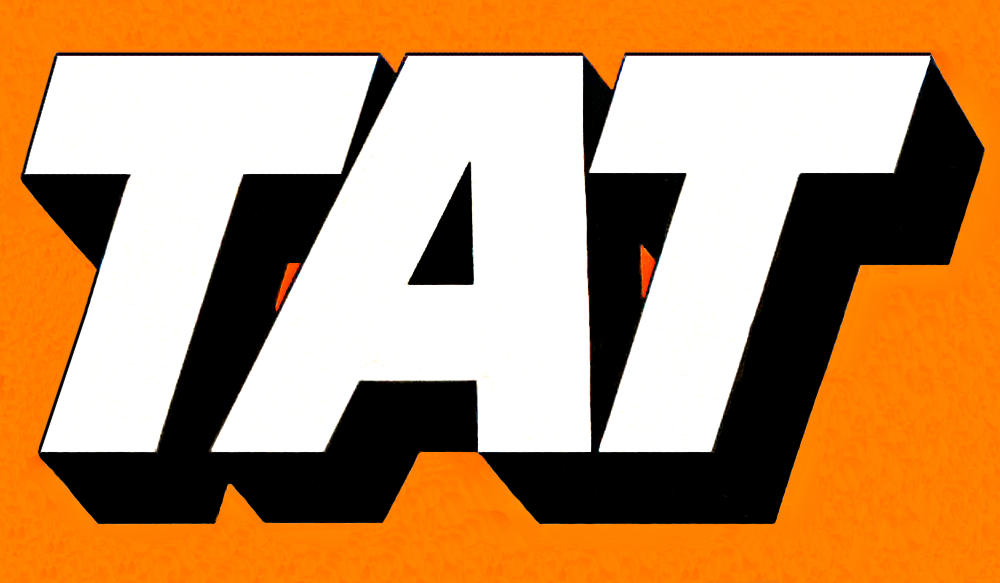
- Editor-in-chief: Roger Schawinski (1977-1978) Gerd Klinner (1978) Karl Vögeli (appointed in 1978, but unable to take up the position due to the closure of the newspaper)
- Editor: Migros
- Founded: April 4, 1977
- Ceased publication: September 25, 1978
- Country: Switzerland

The president of the Migros administrative delegation at the time, Pierre Arnold, wanted to replace the daily newspaper with an aggressive but factual "tabloid newspaper of a high standard" (without "sex and crime"). A few years earlier, however, a project with similar aspirations in the form of the Neue Presse had failed. Arnold was able to convince the 26-member board of his project by a very narrow margin of 12 to 11 members. The new newspaper was to focus on consumer protection, with the aim of achieving a circulation of 80,000 copies in one year and being financially self-supporting in three years.

In order to make the significantly higher circulation and four-color printing possible, it was necessary to set up a printing plant in Spreitenbach, Limmatdruck AG, in a very short space of time. The original plan was to publish the new Tat as early as the end of 1976, also as an daily newspaper, but Schawinski, who had been working for Migros since the beginning of 1977, successfully resisted this move.

=== Editorial team ===
Under editor-in-chief Roger Schawinski, Migros assembled a largely new and expanded editorial team for the launch of the tabloid newspaper in 1977. The staff included journalists Kurt W. Zimmermann, Urs P. Gasche, Peter Knechtli, Hanspeter Thür, Fredy Hämmerli, and Gerd Klinner, who had previously served as editor of the daily newspaper from 1969 to 1972.

Several editors joined from the daily newspaper, including deputy editor-in-chief and features editor Ulrich Doerfel, foreign affairs editor Herbert Tauber, and local affairs editor Albin Minder. Local editor Silvio Kippe was also expected to join the newspaper, but left before publication.

=== New format and investigative journalism ===
On April 4, 1977, Tat appeared for the first time in a new layout, in half-format, and was the first national newspaper in Switzerland to be printed in four colors. As a morning newspaper published Monday to Saturday, it competed with Blick. According to its own figures, it had a circulation of 70,000 copies and a reach of over 200,000 readers.

The newspaper subsequently became known, among other things, for uncovering the so-called Chiasso scandal at Schweizerische Kreditanstalt SKA (now Credit Suisse), which Tat' called "SKAndal".

=== Editorial style and financial difficulties ===
However, the newspaper's aggressive style, sometimes also towards Migros, soon led to fierce criticism from a growing number of members of the administration, who also referred to numerous expressions of displeasure from cooperative members.

In addition, the annual deficits of 8 to 12 million Swiss francs far exceeded the targets and a balanced account, as demanded by Arnold for a period that had now been extended to five years, no longer seemed achievable.

=== Management intervention ===
Arnold finally demanded that Schawinski dismiss two or three activists from the works group of the left-wing SJU union, including Hanspeter Bürgin in particular, whom he considered to be mainly responsible for the newspaper's economically critical, sharp course. When Schawinski refused, Arnold dismissed him without notice on July 26, 1978. He gave the editorial team clear guidelines for their work, which were intended to bring about a change in the style of the newspaper, but not, in his opinion, an actual change of course. Bürgin then left the newspaper of his own accord.

Arnold appointed the previous deputy editor-in-chief Gerd Klinner as editor-in-chief. Klinner initially accepted the position, but then rejected it after consulting with the editorial team, who demanded that Schawinski be reinstated as editor-in-chief. Pierre Arnold refused and asked the editorial team to appoint two other editors alongside Klinner to form an interim three-man editorial team. The editorial team chose Urs P. Gasche and Karl Biffiger.

=== Editorial statute and consultation disputes ===
At the same time, however, it demanded an editorial statute that would guarantee the continuation of the previous direction. However, it was not possible to agree on an editorial statute in which Migros wanted to include its "guidelines" in subsequent discussions

The editorial statutes of the Tat stipulated that the editorial staff should be consulted "before all important questions", although Migros had not signed them (although in the opinion of the editorial staff they had "verbally approved" them) and Arnold therefore did not feel bound by them. .

Arnold had also given verbal and written assurances that he would recognize the 1972 collective agreement (previously the "Baden Agreement", now the collective employment agreement) between the Association of Journalists and the Newspaper Publishers' Association, which also stipulated the obligation to consult the editorial team before making important decisions.

However, as a non-association member, Migros was not bound by the collective agreement either.

=== Strike and closure ===
On September 19, 1978, Arnold appointed Karl Vögeli, the editor-in-chief of Blick, as the new editor-in-chief without consulting the editorial team, with the task of enforcing Migros' guidelines in the editorial office.

The latter reacted on 22 September 1978 "in complete misjudgement of its position of power" (Schawinski) with a strike in which all 56 editorial employees organized in the SJU took part and protested against Vögeli's appointment, which had been made without consulting them.

Five editors who were not organized in the SJU (including Klinner and Gasche from the transitional editorial team, who had resigned in the meantime) protested against the strike and accused the strikers of endangering jobs, including technical ones.

This meant that on Saturday, September 23, 1978, for the first time in Swiss press history, a newspaper was not published due to a strike by the editorial staff.

Migros gave the editorial staff a written ultimatum to resume work by Friday evening, which was later extended to Saturday noon. If the request was not complied with, the letter would be regarded as termination without notice. The editorial team let the ultimatum expire unused.

Migros then immediately confirmed the immediate dismissal of the approximately 40 striking editors, who were not prepared to resume work, and locked them out by changing the door locks. The editors subsequently published seven issues of a strike newspaper, Die Wut, in the cooperative print shop for around a month with the same layout as the strike and a circulation of 80,000 to 100,000 copies.

On Monday, September 25, 1978, Migros carried out its threat and ceased publication of the newspaper. Vögeli became head of the New Media department at the Migros-Genossenschafts-Bund.

=== Aftermath ===
In an "open letter to Swiss newspaper readers" published in the Neue Zürcher Zeitung on September 27, 1978, among others, Arnold justified Migros' actions. The appointment of an editor-in-chief was the sole responsibility of the publisher. If the editorial team had the right of co-determination, no serious applicant would apply because they would run the risk of losing their current job if their application became known through indiscretions. Such indiscretions had indeed occurred in previous cases.

The striking editors initially continued with the publication of Die Wut and a variety of actions. On October 19, 1978, Migros reached an agreement with the VPOD trade union, to which SJU belonged as one of its sections, to pay the wages of the editors who had been dismissed without notice until the end of the year and to waive claims for damages. For its part, the VPOD agreed to withdraw the initiated judicial assessment of the justification of the dismissals without notice and to discontinue the strike newspaper Die Wut, in which Arnold's address and telephone number had been published.

== List of editors and editorial staff ==
=== Weekly newspaper (1935–1939) ===
==== Editors-in-chief ====
- Hermann Walder: 1935–1937
- Eugen Theodor Rimli: 1937–1939
- Willy Aerni: 1939

=== Daily newspaper (1939–1977) ===
==== Editors in charge and editors-in-chief ====
- Max Rychner: 1939–1943
- Erwin Jaeckle: 1943–1971
- Walter Biel: 1971–1977

==== Well-known editors ====
- Hans Munz: 1941–1944
- Fritz René Allemann: 1942–1967
- Alfred Grütter: 1942–1964
- Roman Brodmann: 1943–1949
- Karl Heinrich David: 1944–1951
- Hans Fleig: 1948–1961
- Alfred A. Häsler: 1958–1977
- Hans Neuburg: 1967–1977

==== Other well-known editors and editorial staff ====
- Erich Brock
- Elisabeth Brock-Sulzer
- Alfred Gilgen
- Henry "Heiri" Gysler
- Fritz Güttinger
- Gertrud Heinzelmann
- Gustav René Hocke
- Robert Jungk
- Charles Linsmayer
- Herbert Lüthy
- Georges-Henri Martin
- Hans Mayer
- Armin Mohler
- Walter Muschg
- Hermann Scherchen
- Edgar Schumacher
- Adrien Turel
- Gösta von Uexküll
- Ernst Walter

=== Tabloid (1977–1978) ===
==== Editors-in-chief ====
- Roger Schawinski: 1977–1978
- Gerd Klinner (a. i.): 1978
- Karl Vögeli: 1978

== Bibliography ==
- Billerbeck, Ewald; et al. (collaboration) (1978). Liquidiert. Erstmals streikte in der Schweiz eine Zeitungsredaktion (in German). Vol. 7. Zurich: Lenos. ISBN 3857870605.
- Erwin, Jaeckle (1979). Niemandsland der Dreissigerjahre (in German). Zurich: Verlag Hans Rohr. ISBN 3858650919.
- Jaeckle, Erwin (1989). Erinnerungen an «Die Tat». 1943–1971 (in German). Zurich: Verlag Hans Rohr. ISBN 3858650927.
- Meier, Pirmin (2009). Lerne das Leben und lebe das Lernen. Ausblick auf den Autor, Publizisten und Privatgelehrten Erwin Jaeckle (1909–1997) zum 100. Geburtstag (in German). Zürich: Stiftung für Abendländische Ethik und Kultur. ISBN 9783033021358.
- Schawinski, Roger (2014). "Tat". Wer bin ich? (in German). Zurich: Kein & Aber. ISBN 9783036956930.
- Bollinger, Ernst (November 14, 2022). "Die Tat". Historisches Lexikon der Schweiz (in German).
