= Migros Magazine =

- Editor: Sabine Eva Wittwer
- Format: tabloid
- Unpaid circulation: 1 350 639
- Founder: Schweizer Wochenzeitung
- Founded: 1942 (as Wir Brückenbauer)
- Company: Migros-Genossenschafts-Bund
- Country: Switzerland
- Language: German
- Website: migrosmagazin.ch

Migros Magazine is a weekly free newspaper of the Swiss retail group Migros. Previously, the magazine Wir Brückenbauer, founded by Migros founder Gottlieb Duttweiler in 1942 and published by the Federation of Migros Cooperatives, was subtitled "Wochenblatt des Sozialkapital" (also called: Bridge Builder).

== History ==
=== Foundation (1942) ===
Gottlieb Duttweiler established publishing channels for Migros early on. It started in 1925 with a leaflet titled Migros – die Brücke ("Migros – the Bridge"), which appeared every three to four weeks. From December 1927, Duttweiler placed text advertisements in several newspapers. This "newspaper within a newspaper" appeared a total of 727 times. In November 1935, Duttweiler founded the newspaper Die Tat, which was first published weekly and, from October 1939, as an evening newspaper.

When Duttweiler converted Migros into a cooperative in 1941, he applied to the Federal Department of Justice and Police to establish a weekly newspaper for the cooperative members. The launch was not approved until 21 July 1942. Shortly thereafter, on 30 July 1942, the first issue of Wir Brückenbauer was published. Duttweiler was a member of the editorial committee of the new newspaper.

With this publication, Migros could better convey a "Migros spirit" to members than through the "newspaper within a newspaper." During World War II, this meant, among other things, that the federal government's supply policies were commented on from its own perspective, and a sense of community was built and maintained. In his editorial in the first issue, Duttweiler wrote: "A state of everyday life must be created that will be in accordance with the words: 'We are one single people of brothers.' Back to federal principles, up to a Christianity in everyday life—that is the task of material and spiritual social capital and especially of our organ 'Wir Brückenbauer.'."

In the following years, Brückenbauer expanded reader engagement with various sections such as letters to the editor, competitions, advisory services, reader trips, and surveys. Different social classes were portrayed, and the marketing of Migros products, which remained inexpensive even during the war, contributed to reader loyalty during the crisis period. Particularly popular were the advisory service and competitions, where readers could submit text and image contributions The circulation increased in the first years from 110,000 copies in the summer of 1942 to 200,000 copies in 1950. The most important growth factor, besides reader loyalty, was the free membership in the cooperative.

=== Redesign (1987) ===
In 1987, the newspaper was redesigned: Brückenbauer now appeared in full color and in tabloid format. Content changes were also made. On 25 March 1987, a new section called the "Search Corner" was introduced, initially under the title "He who seeks, finds." Later, it was called "One of you surely knows...". The Search Corner became a "real hit" with the audience, as the newspaper wrote in May 1987: "So many people and things from the past want to be found again—and in our large readership, surely someone remembers in each case".

Over 1,000 search queries appeared per year. Most concerned friends lost from sight from school, vocational training, or military service, but also forgotten song lyrics, poems, or hobby items. The submissions, which were published with or without photos, often expressed a return to the supposedly lost village way of life. The introduction of a conservative section for reader engagement corresponded to the dominant marketing theme at the time, the "value change," as mentioned in the Migros annual report of 1987. These changes were perceived by Migros as both an opportunity and a threat. On one hand, the section provided an identity-forming memory depot in times of new crises; on the other, the return to the past also strengthened individual learning for the future.

=== Renaming (2004) ===
On May 25, 2004, the name of the newspaper was changed to Migros magazine in order to clarify the relationship to Migros again after the old symbolism of the retailer as a “bridge builder” between producers and consumers was forgotten. The "we" made the community clear and was supposed to build the “bridge” between producer and consumer. [11]

The renaming came at a stage in the renewal of Migros, which also included the revision of the statutes of November 9, 2002 and the accompanying structural reform as well as the new mission statement from 2003. [12] In the editorial, Anton Scherrer, President of the MGB Directorate General, wrote: "The new magazine should reflect the fresh, modern Migros - without neglecting current social, political and economic issues." Associated with this was a more reader-friendly design of the structure and the enlargement of the typography.

=== Characteristics today ===
As of 2024, Migros Magazine is printed every week on Mondays in just under one and a half million copies and sent free of charge within Switzerland to members of a Migros cooperative as well as to customers with the "Cumulus" customer card. The newspaper is also available free of charge to everyone in all larger Migros stores. In 2022/23, it had a WEMF-certified circulation of 1,477,714 distributed copies and a reach of 2.235 million readers (WEMF, MACH Basic 2024-1).

The largest competitor of Migros Magazine is the Coopzeitung, a weekly paper published on Tuesdays by the major distributor Coop, which has even higher circulation and reader numbers. The Neue Zürcher Zeitung calls the two newspapers the "silent giants" of the Swiss media landscape and says of their journalistic work: "Apparently, the consumer segment takes pleasure in majority-compatible everyday and lifestyle topics as well as politically balanced background reports".

The Migros Magazine website was completely revised in summer 2017. The user is now at the center of the website. It can be personalized; users can follow individual authors or topics, and they can submit their own articles, which appear on the same level as the editorial team and can also be printed in the print edition. In 2017, the website (German/French) achieved an annual average of approximately 546,000 visits, 282,000 unique clients, and approximately 2.5 million page impressions according to Net-Metrix figures. Responsible for this was the then online department head Reto Vogt.

The column by Bänz Friedli, which had appeared since 2005, was discontinued at the end of November 2019. Migros also terminated its membership in the Swiss Media Association at the end of 2019.

At the beginning of 2024, the magazine was placed within the marketing communication department of Migros Supermarket AG. Since 26 February 2024, the magazine has appeared in a new layout. Editor-in-chief Franz Ermel left Migros at the end of June 2024, and Sabine Eva Wittwer became his successor.

=== Editions in other languages ===
In French-speaking Switzerland, the weekly Migros newspaper was first published in French under the title Pionnier Migros, then as Construire, until it was renamed Migros Magazine in 2004 in analogy to the German-language edition. It reaches a WEMF-certified edition of 504,700 (previous year 507,257) copies, and a reach of 660,000 (previous year 662,000) readers (WEMF MACH Basic 2018-II). The Migros Cooperative of the Canton of Ticino publishes an Italian- language weekly called Azione; this was not renamed. It reaches a WEMF-certified circulation of 101,634 (previous year 102,022) copies.

== Bibliography ==
- Beat Grossrieder: "Strong Sense of 'We' for Difficult Times. The 'Brückenbauer' Between Customer Loyalty and Crisis Management", in: Katja Girschik, Albrecht Ritschl, Thomas Welskopp (eds.): Der Migros-Kosmos. Zur Geschichte eines aussergewöhnlichen Schweizer Unternehmens (The Migros Cosmos. The story of an exceptional Swiss company) hier+jetzt, Baden 2003, ISBN 3-906419-64-9, pp. 203–219.
