= Juan Gasparini =

- Born: Juan Gaspari; April 30, 1949 (age 77); Azul, Argentina
- Occupation: Journalist
- Notable credit: Books
- Website: http://www.juangasparini.com

Juan Gasparini (born 1949 in Azul, Buenos Aires) is an Argentinian investigative journalist and author.

He has press cards in the Association of Correspondents of the United Nations.

== Journalistic Books: Investigations and trials (1986-2009) ==
=== In Argentina ===
- La Pista Suiza (1986) Buenos Aires, Lectorum Pubns Inc. ISBN 950-600-080-8
- Montoneros: Final De Cuentas, Buenos Aires, Puntosur Editores, (1988). ISBN 950-9889-19-9
- El crimen de Graiver (1990, Europa: Zeta ISBN 950-699-025-5 reedited as David Graiver – El banquero de los Montoneros), 2007, Norma ISBN 987-545-419-2
- La Injusticia Federal: El Ocultamiento de los Jueces y la historia negra de la SIDE en los sobornos del Senado (2005) Buenos Aires: Edhasa ISBN 950-9009-31-8
- La Fuga del Brujo: Historia criminal de José López Rega (2005) Buenos Aires: Norma ISBN 987-545-229-7
- Manuscrito de un desaparecido en la ESMA. El libro de Jorge Caffatti (2006) Buenos Aires: Norma ISBN 987-545-378-1
- El pacto Menem+Kirchner (2009) Buenos Aires: Sudamericana ISBN 978-950-07-3051-8

=== In Spain ===
- Después de la tormenta, las claves de la posguerra (1991, collective work after the first Gulf War);
- Roldán-Paesa, la conexión suiza (1997, corruption in Spain and Switzerland); after word to the Spanish edition on Nazi Gold (1997) (L'or nazi), a book by Jean Ziegler, contribution on networks of laundering dirty money of the Nazi dictatorship in Spain, Portugal and Argentina; Spain: Akal ISBN 84-460-0817-3
- Borges: la posesión póstuma (2000, the last days of Argentine writer Jorge Luis Borges in Geneva, translated into French by Éditions Timéli of Geneva in 2006); España: Softcover, Foca Ediciones y Distribuciones ISBN 84-95440-10-5
- Mujeres de dictadores (2002, portraits of women of Augusto Pinochet, Fidel Castro, Alberto Fujimori, Ferdinand Marcos, Jorge Videla and Slobodan Milosevic), the latter two also being distributed in Latin America. Mexico: Océano ISBN 84-8307-497-4

=== Co-author ===
with Norberto Bermúdez

- El testigo secreto (Argentina-Spain, 1999, on the Spanish judge Baltasar Garzón) and, España: Javier Vergara Editor ISBN 950-15-1988-0
- La prueba (2001, corruption in Argentina); España: Javier Vergara Editor ISBN 950-15-2252-0
- La delgada línea blanca (2000) with Rodrigo de Castro. Europa: Ediciones B, Grupo Zeta ISBN 950-15-2221-0

== Literary Awards ==
- Rodolfo Walsh price for literature non-fiction (2001)

In the international contest Semana Negra of Gijón, Spain, with Rodrigo de Castro, for the book La delgada línea blanca, investigation into Pinochet’s dictatorship in Chile and links with Argentina

- Price Nicolas Bouvier Media (2007)

In the contest’s 10th anniversary of the Swiss Club de la Presse in Geneva with Carole Vann. For investigative journalism on confidential reports to the United Nations of violations of human rights in Iran and Uzbekistan, French and English, in the website Tribune of Human Rights in the newspapers Le Temps and Le Courrier.

== See also ==
- Paulina Veloso
- United Nations Human Rights Council
