= Swiss literature =

As there is no dominant national language, the four main languages of French, Italian, German and Romansh form the four branches which make up a literature of Switzerland. The original Swiss Confederation, from its foundation in 1291 up to 1798, gained only a few French-speaking districts in what is now the Canton of Fribourg, and so the German language dominated. During that period the Swiss vernacular literature was in German, although in the 18th century, French became fashionable in Bern and elsewhere. At that time, Geneva and Lausanne were not yet Swiss: Geneva was an ally and Vaud a subject land. The French branch does not really begin to qualify as Swiss writing until after 1815, when the French-speaking regions gained full status as Swiss cantons. The Italian and Romansch-Ladin branches are less prominent.

Like the earlier charters of liberties, the original League of 1291 was drawn up in Latin. Later alliances among the cantons, as well as documents concerning the whole Confederation—the Parsons Ordinance of 1370, the Sempach Ordinance of 1393, the Compact of Stans (1481) and all the Recesses of the Diets—were compiled in German. Political documents are not necessarily literature, but these pre-Reformation alliances rested on popular consent, and were expressed in vernacular German rather than in clerkly Latin.

== Swiss-German literature ==
=== Emergence of vernacular literature ===
First in order of date are the Minnesingers, the number of whom in the districts that ultimately formed part of the medieval Swiss Confederation are said to have exceeded thirty. Zürich then (as now) was the chief literary centre of the Confederation. The two Manesses (father and son) collected a number of their songs in a manuscript that has happily come down to us and is preserved in Paris. The most prominent was Master John Hadlaub, who flourished in the second half of the 13th and the first quarter of the 14th centuries. Next we have a long series of war songs, celebrating the victories of the Swiss. One of the earliest and most famous of these was composed by Hans Halbsuter of Lucerne to commemorate the battle of Sempach (1386), not far from his native town. There are other similar songs for the victory of Näfels (1388) and those of the battle of Grandson and battle of Morat (both 1476) in the Burgundian War. In the 14th century the Dominican friar Ulrich Boner of Bern versified a number of old fables.

More important are the historical chronicles. In the 14th century we have Christian Kuchlmaster's continuation of the annals of the famous monastery of St Gall, in the early 15th century the rhymed chronicle of the war between the Appenzellers and the abbot of St Gall, and rather later in the same century the chronicles of Conrad Justinger of Bern and Hans Fründ (died 1469) of Lucerne, besides the fantastical chronicle of Strattligen and a scarcely less fanciful poem on the supposed Scandinavian descent of the men of Schwyz and of Ober Hasle, both by Elogius Kiburger (died 1506) of Berne.

In the 15th century, too, we have the White Book of Sarnen and the first William Tell song, which gave rise to the well-known legend, as well as the rather later play named the Urnerspiel dealing with the same subject. The Burgundian War witnessed a great outburst of historical ardour in the shape of chronicles written by Diebold Schilling (died 1486) of Bern, by Melchior Russ (died 1499), Diebold Schilling the Younger (d. between 1516 and 1523) and Petermann Etterlin (died 1509), all three of Lucerne as well as by Gerold Edlibach (died 1530) of Zürich, and by Johnanes Lenz (died 1541) of Brugg. In the vernacular, too, are the earliest descriptions of the Confederation, those by Albert von Bonstetten of Einsiedeln (1479) and by Conrad Turst of Zürich (1496), to whom also we owe the first map of the country (1495–1497).

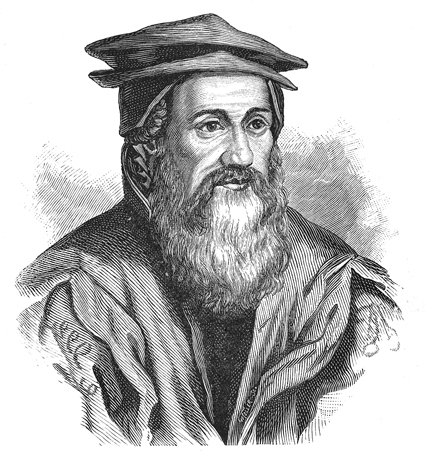
Conrad Gessner

The Swiss humanists wrote in Latin, as did also the Swiss Reformers, at any rate for the most part, though the Zurich Bible of 1531 is an exception. Nicholas Manuel (1484–1530), a multisided Bernese, composed satirical poems in German against the pope, while Valerius Anshelm (died 1540), also of Bern, wrote one of the best Swiss chronicles. Aegidius Tschudi of Glarus, despite great literary activity, published but a single German work in his lifetime, the Uralt warhafflig Alpisch Rhaetia sam pt dem Tract der anderen Alpgebirgen (1538) besides his map of Switzerland (same date). Sebastian Munster, who was a Swiss by adoption, published (1544) his Cosmographia in German, the work being translated into Latin in 1550. But the multisided Conrad Gesner, a born Swiss, wrote all his works in Latin, German translations appearing only at a later date.

The first important original product in German was the remarkable and elaborate history and description of Switzerland, issued in 1548 at Zürich by Johannes Stumpf of that town. But Josias Simler, who was in a way his continuator, wrote all his works, theological and geographical, in Latin. Matthew Merian engraved multiple plates, which were issued in a series of volumes (1642–1688) under the general title of Topographia, the earliest volume describing Switzerland, while all had a text in German by an Austrian, Martin Zeiller. Characteristic of the age are the autobiography of the Valais scholar Thomas Platter (1499–1582) and the diary of his still more distinguished son Felix (1536–1614), both written in German, though not published till long after.

Gradually Swiss historical writers gave up the use of Latin for their native tongue, so Michael Stettler (1580–1642) of Bern, Franz Haffner (1609–1671) of Soleure, and quite a number of Grisons authors (though the earliest in date, Ulrich Campell of Süs, c. 1509–c. 1582, still clung to Latin), such as Bartholomäus Anhorn (1566–1640) and his son of the same name (1616–1670) and Johannes Guler von Wyneck (1562–1637). Fortunat Sprecher (1585–1647) preferred to write his Pallas raetica in Latin, as did Fortunat von Juvalta (1567–1654?) in the case of his autobiography. The autobiography of Hans Ardser of Davos (1557-post 1614) and the amusing dialogue between the Niesen and the Stockhorn by Hans Rudolf Rebmann (1566–1605) are both in German. Jean-Baptiste Plantin (1625–1697) wrote his description of Switzerland in Latin, Helvetia nova et antiqua (1656), but Johann Jacob Wagner's (1641–1695) guide to Switzerland is in German, despite its titles Inder memorabilium Helvetiae (1684) and Mercurius Helveticus (1688), though he issued his scientific description of his native land in Latin, Historia naturalis Helvetiae curiosa (1680).

=== Eighteenth century ===
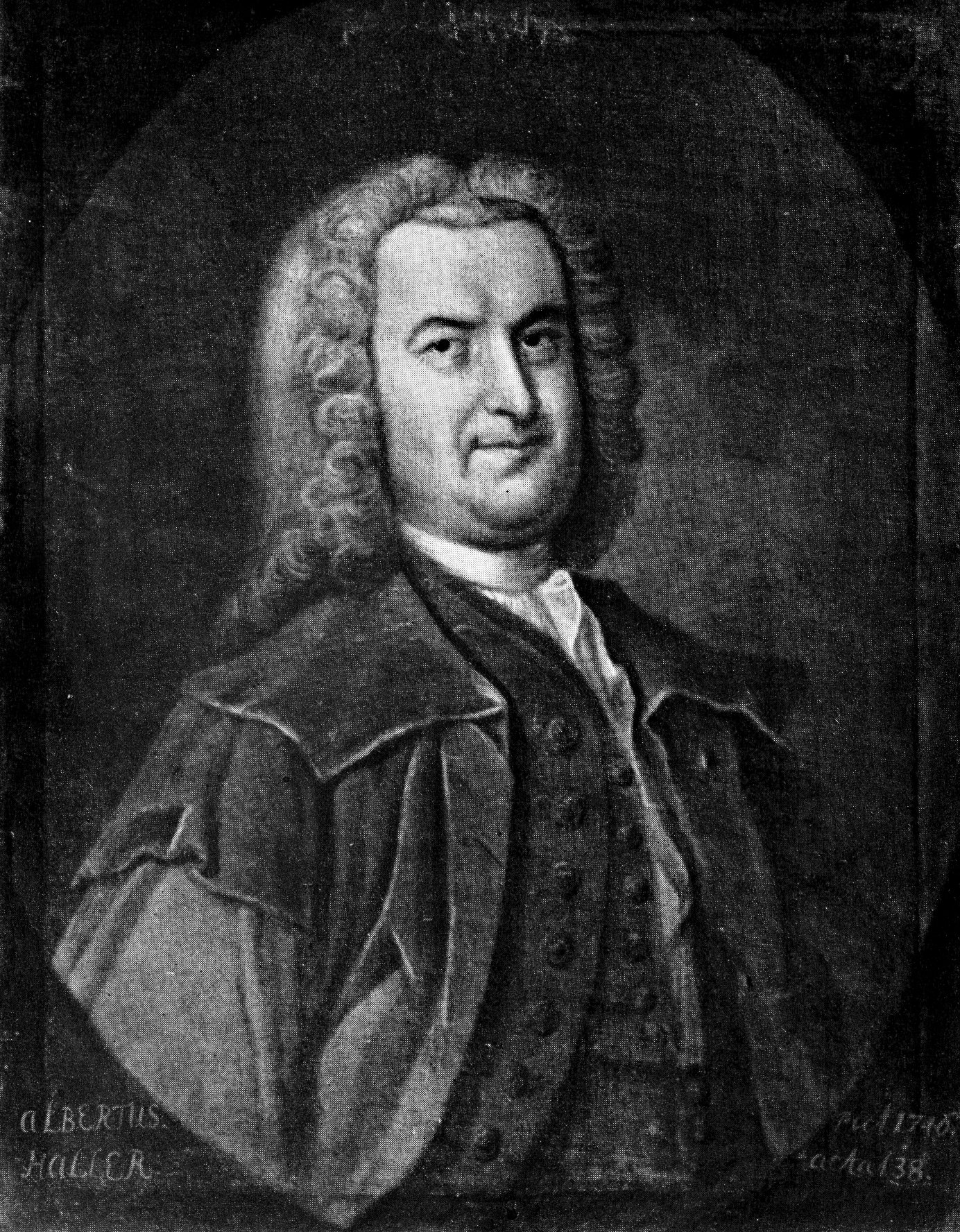
Albrecht von Haller

In the 18th century the intellectual movement in Switzerland greatly developed, though it was naturally strongly influenced by local characteristics. Basel, Bern and especially Zürich were the chief literary centres. Basel was particularly distinguished for its mathematicians, such as Leonhard Euler (1707–1783), and three members of the Bernoulli family refugees from Antwerp, the brothers Jakob (1654–1705) and Johann (1667–1748), and the latter's son Daniel (1700–1782). But its chief literary glory was Isaac Iselin (1728–1783), one of the founders of the Helvetic Society (1760) and of the Economical Society (1777), and author of a treatise on the philosophy of history entitled Geschichte dee Menschheit (1764), and of another on ideal politics, Philosophische und patriotische Trume eines Menschenfreundes (1755), while a number of his economical tracts appeared (1776–1782) under the general title of Ephemeriden der Menschheit. At Bern Albrecht von Haller, though especially distinguished as a scientific writer, yet by his poem Die Alpen (1732) and his travels in his native country did much to excite and stimulate the love of mountain scenery. Another Bernese, Charles Victor de Bonstetten, is a type of the gallicized Liberal Bernese patrician, while Beat Ludwig von Muralt (1665–1749) analysed the racial characteristics of other nations for the instruction of his fellow-countrymen, his Lettres sur les anglais et les francais (1725) being his principal work. Samuel Wyttenbach (1748–1830) devoted himself to making known the beauties of his country to its natives, travelling much and writing much about his travels. Gottlieb Sigmund Gruner wrote the Eisgebirge des Schweizerlandes (1760), a work describing the ice-clad mountains of Switzerland, though it is rather a useful compilation than an original contribution to knowledge, but a decided advance on his fellow Bernese, Johann Georg Altmanns (1697–1758) Versuch einer historischen und physischen Beschreibung dee helvetischen Eisgebirge (1751). In another department of knowledge a son of Albrecht von Haller, Gottlieb Emmantiel von Haller (1735–1786), compiled a most useful bibliography of writings relating to Swiss history, the Bibliothek dee Schweizergeschichte (6 vols, 1784–1787), that is still indispensable to the historical student.

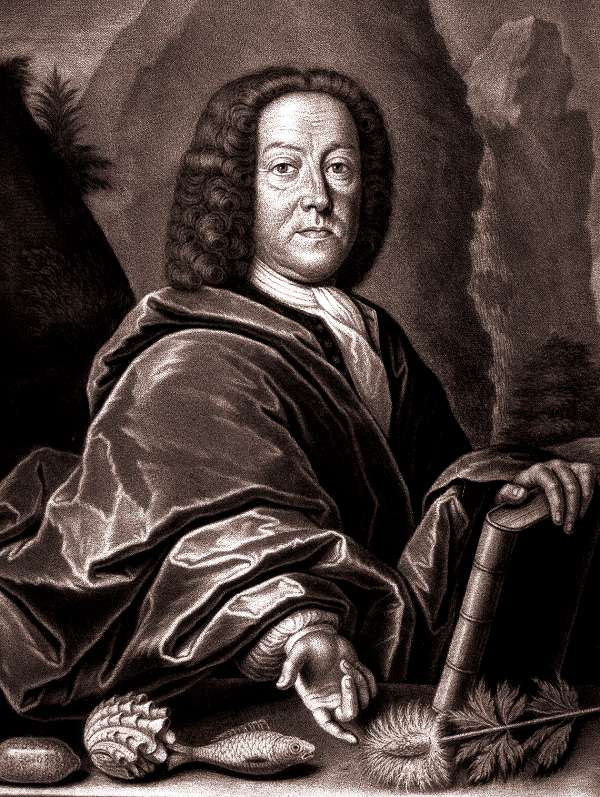
Johann Jakob Scheuchzer

But in the 18th century Zürich was undoubtedly the intellectual and literary capital of German-speaking Switzerland, and gained the title of Athens on the Limmat. One of its earliest and most famous celebrities was JJ Scheuchzer, who travelled much in Switzerland, and wrote much (his travels are described in Latin) as to its natural curiosities, being himself an FRS, and closely associated with Newton and the other English scientific men of the day. But in the purely literary domain the names of JJ Bodmer and of his friend Johann Jakob Breitinger (1701–1776), are the most prominent. By their united exertions the antiquated traditions of German literature were broken down to a large extent, while great praise was bestowed on English poets, Shakespeare, Milton and others. Their views were violently opposed by Gottsched, the leader of the Saxon school, and the controversy that arose forms part of the history of German literature. In 1721–1723 they published jointly the Discourse der Mater, a periodical which spread their views, while more elaborate and systematic expositions of their critical doctrine as to poetry are Bodmer's Kritische Abhandlung von dem Wunderbaren in der Poesie (1740), and Breitinger's Critische Dichtkunst (also in 1740). Their untiring efforts helped to prepare the way for the later outburst of German literature begun by Klopstock, Wieland and Lessing. Another famous Zürich writer was Solomon Gesner, the pastoral poet, and yet another was JK Lavater, now best remembered as a supporter of the view that the face presents a perfect indication of character and that physiognomy may therefore he treated as a science. Other well-known Zürich names are those of JH Pestalozzi (1746–1827), the educationalist, of Johann Caspar Hirzel (1725–1803), another of the founders of the Helvetic Society, and author of Die Wirthschaft eines philosophischen Bauers (1761), and of Johann Georg Sulzer (1720–1779), whose chief work is one on the laws of art or aesthetics, entitled Allgemeine Theorie der schönen Kunste (1771–1774).

Outside the three towns named above there were several writers of German-speaking Switzerland who must be mentioned. One of the best known even now is Johann Georg Zimmermann (1728–1795), whose Betrachtungen fiber die Einsamkeit (1756-1784/1785) profoundly impressed his contemporaries. He, like the fabulist AE Erhlich, was born at Brugg. Johannes von Müller of Schaffhausen, was the first who attempted to write (1780) a detailed history of Switzerland, which, though inspired rather by his love of freedom than by any deep research, was characteristic of his times. JG Ebel was a Swiss by adoption only, but deserves mention as the author of the first detailed guidebook to the country (1793), which held its ground till the days of Murray and Baedeker. A later writer, Heinrich Zschokke (1771–1848), also a Swiss by adoption only, produced (1822) a history of Switzerland written for the people, which had a great vogue.

=== Nineteenth century ===
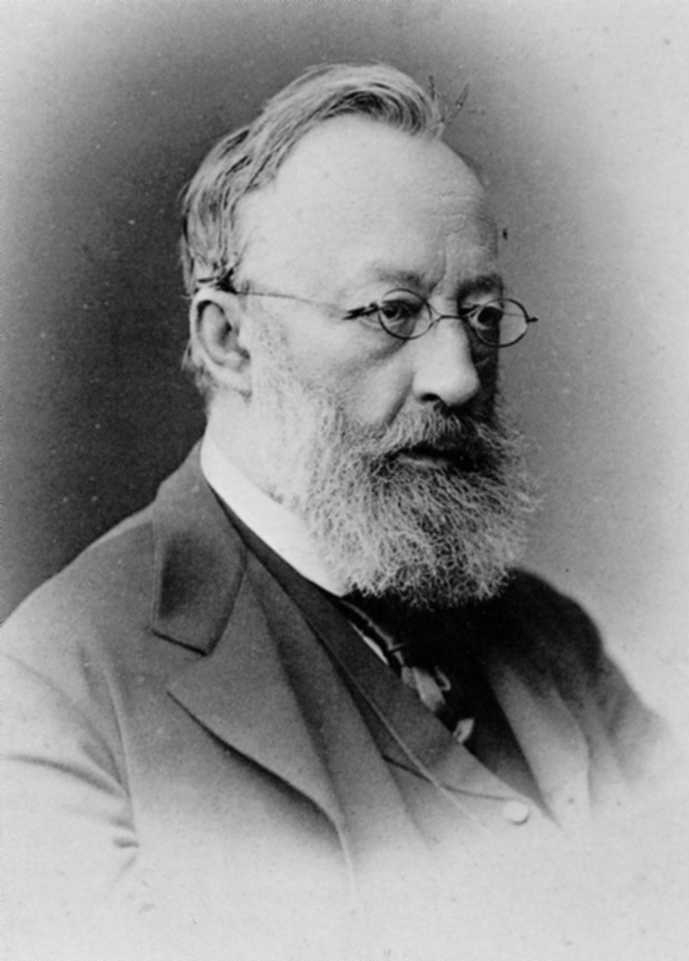
Gottfried Keller

In the later literary history of German-speaking Switzerland three names stand out above all others: Albert Bitzius, known as Jeremias Gotthelf from the first of his tales of peasant life in the Emmenthal, Gottfried Keller, perhaps the most genuinely Swiss poet and novelist of the century, and Conrad Ferdinand Meyer, also a poet and novelist, but of more cosmopolitan leanings and tastes. Jakob Burckhardt was a famous writer on Italian art, while Jakob Frey (1824–1875) continued the work of Bitzius by his tales of Swiss peasant life. Ulrich Hegner (1759–1840) of Winterthur wrote novels full of local colour, as is also the case with David Hess (painter) (1770–1843) in his description of a cure at Baden in Aargau and various tales. Johann Martin Usteri (1763–1827) of Zürich was one of the earliest to write poems in his native dialect.

Later we have a number of Zürich poets or versifiers, some of whose writings have become well known. Such were Heinrich Leuthold (1827–1879), August Corrodi (1826–1885) and Leonhard Widmer (1808–1868), the author of Trittst im Morgenrot daher (1842) (which, set to music by the Cistercian monk Alberic Zwyssig (1808–1854), is now known as the Swiss Psalm), of Es lebt in jeder Schweizerbrust (1842), and Wo Berge sich erheben (1844). To the Bernese poet, Johann Rudolf Wyss (1782–1830), whose father, Johann David Wyss (1743–1818), was the author of the Swiss Family Robinson, we owe the Swiss national anthem, Rufst du mein Vaterland? and the song, Herz, mys Herz, warum so trurig?—while Johann Georg Krauer (1792–1845), of Lucerne, wrote the Rütlilied, Von ferne sei herzlich gegrüßet, and Gottfried Keller himself was responsible for O mein Heimatland. Gottlieb Jakob Kuhn (1775–1845) wrote a number of poems in the Bernese dialect about the Alps and their inhabitants. Less national in sentiment and more metaphysical are the lyrics of Dranmor, the pen-name of the Bernese Ferdinand Schmid (1823–1888).

Among the chief Swiss writers in the department of belles-lettres, novelists, poets, etc., may be mentioned Ernst Zahn, Meinrad Lienert, Arnold Ott, Carl Spitteler, Fritz Marti, Walther Siegfried, Adolf Frey, Hermann Hesse, Jakob Christoph Heer, Joseph Victor Widmann, and Gottfried Strasser.

Isabella Kaiser wrote poems and stories. Johanna Spyri is famous for her children's stories including Heidi, a fictional character living in the Swiss Alps.

=== Twentieth century ===
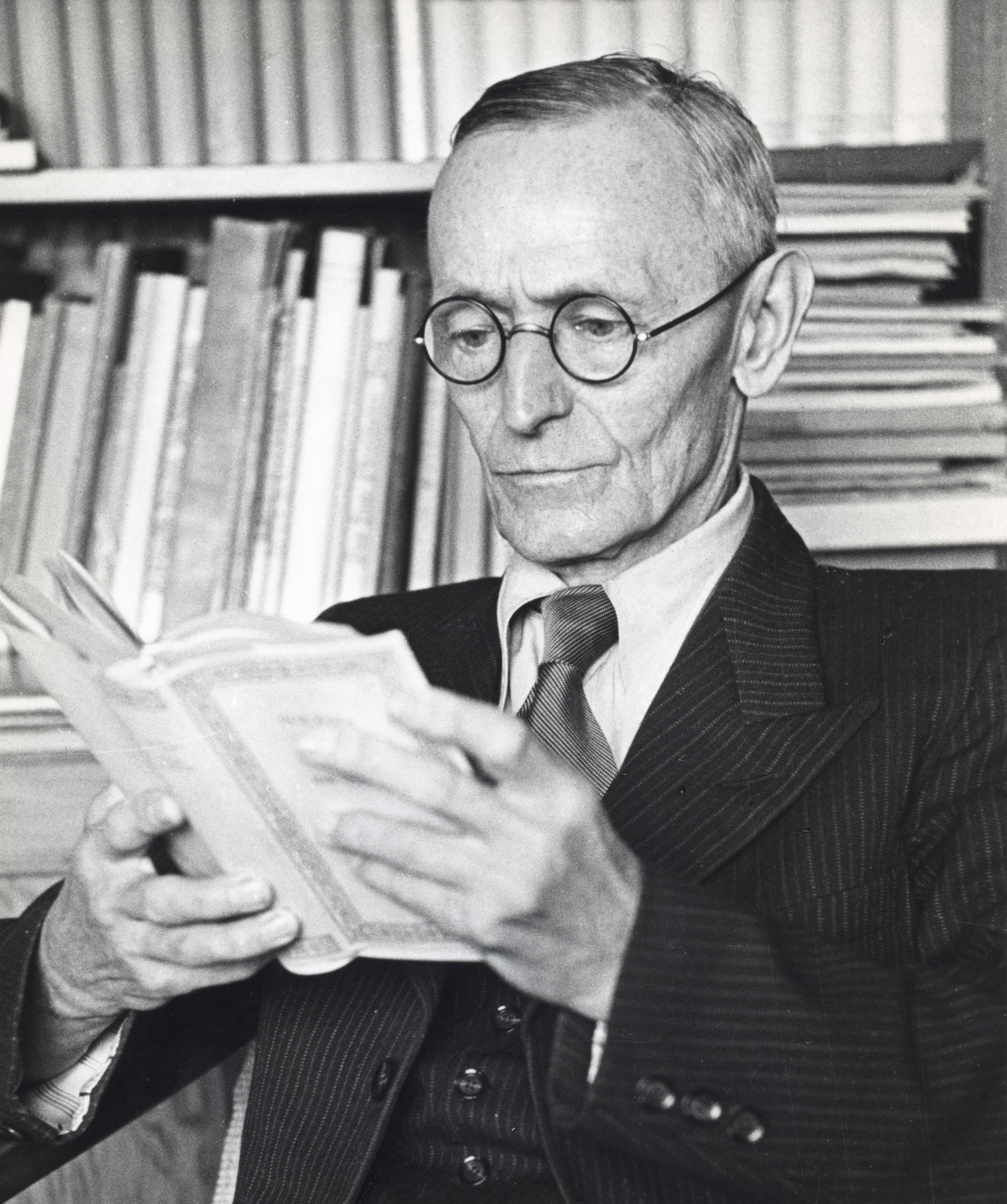
Hermann Hesse

The Nobel Prize for Literature was awarded to Carl Spitteler (1919) and Hermann Hesse (1946). Robert Walser was only decades after his death in 1956 recognized as one of the great modern Swiss novelists at the beginning of the twentieth century. Likewise, a recognition of the works of travel writer and novelist Annemarie Schwarzenbach had to wait almost 50 years after her premature death in 1942.

Friedrich Dürrenmatt was a playwright, author of philosophical crime novels and novellas. Max Frisch was also a playwright, but was famous for being considered the greatest Swiss novelist since Walser. Adolf Muschg is an important essayist, Peter Bichsel and Urs Widmer write stories. Other important Swiss writers are Otto F. Walter and his sister Silja Walter.

Others of note are Melinda Nadj Abonji, Sibylle Berg, Hermann Burger, Erika Burkart, Jürg Federspiel, Lukas Hartmann, Thomas Hürlimann, Franz Hohler, Zoë Jenny, Jürg Laederach, Hugo Loetscher, Kurt Marti, Niklaus Meienberg, Gerhard Meier, Milena Moser, Adolf Muschg, Paul Nizon, Erica Pedretti, Martin Suter, Peter Weber, and Markus Werner.

Writers after 1990 are Peter Stamm, Lukas Bärfuss, Christian Kracht and Alex Capus.

=== Historians ===
Important Swiss historians include:

- Ildefons von Arx (1755–1833), the historian of St Gall, of which he had been a monk,
- J. C. Zellweger (1768–1855), the historian of Appenzell.
- JJ Hottinger (1783–1860), the continuator of J. von Muller's Swiss history,
- Johann Ludwig Wurstemberger (1783–1862) who all four wrote on Bernese history,
- A. von Tillier (1792–1854),
- J. E. Kopp (1793–1866), who rewrote early Swiss history on the basis of authentic documents,
- J. A. Pupikofer (1797–1882), history of the Thurgau
- A. F. Stettler (1796–1849) Swiss constitutional matters
- Johann Kaspar Bluntschli (1808–1881), Swiss constitutional matters,
- E. von Wattenwyl (1815–1890), and
- P. C. von Planta (1815–1902) history of the Grisons
- Georg von Wyß (1816–1893)
- his stepbrother F. von Wyss (1818–1907), a great authority on the legal and constitutional history of Switzerland, and
- A. P. von Segesser (1817–1888), the historian and statesman of Lucerne,
- Jacob Burckhardt (1818–1897), Italian Renaissance
- J. J. Blumer (1819–1875), and
- E. Blusch (1838–1900), the historian of the Protestant churches in German-speaking Switzerland,
- Johannes Dierauer (1842–1920), who wrote the impressive Geschichte der schweizerischen eidgenossenschaft, 2 vo, 1887–91,
- R. Maag (1866–1899), who began the publication of the invaluable Flabsburg terrier of the early 14th century, but had to leave the completion of the work to other competent hands,
- Felix Stähelin (1897–1952), Switzerland in the Roman era

Also: A. Bahl, J. L. Brandstetter, W. Burckhardt, K. Dandliker, R. Durrer, H. Escher, A. Heusler, R. Hoppeler, T. von Liebenau, W. Merz, G Meyer von Knonau, W. F. von Münen, W. Oechsli, J. R. Rahn, L. R. von Salis, P. Schweizer, J. Schollenberger, J. Strickler, R. Thommen, and H. Wartmann.

== Swiss-French literature ==
The knight Othon of Grandson is the earliest figure in the literature of the Suisse romande. He was killed in a judicial duel in 1397, the last scion of his ancient house, and left some amatory poems behind him, while one is extant only in a translation by Chaucer, who makes flattering mention of him. In the 15th and 16th centuries a number of miracle plays in the local Romance dialect were known. The Chronique des chanoines de Neuchâtel was formerly supposed to date from the 15th century, but is now considered by some to be a forgery. More individual and characteristic are the romance about Charlemagne, entitled Fierabras le Giant (1478), by Jean Bagnyon, and the poem named Congé pris du siècle siculier (1480), by Jacques de Bugnin. But the first really prominent personage in this department of literature is François Bonivard (died 1570) who wrote the Chroniques de Geuve that extend down to 1530 and were continued to 1562 by Michel Roset (died 1613). The first Protestant French translation of the Bible was issued at Neuchâtel in 1535, its principal authors being Pierre Robert Olivétan and Pierre de Vingle. As a sort of pendant to the Protestant Bonivard, we have the nun Jeanne de Jussie who in her Levain du Calvinisme (c. 1545) recounts the establishment of Calvinism at Geneva, while the noble Pierre de Pierrefleur in his Mémoires does the same in a lighter and less lachrymose style for Orbe, his native district. Naturally the Reformers of the Suisse Romande used French much in their theological and polemical works. Of more general interest are the writings of two Frenchmen who were driven by religious persecutions to end their lives at Geneva—the memoirs and poems of Theodore Agrippa d'Aubigné (1552–1630), and the historical writings and poems of Simon Goulart (1543–1628). The great deliverance of Geneva from the duke of Savoy, known as the Escalade (1602), was described in prose by David Piaget (1580–1644) in his Histoire de l'escalade and celebrated in verse by Samuel Chappuzeau (1625–1701)--in his Genève délivrée, though the narratives of Goulart and that (published officially by the government) attributed to Jean Sarasin (1574–1632), the author of the Citadin de Genève (1606), are more laconic and more striking. JB Plantin (1625–1697), of Vaud, wrote his topography of Switzerland, Helvetia antiqua et nova (1656), in Latin, but his Abrégé de l'histoire générale de la Suisse (1666) in French, while Georges de Montmollin (1628–1703) of Neuchâtel wrote, besides various works as to local history, Mémoires of his times which have a certain historical value.

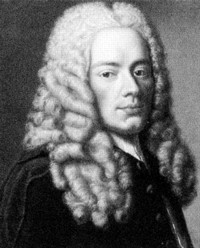
Jean-Jacques Burlamaqui

But the 17th century in the Suisse Romande pales before the glories of the 18th century, which forms its golden age, and was, in a large degree due to the influence of French refugees who, with their families, flocked thither after the Revocation of the Edict of Nantes (1685) and settled down there for the rest of their lives. Such was Louis Bourguet (1678–1743), who, besides his geological works, founded two periodicals which in different ways did much to stimulate the intellectual life of the Suisse Romande; these were the Bibliothèque italique (1729–1734), which aimed at making more widely known the results of Italian research, and the Mercure suisse which, first issued in 1732, lasted till 1784, under different names (rom 1738 onwards the literary section bore the name of Journée helvetique), and secured contributions from most of the leading writers of the Suisse Romande of the day, such as Firmin Abauzit (1679–1767), Abraham Ruchat (1678–1750), and others. Ruchat is now best remembered as the author (under the pen-name of Gottlieb Kypseler) of an excellent guide-book to Switzerland, the Deuces de la Suisse, which first appeared in 1714 and passed through multiple editions, the latest being issued in 1778; but his Histoire de la Reformation de la Suisse (1727–1728) was much esteemed in his day. Another Vaudois historian and antiquary was Charles Guillaume Loys de Bochat (1695–1754) whose Mémoires critiques sur divers points de l'ancienne histoire de la Suisse (1747–1749) still form a treasure-house for archaeologists. Yet a third Lausanne man was JP de Crousaz (1663–1750), who introduced there the philosophy of Descartes, and was, by his books, the master of Gibbon in logic. A French refugee at Lausanne, Jean Barbeyrac (1674–1744), published in 1712 the Droit de la nature et des gens, a translation of Puffendorf's treatise, with a striking preface of his own. A precursor of Montesquieu and of Rousseau was Jean-Jacques Burlamaqui (1694–1750) in his Principes du droit naturel et politique (1747 and 1751, issued together in 1763), while the celebrated international lawyer, Emeric de Vattel (1714–1767), was a native of Neuchâtel by birth and descent, and, though he spent most of his life at foreign courts, died at Neuchâtel, not so very long after the publication of his famous Droit des gens (1758).

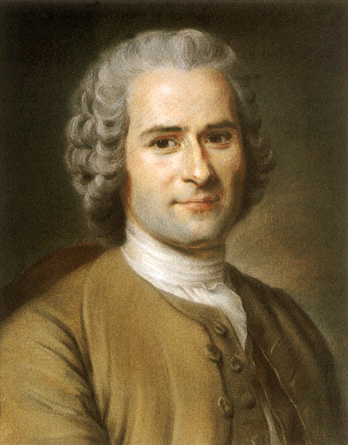
Jean-Jacques Rousseau

The year 1754 is a great date in the literary history of the Suisse Romande, for in that year Rousseau came back for good to Geneva, and Voltaire established himself at Ferney, while in 1753 Gibbon had begun his first residence (which lasted till 1758) in Lausanne. The earlier writers mentioned above had then nearly all disappeared, and a more brilliant set took their place. But Rousseau, though a Genevese, belongs rather to European than to Swiss literature, as do later Jacques Necker and his daughter, Madame de Staël, Benjamin Constant and Sismondi. Madame de Charrière (1740–1805) was Dutch by birth, but married to a native of Neuchâtel. Among her earlier works were two novels, Le mari sentimental (1783), and the Lettres de Mistriss Henley publiées par son ami (1784), both of which had a great vogue in their day and paint, from her own experience, the sad results of an unsuitable marriage. More celebrated by reason of the liveliness and acuteness with which the manners of a little provincial town are described are her Lettres de Lausanne (1871), and her Lettres neuchâteloises (1784), particularly the second part of a story of the former, entitled Caliste, and published in 1788, for, according to Sainte-Beuve, it was a sort of foreshadowing of the more famous Coninne (1807) of Madame de Staël.

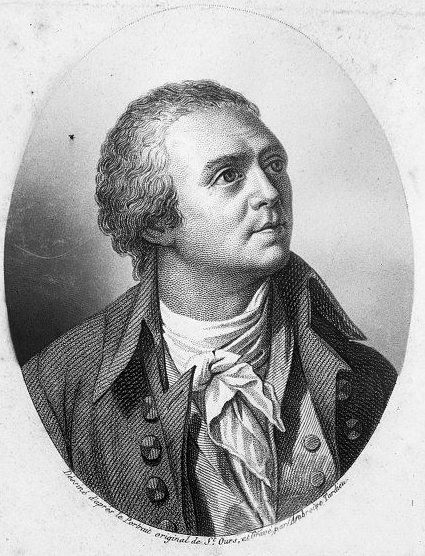
Horace-Bénédict de Saussure

PH Mallet, a Genevese, who held a chair at Copenhagen, devoted himself to making known to the educated world the history and antiquities of Scandinavia. But more characteristic of Geneva were the efforts of a group of men to spread the cause of natural science by personal investigations in the higher Alps, then but little known. Possibly their interest in such matters had been stimulated by the scientific and psychological speculations of Charles Bonnet. The chief of this school was HB de Saussure one of the founders of geology and meteorology, while his Alpine ascents (undertaken in the cause of science) opened a new world even to non-scientific travellers. The brothers De Luc devoted themselves mainly to questions of physics in the Alps, while Sénebier, the biographer of Saussure, was more known as a physiologist than as a physicist, though he wrote on multiple branches of natural science, which in those days was not yet highly specialized. On the other hand, Marc Théodore Bourrit, the contemporary of these three men, was rather a curious and inquisitive traveller than a scientific investigator, and charms us even now by his genial simplicity as contrasted with the austerity and gravity of the three writers we have mentioned. Philippe Cyriaque Bridel (1757–1845), best known as the doyen Bridel, was the earliest of the Vaudois poets by virtue of his Poèsies helvètiennes (1782). But he is better known as the painter of the scenery and people among whom he worked as pastor at Basel, at Château d'Oex, and at Montreux successively. His Course de Bâle à Bienne par les vallées du Jura appeared in 1802, while descriptions of his travels, as well as of the manners of the natives, local history, and in short everything that could stimulate national sentiment, were issued in a series of periodicals from 1783 to 1831 under the successive titles of Etrennes helvétiennes and of Conservateur suisse. His patriotic aim met with great success, while his impressions of his mountain wanderings are fresh and unspoilt by any straining after effect. He was the first writer of the Suisse Romande to undertake such wanderings, so that, with obvious differences, he may be regarded not merely as the forerunner, but as the inspirer and model of later Vaudois travellers and climbers in the Alps, such as Rodolphe Töpffer, of Eugène Rambert, and of the last-named's most brilliant pupil, Émile Javelle (1844–1883), whose articles were collected in 1886 by the pious care of his friends under the title of Souvenirs d'un alpiniste.

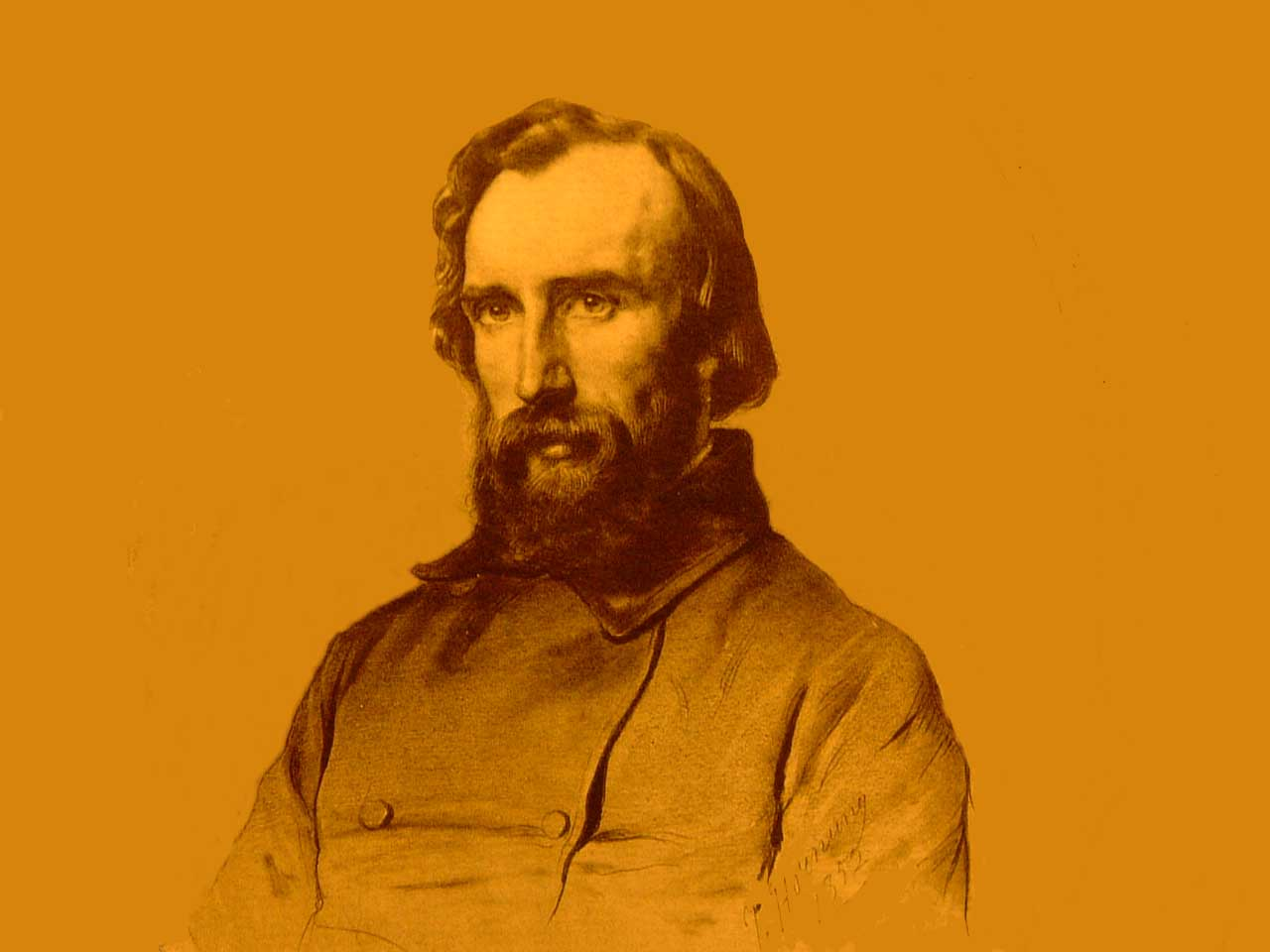
Henri-Frédéric Amiel

As a poet Juste Olivier surpassed Bridel. Nor can we wonder that with the advance of knowledge Bridel's history is found to be more picturesque than scientific. Two Vaudois, Charles Monnard (1790–1865) and Louis Vulliemin (1797–1879) carried out their great scheme of translating (1837–1840) J. von Müller's Swiss history with its continuation by Hottinger, and then completed it (1841–1851) down to 1815. This task did not, however, hinder the two friends from making a number of solid contributions to Swiss historical learning. Later in date were Alexandre Daguet (1816–1894) who wrote an excellent history of Switzerland, while Jean Joseph Hisely (1800–1866), Albert Rilliet (1809–1883), and Pierre Vaucher (1833–1898), all devoted much labour to studying the multiple problems offered by the early authentic history (from 1291 onwards) of the Swiss Confederation. A different type of history is the work of an honest but partisan writer, the Genevese Jules Henri Merle d'Aubign (1794–1872), entitled Histoire de la reformation au temps de Calvin (1835–1878). The Vaudois noble Frédéric Gingins-la-Sarra (1790–1863) represents yet another type of historian, devoting himself mainly to the medieval history of Vaud, but occasionally going beyond the numberless authentic documents brought to light by him, and trying to make them prove more than they can fairly be expected to tell us. Jean Antoine Petit-Senn (1792–1870) was a thorough Genevese and a biting satirist, a pensive poet, the Genevese La Bruyère, as he liked to be called, yet was not fully appreciated until after his death, when his widely scattered writings were brought together. Alexandre Vinet, the theologian, and HF Amiel, the philosopher, in a fashion balance each other, and need only be mentioned here. Jean Jacques Porchat (1800–1864) was one of the most prominent among the minor poets of the region, French owing to his long residence in Paris, and best remembered probably by his fables, first published in 1837 under the title of Glanures d'Esope (reissued in 1854 as Fables et paraboles), though in his day his stories for the young were much appreciated. Urbain Olivier (1810–1888), a younger brother of the poet, wrote multiple tales of rural life in Vaud, while the Genevese novelist Victor Cherbuliez (1829–1899) was perhaps the most brilliant of a brilliant family. Fribourg has produced the local novelist Pierre Sciobret (1833–1876) and the Bohemian poet Etienne Eggis (1830–1867), and Neuchâtel Auguste Bachelin (1830–1890) whose best novel was Jean Louis, a tale of which the scene is laid in the old-fashioned little village of St Blaise. Another Neuchâtel writer, Alice de Chambrier, the poet, died young, as did the Genevese poet Louis Duchosal, both showing in their short lives more promise than performance. Madame de Gasparins (1813–1894) best tale is Horizons prochains (1857), a vivid story of rural life in the Vaudois Jura, remarkable for the virile imagination of its descriptions.

Edouard Rod the novelist, and Marc Monnier, critic, poet, dramatist and novelist, are the most prominent figures in the recent literature of the Suisse Romande. Amongst lesser stars we may mention in the department of belles-lettres (novelists, poets or critics) Charles Du Bois-Melly, T. Combe (the pen name of Mlle Adele Huguenin), Samuel Cornut, Louis Favre, Philippe Godet, Oscar Huguenin, Philippe Monnier, Nolle Roger, Virgile Rossel, Paul Seippel and Gaspard Vallette. The chief literary organ of the Suisse Romande is the Bibliothèque universelle, which in 1816 took that title in lieu of Bibliothèque Britannique (founded in 1796), and in 1861 added that of Revue suisse, which it then absorbed. Amongst historians the first place is due to one of the most learned men whom Switzerland has ever produced, and whose services to the history of the Valais were great, and abbé Jean Gremaud (1823–1897) of Fribourg. The principal contemporary historians are Victor van Berchem, Francis de Crue, Camille Favre, Henri Fazy, B. de Mandrot, Berthold van Muyden and Edouard Rott.

More recent authors include Charles Ferdinand Ramuz (1878–1947), whose novels describe the lives of peasants and mountain dwellers, set in a harsh environment, the poets Blaise Cendrars (born Frédéric Sauser, 1887–1961), Léon Savary (1895–1968), Gustave Roud (1897–1976), Jean-Georges Lossier (1911–2004), Pericle Patocchi (1911–1968), Maurice Chappaz (1916–2009) and Philippe Jaccottet (born 1925), Armel Guerne (1911–1980) and the novelists Catherine Colomb (1892–1965), Monique Saint-Hélier (1895–1955), Alice Rivaz (1901–1998), Prix Renaudot winner Georges Borgeaud (1914–1998), Yvette Z'Graggen (1920–2012) and Prix Goncourt winner Jacques Chessex (1934–2009). Grisélidis Réal (1929–2005) is in a category of her own.

== Swiss-Italian literature ==
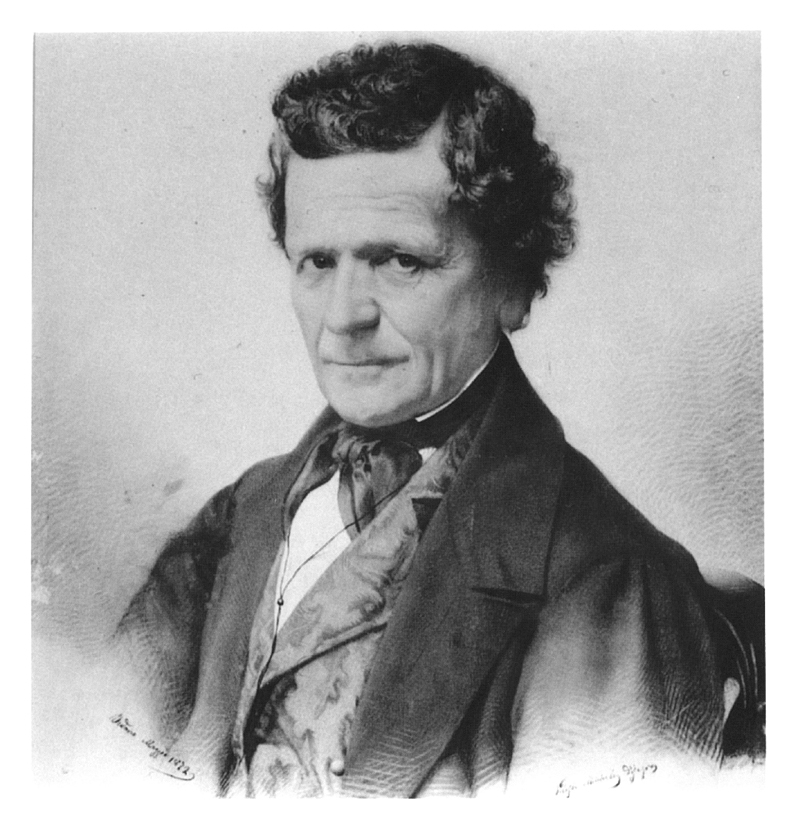
Stefano Franscini

Italian Switzerland is best known by its artists, while its literature is naturally subject to strong Italian influences, and not to any of a strictly Swiss nature. Stefano Franscini (1796–1857) did much for his native land, especially in educational matters, while his chief published work (1835) was one that gave a general account of the canton. But this is not so thorough and good as a later book by Luigi Lavizzari (1814–1875), entitled Escursioni net cantone Ticino (1861), which is complete from all points of view.

Angelo Barotho (died 1893) and Emilio Motta represent the historical sciences, the latter contributing much to the Bollettino della Svizzera Italiana (from 1879 onwards), which, though mainly historical, devotes much space to literary and historical matters relating to the canton. The art of novel writing does not flourish in Ticino. But it has produced a great number of poets such as Pietro Pen (1794–1869), who translated the Swiss national anthem into Italian, JB Buzzi (1825–1898), Giovanni Airoldi (died before 1900) and Carlo Cioccari (1829–1891), the two former were lyric poets, and the third a dramatist. Two "younger" singers are Francesco Chiesa (1871–1973) and M. A. Nessi.

Contemporary poets are Giorgio Orelli (1921–2013) and his cousin Giovanni Orelli (1928–2016), Alberto Nessi (born 1940) and Fabio Pusterla (born 1957).

== Romansh literature ==
Romansh is spoken by some 1% of Switzerland's 7.4 million inhabitants. It is the smallest of Switzerland's national languages in terms of number of speakers, and has not much to show in the way of literary activity. Fears of the language perishing altogether have spurred certain energetic groups to promote and foster a language revival. The five largest languages in the Romansh family are Sursilvan, Sutsilvan, Surmiran, Puter and Vallader. Puter and Vallader are sometimes grouped together as one language: Ladin. Romansh was standardized in 1982. The unified language, called Rumantsch Grischun, is used by the federal government and the canton of Graubünden, where is it an official language, for administrative purposes.

Romansh had a rich oral tradition before the appearance of Romansh writing, but apart from songs such as the Canzun da Sontga Margriata, virtually none of it survives. Prior to the 16th century, Romansh writings are only known from a few fragments.

The oldest known written records identified as Romansh before 1500 are:

- the Würzburg manuscript (10th century) probably written in the Abbey of Saint Gall,

consists of only the sentence: Diderros ne habe diege muscha, considered as an early form of Romansh, two translations proposed are either: "Diderros does not even have ten flies" or "Diderros has ten flies from this", probably meaning that the scribe named Diderros was poorly paid for his work;

- the Einsiedeln Homily dates from the early 12th century, a longer piece of writing discovered in 1907, and consists of a fourteen lines, in an early form of the Romonsch dialect, of incomplete interlinear translation (with the original Latin text) of a sermon attributed to St.Augustine;
- the Müstair linguistic monument dated 1389 and consisting of a fragment of a document about grazing rights on common land in the Val Müstair, it is a court testimony in Romansh attested in an otherwise Latin document:

Introekk in sum la vall de Favergatscha et introekk eintt la vall da Vafergatscha; la e vcinn faitt una puntt chun dis punt alta
e chun dis eintt feder Vinayr

As far up as the Favergatscha valley and into the Vafergatscha valley. There where they are building a bridge which they call punt alta
and what they call eintt feder Vinayr".

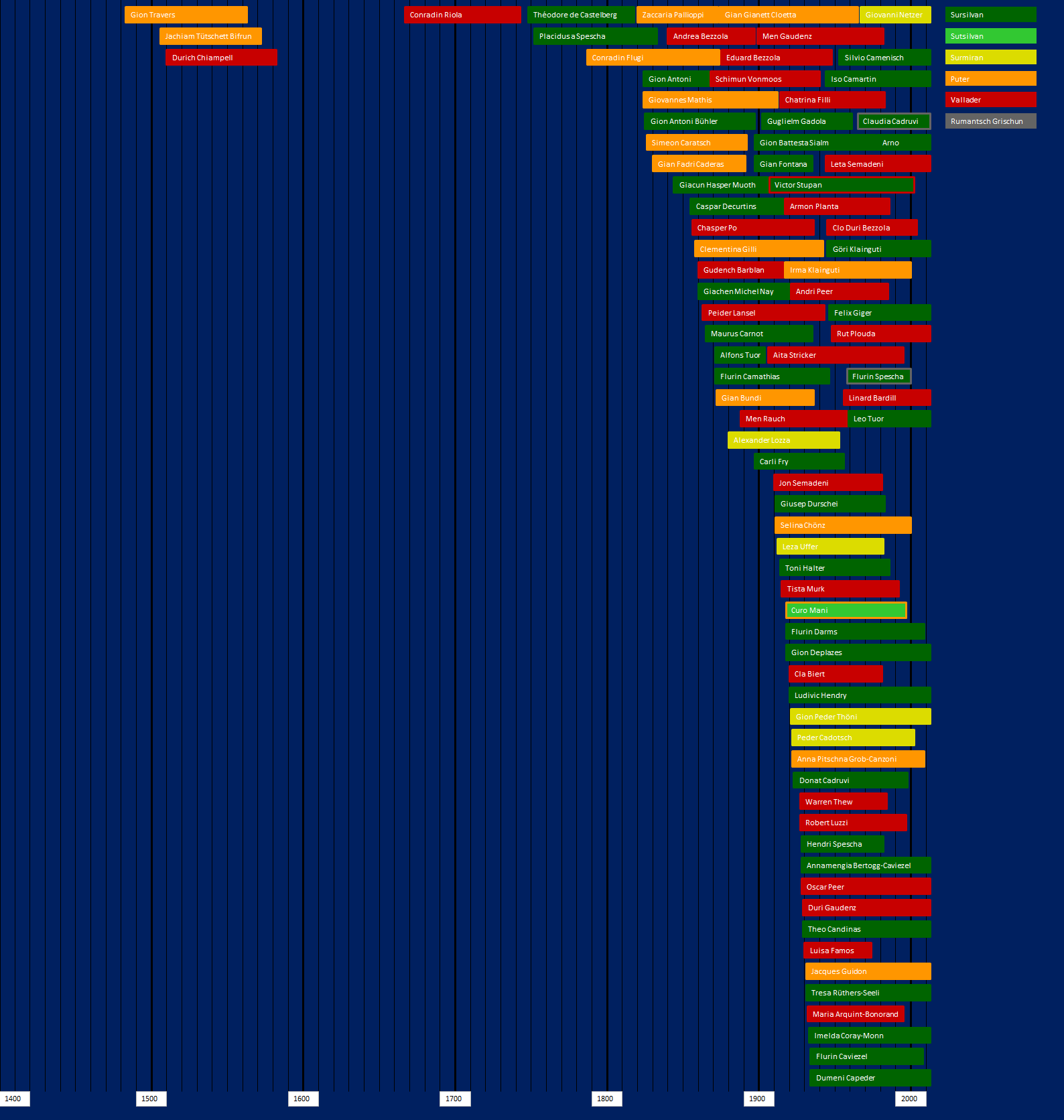
Synopsis on Romansh authors, by birth and idiom (including Rumantsch Grischun)

The emergence of Romansh as a literary language is generally dated to the mid-16th century. The first substantial surviving work in Romansh is a poem in Ladin, the Chianzun dalla guerra dagl Chiaste da Müs written in the Putèr dialect in 1527 by Gian Travers (Johann von Travers, 1483–1563), though it was not published till 1865. It is an epic poem describing the First Musso war which Travers himself had taken part in.

Subsequent works usually have religious themes, including Bible translations, manuals for religious instructions, and biblical plays. The first book printed in it (at Poschiavo in 1552) was the translation of a German catechism, and the next a translation of the New Testament: L'g Nuof Sainc Testamaint da nos Signer Jesu Christ, also at Poschiavo, but in 1560, both works by Jachiam Bifrun/Giachem Bifrun. Most of the works in the Ladin dialects are translations of books of a religious or educational nature. Two years later, in 1562, another writer from the Engadine, Durich Chiampel, published the Cudesch da Psalms, a collection of Romansh church songs in the Vallader dialect.

In the Sursilvan dialect, the first surviving works are also religious works such as catechism by Daniel Bonifaci and in 1611, Ilg Vêr Sulaz da pievel giuvan ("The true joys of young people"), a series of religious instructions for Protestant youths was published by Steffan Gabriel. Four years later in 1615, a catholic catechism Curt Mussament was published in response, written by Gion Antoni Calvenzano. The first translation of the new testament into Sursilvan was published in 1648 by the son of Steffan Gabriel, Luci Gabriel. The first complete translation of the Bible, the Bibla da Cuera was published between 1717 and 1719.

The principal writers in the Romonsch dialects, generally the less literary of the two, in the 19th century are Theodor von Castelberg (1748–1830), a poet and translator of poetry, and P. A. de Latour (about 1811) also a poet, while the best of all poets in this dialect was Anton Huonder, whose lyrics are considered remarkable. Alexander Balletta (1842–1887) wrote prose romances and sketches, while J. C. Muoth (Giacun Hasper Muoth, 1844–1906), himself a most typical and characteristic figure, wrote much in prose and verse as regards his native region.

In Ladin one of the chief figures was the poet Conradin von Flugi (1787–1874), who published volumes of poems in 1845 and 1861, but the poems, novels and translations of Gian Fadri Caderas (1830–1891) are placed above them. Other Ladin poets are Florin Valentin, O. P. Juvalta and S. Caratsch (died 1892), while Peider Lansel (1863–1943) represents a younger generation. Zaccaria Pallioppi (1820–1873) also wrote poems, but the excellent Ladin dictionary that he compiled was not published till 1895 by the care of his son.

Non-religious writings in Romansh began appearing in the second half of the 19th century in substantial numbers. The literary output of this period often deals with the language itself and is seen as part of the Romansh revival known as the "Romansh Renaissance". Most literature of the period consists of poetry and short stories praising the Romansh language and usually dealing with topics related to the rural background of the Romansh valleys. Another common theme is the emigration of the so-called "Randulins", who would spend much of their lives working abroad. In addition, a number of works were translated into Romansh, generally German writers that were popular at the time. Well-known Sursilvan poets of the time include Théodore de Castelberg (1748–1818), Placidus a Spescha (1752–1833) or Gion Antoni Huonder (1824–1867). The best-known Sursilvan poet is Giachen Caspar Muoth (1844–1906) however, who is often considered the most well-versed Romansh poet of all. His poets and ballads often deal with Romansh itself, such as his most famous work Al pievel romontsch ("To the Romansh people"):

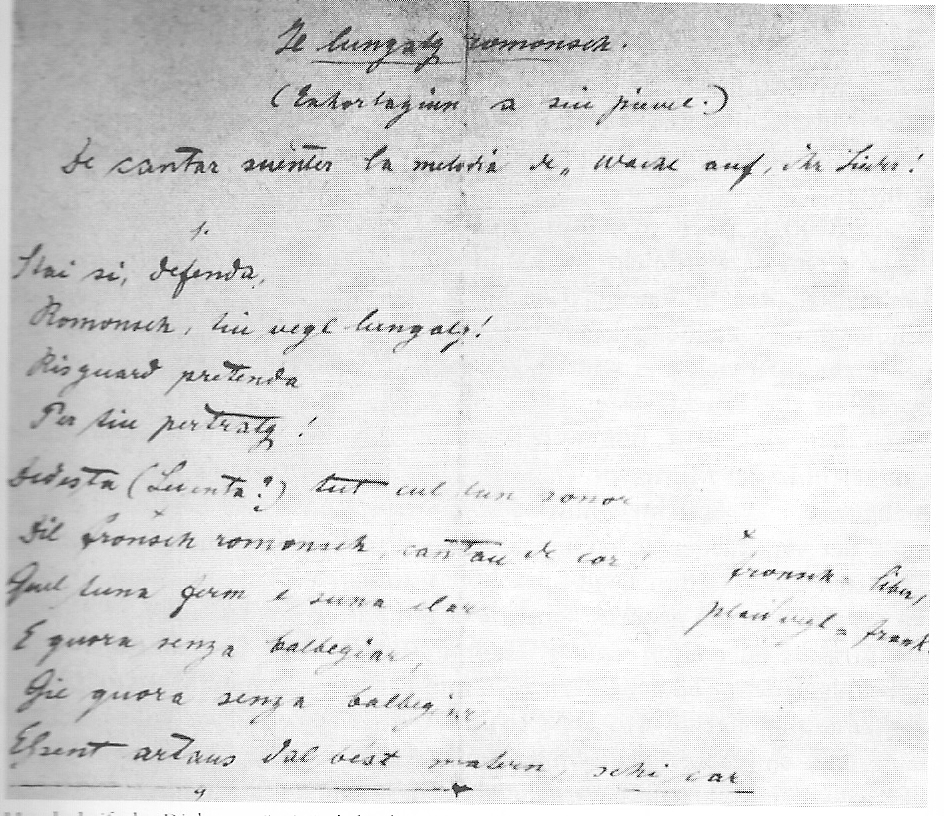
Manuscript of Al pievel romontsch

Stai si, defenda,
Romontsch, tiu vegl lungatg,
Risguard pretenda
Per tiu patratg!

Stand up, defend,
Romansh, your old language,
demand respect
for your thought!

— Giachen Caspar Muoth, Al pievel romontsch

Other Sursilvan writers of the Romansh Renaissance include Caspar Decurtins (1855–1916), who collected among other things popular legends, ballads, and songs, as well as Giachen Michel Nay (1860–1920), who described rural life in several novels, Alfons Tuor (1871–1904), and Gian Fontana (1897–1935), who are also known for their novels. In addition, the priest Maurus Carnot (1865–1935) who had grown up in Samnaun but did not write in the Romansh dialect of his hometown, learned Sursilvan in Disentis, and later used it for plays, lyric, and short stories dealing with rural life. Finally, Flurin Camathias is the author of several Sursilvan plays, poems, and epics, in addition to having translated a number of works into Romansh.

Literary works in Surmiran are comparatively rare, with Alexander Lozza from Murmarera being the most notable one.

In the Engadine, the first modern poets include Gian Battista Tschander and Conradin de Flug (1787–1874). Writers of the Romanticism era include Siméon Caratsch (1826–1891) and Gian Fadri Caderas (1830–1891), who co-authored some works such as the comedy Ils duos poets. Other well-known poets and songwriters of the period include Andrea Bezzola (1840–1897), author of the song Ma bella Val, mi' Engiadina, or Gudench Barblan (1860–1916), author of the song A la lingua materna

Chara lingua da la mamma,
tü sonor rumantsch ladin,
tü favella dutscha, lamma,
oh, co t’am eu sainza fin!
In teis suns, cur eir'in chüna
M'ha la mamma charezzà,
E chanzuns da l'Engiadina
In l'uraglia m'ha chantà.

Dear language of the mother,
you Romansh sound of the Engadine,
you sweet, soft speech,
oh, how I love you endlessly!
In your sounds, when I was in the cradle
did my mother love me,
and songs of the Engadine
sang into the ear.

— Gudench Barblan, A la lingua materna

Another important Engadine figure of the period is Zaccaria Pallioppi (1820–1873). While he also wrote poems of his own, his main work is the first Ladin dictionary, published by his son in 1895. One of the first female writers is Clementina Gilli (1858–1942), who translated several major works of European literature and published a few original works as well, using the pseudonym Clio. Other Engadine writers of the Romansh-Renaissance include Schimun Vonmoos (1868–1940), who wrote poets and short tales in addition to translating, Gian Gianett Cloetta (1874–1965) or Eduard Bezzola (1875–1948), who wrote dramas, comedies, and songs or translated them. The best-known Engadine poet is Peider Lansel (1863–1943) however, who retired at an early age in 1906 and dedicated himself to poetry, becoming one of the first Romansh writers to gain fame outside of his region. His work includes over 200 poems, which were published in several collections in 1907 (Primulas), 1912 (La cullana d'ambras) and 1929 in his principal work Il vegl chalamêr. In addition, his work includes several anthologies of Romansh poets, such as La musa ladina (1910) and La musa rumantscha (posthumous 1950). Shortly before his death, he became the first Romansh writer to receive the Grosser Schillerpreis.

From the 1940s onwards, Romansh writers began to reflect on the widespread economical and social changes of traditional Romansh society and the word of modernity. Andri Peer (1921–1985) from the Lower Engadine is considered one of the first modern Romansh writers, whose works introduced modern literary trends into Romansh. His modern writing style was initially met with opposition, and he was not fully recognized and appreciated until much later. Another Engadine writer of this literary movement is Cla Biert (1920–1981), who became known for his humorous short stories. Notably Sursilvan writers include Flurin Darms (born 1918) for his lyrics, and Gion Battesta Sialm (1897–1977) and Guglielm Gadola (1902–1961) for their short stories. One of the more famous contemporary novelists is Toni Halter (1914–1986), who treated historic or rural themes in his works. Also known for his novels and short stories is the Sursilvan writer Gion Deplazes (born 1918). The Engadine writer Jon Semadeni (1910–1981) is the author of several theater plays and sketches, in addition to writing some prose as well. Also known for their plays are Men Gaudenz and Tista Murk (1915–1992) from the Val Müstair and Carli Fry (1897–1956) from Surselva. More recently, the Sursilvan writer Arno Camenisch (born 1978) gained attention outside the Romansh community for his novels and short stories, including the bilingual Romansh-German book Sez Ner.

Concerning children and young-adult books, some original works have been written in Romansh alongside a large number of translations. The most famous of these are the books of Selina Chönz, whose book Uorsin has become famous well outside of Switzerland in its German version Schellenursli. Other authors include Clo Duri Bezzola (Kindels dal malom), Göri Klainguti (Linard Lum), Linard Bardill (Il guaffen gelg), G. Netzer (Martin steiler, Annina, La princessa loscha), Theo Candinas (La fuigia dil Stoffel) or Claudia Cadruvi (Capuns ed il stgazi dals Franzos').

Drama was represented by biblical plays, most notably the Passiuns sursilvanas (developed in 17th–18th century). From the 18th century, courtroom dramas based on criminal cases were added to the village repertoire. In the early 20th century, a number of villages would stage an annual vernacular comedy. Jon Semadeni established the La Culissa theatrical touring company in 1944. His drama Il pövel cumada, which was first staged in 1946, is considered a landmark in Romansh drama. The company ceased touring in 1977.

From the 1940s onwards, Romansh writers consciously attempted to assimilate influences from international literary movements, as well as reflecting the situation of traditional Romansh culture as a disappearing way of life in a world of modernity and change. In 1946, a Romansh writers’ union was established by Artur Caflisch and Jon Guidon, known since 2004 as ULR (Union for Romansh Literature).

The Romansh writers are organized in the writer's union Uniun per la Litteratura Rumantscha established in 1946, which organizes since 1990 the yearly event Dis da Litteratura an annual Romansh literary festival has been held. Most writers today write in their regional dialect, while the pan-regional variety Rumantsch Grischun is seeing increased use in works done by the Lia Rumantscha such as translations of children's books.

Other writers include: Maurus Carnot (1846–1935), Giachen Michel Hay (1860–1920), Gian Fontana (1897–1935), Leza Uffer (1912–1982), Armon Planta (1917–1986), Gion Luregn Derungs, Gion Deplazes (born 1918), Cla Biert (1920–1981), Andri Peer (1921–1985), Martin Suter, Tim Krohn.

== Statistics ==
In the 2000s, Swiss production of books fluctuated between 10,000 and 12,000 titles per annum.

In 2007, the Swiss National Library recorded a total of 11,410 new titles produced by Swiss publishers. Of those, 6,631 were in German, 2,509 in French, 361 in Italian and 21 in Romansh; the rest being multilingual or in other languages. Taking all the languages combined, 1,983 new titles were in the field of literature proper. Other principal fields were musical publications (1,076 titles), the arts (1'019 titles), law (949 titles), religion (948 titles), languages (467 titles), technology (446 titles), geography (412 titles) and history (409 titles). 410 titles were translated from English, 200 from German and 157 from French. Books originating in 31 languages were translated into one or another of the national languages by Swiss publishers.

== See also ==
- List of Swiss poets
- Swiss Literary Archives
- Alemannic literature
- Helvetism
- Languages of Switzerland

== Bibliography ==
- von Matt, Peter (2012), Das Kalb vor der Gotthardpost. Zur Literatur und Politik in der Schweiz, München: Carl Hanser Verlag, ISBN 978-3-446-23880-0
- Liver, Ricarda (1999), Rätoromanisch – Eine Einführung in das Bündnerromanische (in German), Tübingen: Gunter Narr, ISBN 3-8233-4973-2
