= Caspar Decurtins =

Swiss sociologist and politician (1855–1916)

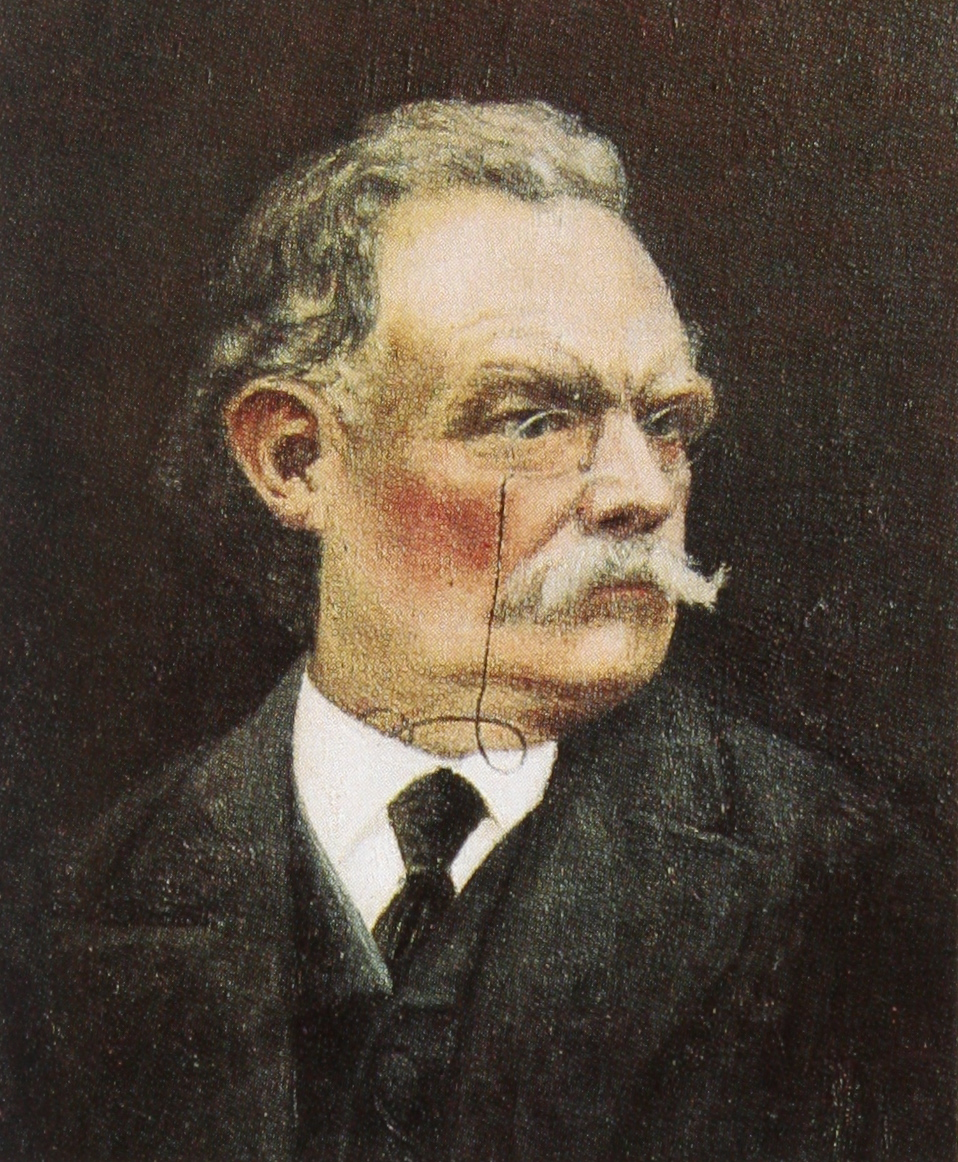
- Born: 23 November 1855; Trun, Grisons, Switzerland
- Died: 30 May 1916 (aged 60); Trun, Grisons, Switzerland
- Occupations: Politician; University professor (Fribourg); Writer; Language activist (Romansh)
- Political party: Catholic-Conservative
- Spouse: Anna Maria Lucia Geronimi
- Parent(s): Laurenz Christian Decurtins; Margaretha Katharina Latour

Caspar Decurtins (23 November 1855 – 30 May 1916) was a politician (Catholic-Conservative) from the Surselva region, up-river to the west of Chur in the Swiss canton of Grisons.

He is regarded as a leading pioneer of the European Social Catholicism movement.

== Life ==
Caspar Decurtins was born in Trun, a small village in the Romansh speaking western part of the canton. His father, Laurenz Christian Decurtins, was a physician and one of the local landowners. His mother, born Margaretha Katharina Latour, also came from a prominent family in the Vorderrhein (literally: "pre-Rhine") valley. The politician Caspar de Latour (1827–1861) was a paternal uncle.

He attended Gymnasium (secondary school) in Disentis and Chur, before moving to Germany in 1875 to conclude his university-level studies. He studied History, Art history and Civil Law at the Ludwig-Maximilians-Universität München and Heidelberg University where after just three (half-year) terms he received his doctorate in 1876. His doctoral work concerned the seventeenth century Grisons Landammann ("chief magistrate") Nikolaus Maissen. He then spent a term at Strasbourg. In political terms, he had grown up in the liberal enlightenment ambience of his mother's family, the Latours. He showed early evidence of his own political commitment in 1874, however, when he was expelled from the Swiss "Zofinger" students' association while still in Chur, after he showed his support for Ultramontanism. In 1875, he joined an alternative student association, the Schweizerischer Studentenverein.

Decurtin returned to Grisons in 1877 and immediately involved himself in politics. On 6 May 1877, despite his youth, he was proposed for election by around 1,300 eligible voters and elected to the Cantonal parliament (" Grosse Rat" / "Grand Conseil"), representing the Cadi electoral district and remaining a member until 1904. In the cantonal assembly he took a leadership role within the Catholic-Conservative faction, today seen as the principal forerunner of the Christian Democratic People's Party. Following the 1881 national election he was elected a member of the lower house of the Swiss Federal (i.e. national) parliament.

A principal focus of his contributions was in the area of social reform. In the national parliament (as in the cantonal one) his was a forceful presence, but he was resolutely non-tribal in his political approach, happy to oppose laissez-faire economic doctrines then in fashion with fellow conservatives, and to work with liberals and socialists in pursuit of social catholic objectives. "Hunger is neither catholic nor protestant", as he pointed out. He joined up with Georges Favon, the radical member from Geneva, to draft and argue for a motion supporting an international law for the protection of workers. His willingness to work with "the left" was believed to be out of keeping with his catholic ultramontane convictions, and attracted lively criticism from within his own party.

There were socially progressive measures that he backed, designed to protect the most socially disadvantaged members of society. He supported half-day working on Saturdays and the establishment of Sunday as a day of rest. On the other hand, he staunchly opposed other "left-wing" goals including railway nationalisation, creation of a Swiss national bank or public subsidy for schools, always fearful of state intervention in school affairs.

Locally, after 1877 he teamed up with Placi Condrau to campaign for the preservation of Disentis Abbey, which had been threatened with closure, as was the fate of many religious houses in Switzerland at this time. A cantonal referendum to preserve the foundation having been won, he then back a campaign to fund and implement its restoration. He was a major force in the so-called black avalanche ("Lavina nera"), which was a political backlash against centralising tendencies within and beyond Grisons.

Decurtins was a leading force in the Romansh revival. He was a co-founder of the "Romania" language association and producer of the "Rätoromanischen Chrestomathie", a 13 volume collection of Romansh literature and folk tales. He was also the driving force in the long running Cantonal Teaching Material Struggle which came to a head in 1900. He had arranged for the young priest, Maurus Carnot, to produce a volume of "Christian soul food" ("christliche Gesinnungsstoff") for the local schools school. It included a German translation of the story of Sigisbert of Disentis, an eighth century hermit credited with having founded what became Disentis Abbey. The book was introduced to the school replacing a German version of "Robinson Crusoe" which Decurtins dismissed as "lightweight" ("zu seicht"). Then, in 1899 a version of the Sigisbert story, "Sigisbert en Rezia", was produced in Romansh. However, Sigisbert came up against the modernising agenda of the education administrators in the cantonal capital, Chur, who had implemented a major school reform in 1890, following the precepts of the influential education reformers Johann Friedrich Herbart and Tuiskon Ziller. It turned out that the prescriptive cantonal reforms included Robinson Crusoe, internationally admired at the time for his civilising credentials. Decurtins led support for the Sigisbert text in a sustained campaign that culminated in a mass meeting in the public assembly place in the main square at Ilanz (in the local language, "plaz cumin"). 2,700 people gathered, including 27 school governors, demanding use of the Sigisbert text and, at the same time, a pay increase for the teachers. The cantonal government backed down. Sigisbert was restored to the curriculum and the teachers received a pay increase.

In 1889 Decurtins worked with his friend Georges Python over the establishment of a University at Fribourg along the Franco-German language frontier to the west of Bern, described by one source as the university's "spiritual father", and according to another, personally interviewing and recruiting a number of the university's first professors. Although he remained a member of the national parliament until 1904, the tide of election results nationally during the 1890s was moving increasingly against his catholic conservative group, and he himself embarked on a parallel career teaching at the university where he was a professor until 1914. As a university professor he taught art history and was noted for his dislike of "modernism".
