= San Peder Castle =

Historical site in Switzerland

- Scuol
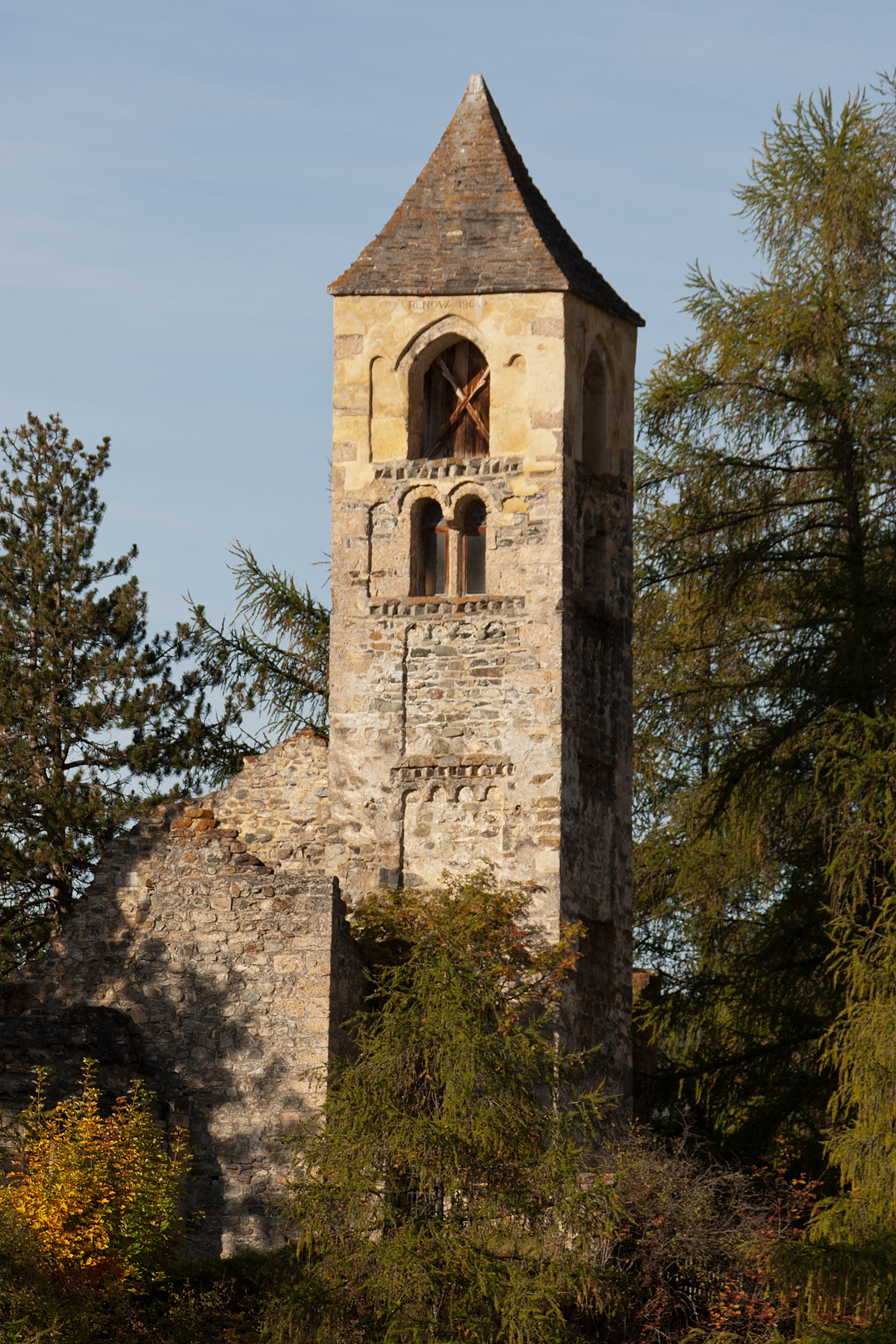
- Tower of San Peder

Site information
- Type: hill castle
- Code: CH-GR
- Condition: Church tower

Location
- Coordinates: 46°48′58.01″N 10°19′58.38″E

Site history
- Built: 12th-13th century

San Peder Castle is a ruined stone tower and a ruined church in the former municipality of Sent (now Scuol) of the Canton of Graubünden in Switzerland.

== History ==
Nothing is known about the castle and church complex from historical records. Chuno and Egino de Sancto Petro are mentioned in 1139 as is Conradus de Sancto Petro in 1274, but the name may not refer to this castle. The Lord of Sent appears as a vassal of the Bishop of Chur around 1160, but is never listed as patron of the church or owner of the castle. Based on the design and construction, the Romanesque church of St. Peter (San Peder) was probably built in the 12th century.

The bell tower of the church looks like a medieval watchtower with the bells added on top. Its construction also indicates that it was probably built as a defensive tower. The walls are 2.2 meters (7.2 ft) thick at the bottom, tapering to 1 m (3.3 ft) at the top and five stories tall. On the north wall at the fifth story there appears to be a bricked over high entrance, which was a common feature of defensive towers. However, there is no sign that the tower was regularly inhabited.

During an excavation in 1937 the larger tower south of the church was discovered. This tower measured 12 by 13 meters (39 ft × 43 ft) and the walls were up to 2.3 m (7.5 ft) thick. This tower was built on the foundation of an earlier building, probably in the 13th century. It was then abandoned about a century later. The large tower, the bell tower and church may have been surrounded by a wall making San Peder a fortified church.

In the 14th century the complex began its slide into obscurity. The Church of St. Peter had become just chapel by 1340. In the 15th century the interior completely renovated and new murals were painted. However, once the Protestant Reformation reached Sent, the church was abandoned. In 1856 the hill was acquired by the Romansh poet Peider Lansel, who repaired and restored the church ruins in 1901. The last repair and reinforcement project was done in 1968/69.

== See also ==
- List of castles in Switzerland
