= Nikolaus Maissen =

Swiss magistrate

Clau Maissen
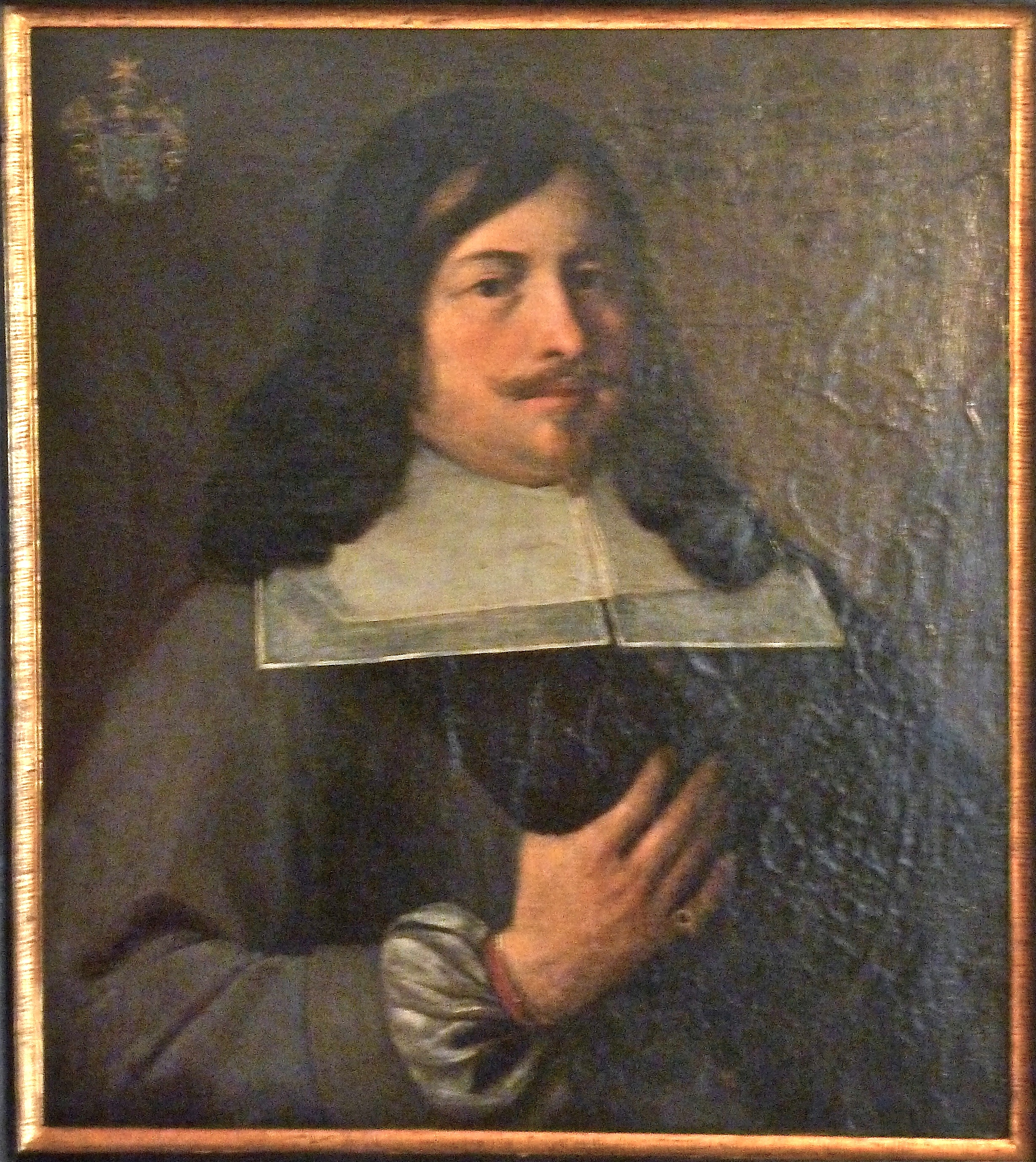
- Born: Nikolaus Maissen; 1621; Sumvitg / Somvix, Cadi (Surselva), "Old" Swiss Confederacy
- Died: 26 May 1678 (aged 56–57); He was killed by two contract killers at Planggis, a hamlet along the road west of Chur
- Occupations: Landammann; Landrichter (regional political leader)
- Spouse: Catrina Waller
- Children: y
- Parents: Padrut Maissen (father); Margreta (mother)

Nikolaus "Clau" Maissen (1621 - 1678) was a "Landammann" and "Landrichter" ("chief magistrate / cantonal chairman" and "top judge") in the eastern part of the Old Swiss Confederacy (approximately the area known more recently as the Canton of Graubünden/Grisons). Living during a century characterised in Europe by recurring outbreaks of plague and frequently violent political confrontations, his own career was marked by conflict. He made enemies of various land owners and rival politicians: he was, in the end, banished and outlawed. He was murdered as he travelled on the main road along the valley from Chur to Ems.

== Life ==
Clau Maissen was born into a leading family of the Cadi (Surselva) region at Sumvitg / Somvix, a small town in the mountains west of Chur, along the route to the Oberalp Pass. Julius Maissen, probably a direct forefather, had been a top local administrator in the mid-sixteenth century: the family and its position were well established, though the twentieth century historiography includes some intense debate over the extent of the family's wealth in the 1620s and 1630s, when Clau Maissen was growing up, and western Europe was embroiled in the hugely destructive Thirty Years' War. Clau's father, Padrut Maissen, was the local "Säckelmeister" (treasurer / taxes administrator). Disentis Abbey, a hugely wealthy foundation thanks partly to it strategic position on the frequently impassable road linking the western and eastern parts of Switzerland, owned most of the cultivable land in the region and also carried significant weight politically. Abbots were engaged in a constant struggle to cement and extend the abbey's (at this time) growing autonomy in its relations with the Bishops of Chur. Surviving sources are silent about where and how Clau Maissen received his education, but it is clear from his later career that he must have received a sound grounding in the various branches of grammar, statecraft and foreign languages.

Maissen was only 23 when he was appointed "Statthalter" (local governor) of Sumvitg / Somvix. Promotion followed. In 1651, 1652. 1653, 1658, 1659, 1670 and 1671 he served as "Landammann" in respect of the entire Cadi district. (Note: Cadi region was the name by which the territories of Disentis Abbey were then known.)

In 1663, for the first time, Maissen was elected "Landrichter" ("chief magistrate / cantonal chairman") of the so-called Obere Bund, the highest political position in the confederation that had been drawn together by the principle landowners involved in order to put an end to generations destructive local warring across what would later become the Canton of Graubünden/Grisons. The term of office for a "Landrichter" lasted one year: Maissen served further terms in 1669 and 1672. Meanwhile, between 1665 and 1667 he served as "Landeshauptmann" (chief administrator) in Veltlin/Valtellina, across the mountains to the south (in a part of the Swiss confederacy subsequently reassigned, in 1797, to what later became part of Italy). Maissen twice served, in addition, as a member of the "Syndikaturkommission", an oversight authority comprising nine men, mandated to provide reports on Veltlin/Valtellina to the Federal Diet/Council of the so-called "Three Leagues" [of the eastern Swiss confederacy] / "Raetia" about Veltlin/Valtellina. The valley, was important to the Swiss, but was also of continuing strategic importance throughout this period as a vital communication route for the "Spanish party", the term frequently used to identify Swiss supporters of the House of Hapsburg, which was keen to retain influence and access in the valley in order to be able to transit from Spain, via the port of Genoa and Hapsburg-controlled Milan, to Hapsburg territories in and beyond Austria. Particular high points in Maissen's political career came in the context of his involvement with the "Raetian Bundestag" (Federal Diet/Council) which convened at Ilanz in 1663, 1669 and 1672. As the local "Landrichter", he hosted the assembly, accepting, in addition, the honour of chairing its deliberations.

Maissen worked closely with his friend and political ally Matthias Schgier, the politically engaged churchman who in 1664 became Dean of Chur. In 1655, very shortly after assuming the papacy, Pope Alexander VII had issued a bull separating Disentis Abbey and 14 surrounding parishes from the control of the diocese, becoming instead a quasi-diocese in its own right, directly answerable to the Holy See. During the ensuing conflict Dean Schgier had persuaded the abbot to surrender the rights thus conferred, but the conflict intensified the intense political polarisation that had outlasted the Thirty Years' War. Both Maissen and Schgier were firmly aligned with the "Spanish" (i.e. pro-Hapsburg) party, and thereby bitterly opposed to the so-called "French" party. As early as 1651 the two men had successfully teamed up to exclude the powerful "francophile" Konradin von Castelberg from his various political offices.

== Nemesis ==
Thanks to the protection both of fellow adherents of the "Spanish" party and of the Bishops of Chur, and especially of the Prince-Bishop Ulrich VI de Mont, Maissen held important political positions in the Cadi/Disentis district, in the so-called "Grey League" (proto-canton) and in its (virtual) free cities, almost without a break between the mid-1640s and the mid-1670s. He had inevitably acquired enemies along the way, both on account of the extent and nature of the power he had exercised and, some suggest, because of the manner in which he had exercised it.

Maissen's opponents in Cadi (Surselva) included local aristocrats and land owners, political rivals and members of the ant-Hapsburg "French" party. These came together to launch a criminal case against him at Disentis. The indictment comprised 44 different counts. Between 1674 and 1676 his enemies came together: by 1676, between them, they controlled the District Court, from which Maissen's potential supporters had been by various means excluded. Sources are not entirely consistent as to the sequence of events in respect of the event surrounding his trial, but there is agreement that Maissen's trial opened during January 1676. That the nature of justice locally had changed had become apparent six months earlier when the court had ordered the burning of 28 witches and had one man hanged. Maissen's request that he should be tried by an impartial court was rejected. The trial was conducted under the leadership of the leading local families who had launched the case against the accused. It was not just the prosecutors who were his political opponents but also the judges. The court delivered its verdict on 9 February 1677: Clau Maissen was pronounced guilty in respect of 44 of the 44 charges that he had faced. His property was confiscated and he was declared an outlaw. According to one report three shots were fired at him as he fled down the valley.

Maissen found refuge in the nearby district of Rhäzüns with his friend Dean Schgier. The Disentis court authorities were hampered in their wishes to find a more permanent solution to their problem with Clau Maissen by the fact that their judicial authority ended at the boundaries of the Disentis district. Any attempt to secure his return to their control would require co-operation from the court authorities of 51 other districts. However, the "Gotteshausbund" (literally "League of God's House") Chur-based confederacy of district authorities and the increasingly closely associated "Zehngerichtebund" (literally "League of the Ten Jurisdictions") both sided openly with Maissen. At the end of August 1677 a neutral "commission of experts" was set up to review the trial. They reached a verdict supportive of Clau Maissen's position during the first part of 1678.

Thus seemingly thwarted, the men who had charged Maissen and secured his conviction now organised two men described in some sources as contract killers to kill him. The murder took place at Planggis, a short distance to the west of Chur, on 26 May 1678. Maissen had been en route to Ems at the time. The killers were a huntsman from Tavetsch called Christian Zein and his partner, Martin Beer. They were both arrested the next day and soon afterwards brought to trial at Rhäzüns Castle. Despite objections received from Austria they were executed by the executioner from Chur in July 1678. Dean Schgier suspected the Abbot of Disentis and his brother of having together commissioned the murder of Maissen, but evidence sufficient to follow up on these suspicions was lacking.
