= Philippe Monnier =

Swiss writer (1864–1911)

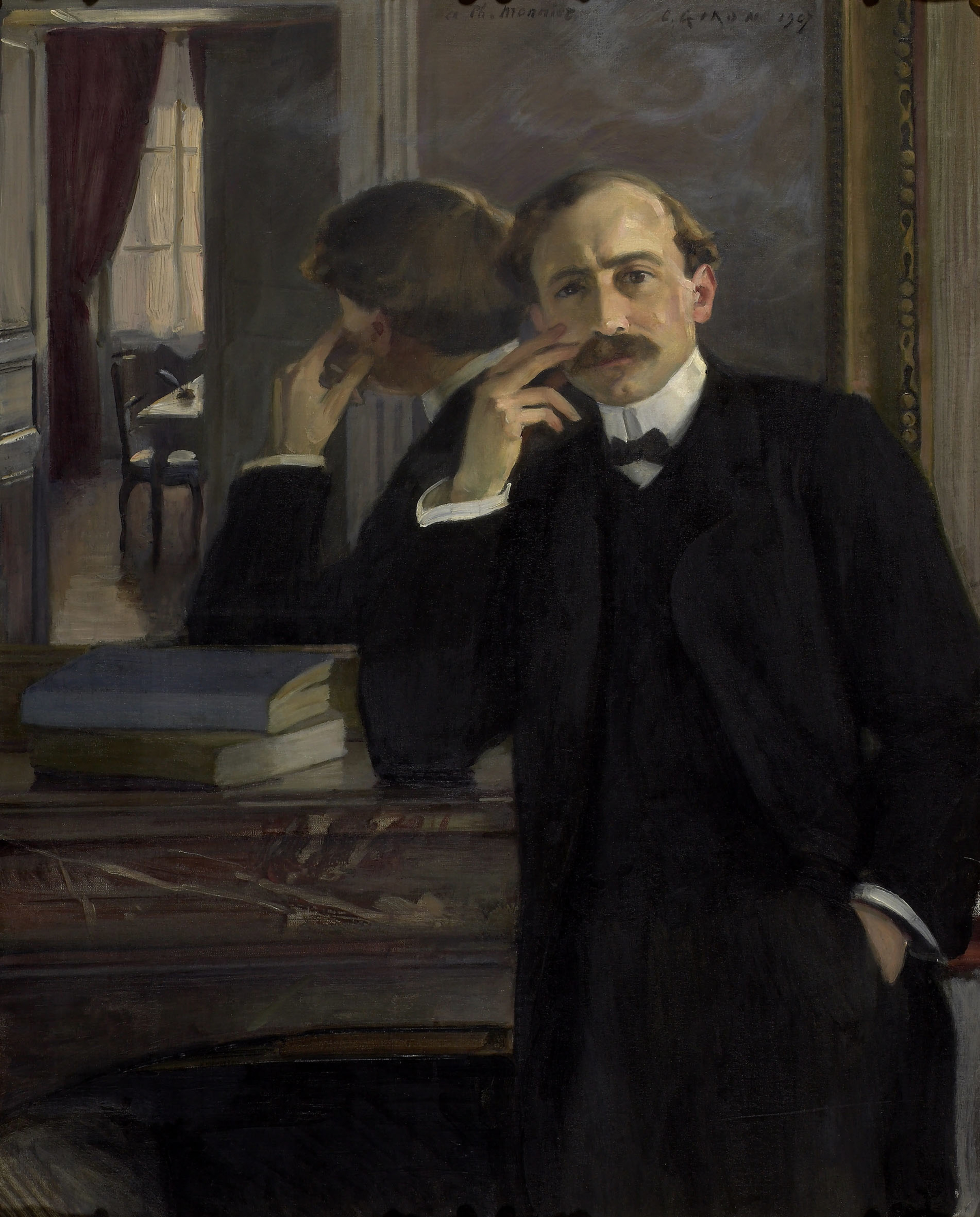

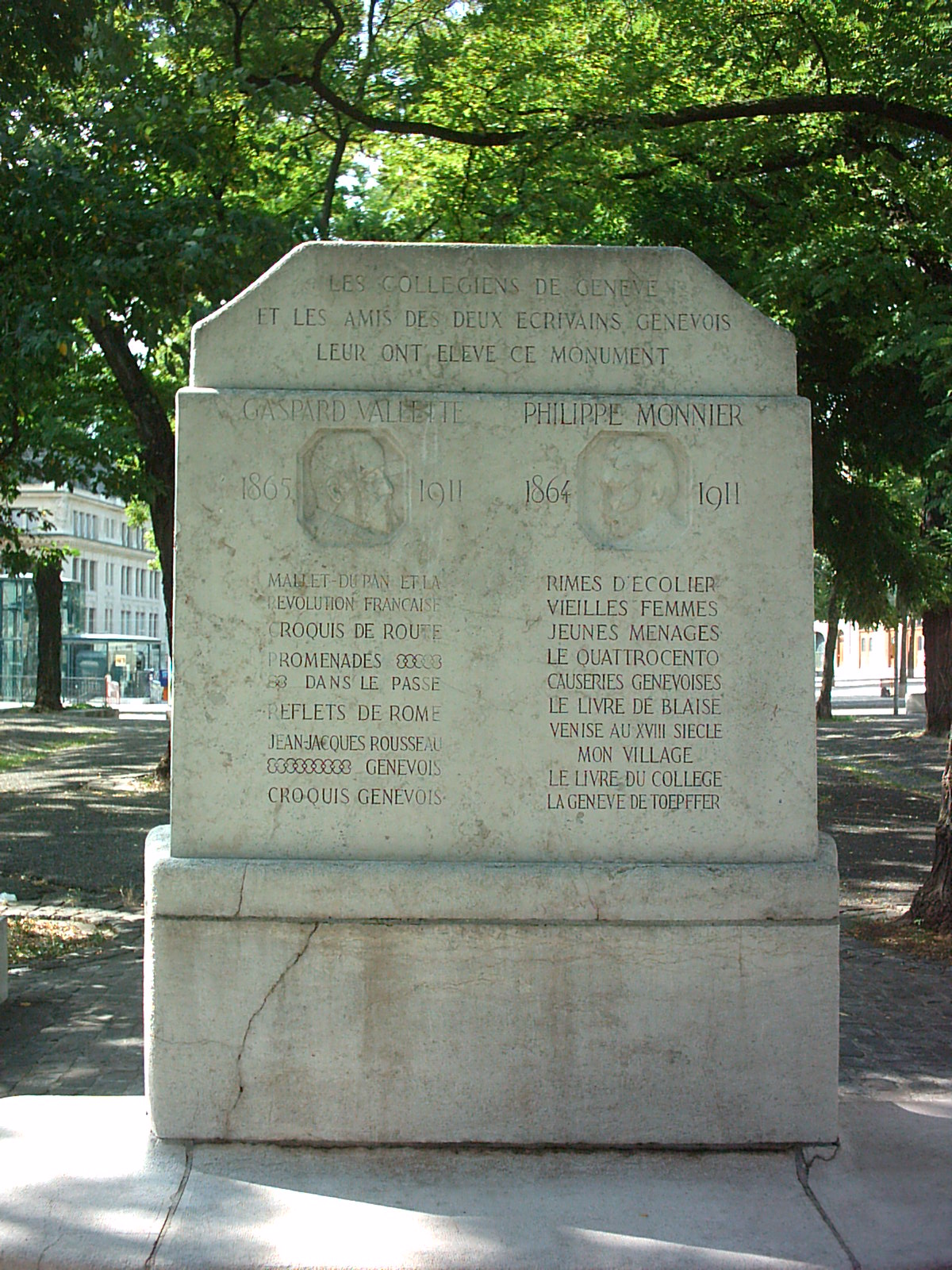
Monument dedicated to Genevan writers Gaspard Vallette and Philippe Monnier (Switzerland)

Philippe Monnier (2 November 1864 – 21 July 1911) was a Swiss writer in the French language.

== Publications ==
Most of his writings dealt with his birthplace of Geneva and its region, from where he originated. He also wrote on the history of Italy and the arts of Italy. He died, aged 46, in Plainpalais.

- Venise au XVIIIe siècle, Tallandier, 2009 ISBN 978-2-84734-591-9
- Venise au XVIIIe siècle, Complexe, 2001 ISBN 2-87027-883-7
- Le livre de Blaise, Lausanne, Éditions Plaisir de Lire, réédité : l'Âge d'Homme, 1998 ISBN 2-8251-1177-5
- Introduction au Quattrocento, Complexe, 1995 ISBN 2-87027-586-2
- Mon village, Genève, J. Jullien, 1927
- Jeunes ménages, Genève, J. Jullien et fils, 1926
- La Genève de Töpffer, Genève, A. Jullien, 1914 (a reference to Rodolphe Töpffer)
- Souvenirs de Kientzheim, Colmar, J.-B. Jung, 1888
- Vers bellettriens, Genève, Jules-Gme Fick, 1888
