= Maurus Carnot =

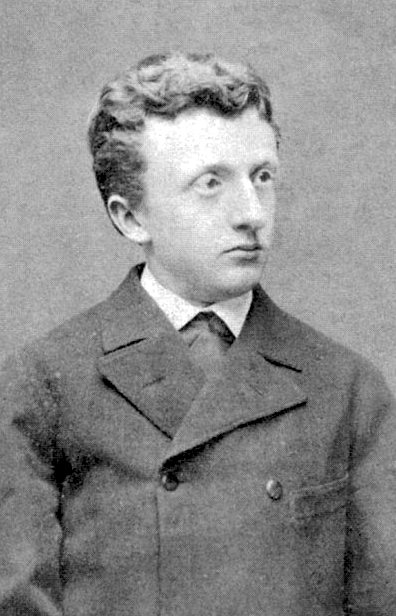
- Maurus Carnot, while still a student
- Born: Johannes Carnot; 26 January 1865; Laret (Samnaun), Ramosch, Graubünden, Switzerland
- Died: 2 January 1935 (aged 69); Ilanz, Surselva Region, Graubünden, Switzerland
- Education: Innsbruck
- Occupations: Monk; Priest & preacher Teacher; Writer of poetry and prose
- Parents: Vincenz Carnot (father); Paulina Jenal (mother)

Father Maurus Carnot (26 January 1865 – 2 January 1935) was a Swiss monk who became revered and loved as a teacher. For almost fifty years he taught at the Disentis monastery school. He also attracted plaudits through his welfare work. During the First World War, both through his weekly local weekly newspaper column and through more direct contacts, he tirelessly begged for and collected money which he then distributed to those in the greatest material need in Switzerland, Austria and Germany. Carnot came to wider prominence as a patriotic writer of poetry, novellas and stage plays, using both German and in a (relatively) mainstream dialect of Romansch.

== Life ==
=== Provenance ===
Maurus Carnot was born at Laret, a mountain village a fifteen-minute walk out of Samnaun. Then as now, the Samnaun valley was a semi-detached part Switzerland in administrative terms. The most reliable road access came, and still comes, not from Switzerland but from Landeck in Austria. One result of the topography was that when Protestantism had conquered most Switzerland more than two centuries earlier, the enclave defined by the Samnaun valley had, like the Austrian crown lands to the north and east and the Italian provinces to the south, remained true to Catholicism. Carnot was the second of his parents' seven children. Vincenz Carnot, his father, was a religious man, committed to the care of his family and the running of the small farm from which the family lived. Having been born on 26 January 1865, he was baptised on 27 January 1865, as "Johannes Carnot". (He acquired the name "Maurus" when he became a trainee priest, 23 years later.)

=== Early years ===
Johannes Carnot was a delicate child, prone to illness. His attendance at the village school was correspondingly infrequent, and much of his early childhood was spent at home with his mother and siblings. After he grew up and left home he would become a regular and "lively" letter writer, and from his correspondence with his parents - especially with his mother, born Paulina Jenal - and siblings, it appears that he was devoted to both his parents. Despite staying at home so much, he suffered no educational deprivation. His uncle Heinrich was a Catholic priest, who was a regular visitor to the family home, took a hand in his education. By the time he was able to move on to secondary school the boy had acquired a solid grounding in, among other subjects, basic Latin. It was on the recommendation of Father Büchel of the nearby parish of Compatsch, who had also been involved in providing the boy's early classical education, that when he was old enough to be enrolled at a secondary school, Johannes Carnot was sent away to study at the Maria Hilf Kollegium (as the Jesuit secondary school was known before 1972) in Schwyz, some 200 km / 125 miles to the west and beyond several substantial mountain ranges. His father accompanied him to Schwyz at the start of his first term. Decades later, as an aging monk, Carnot would write of the acute and sustained homesickness from which he had suffered, and the recollection of which still caused him anguish so many years later. That slowly faded, however, and he remained at the boarding school in Schwyz for five years. He was then able to move on to the University of Innsbruck where he enrolled at the Theology faculty in 1882, and where for the next three years he studied Theology and Philosophy. It was while he was a student at Innsbruck that Carnot began contributing to the "Bündner Monatsblatt: Zeitschrift für Bündner Geschichte, Landeskunde und Baukultur", the monthly popular history magazine produced, at that time twelve times a year, in Chur, for the reading classes in the canton of Graubünden. Some sources describe him as the publication's "Inn valley correspondent".

=== Benedictine ===
Even after he had completed his first degree course, he considered becoming a career journalist. But according to at least one source he already quietly shared his mother's unspoken wish that he should become a priest, and on 4 November 1885 he entered the Benedictine monastery at Disentis and took the Order Name of "Maurus". On 23 June 1888 he made his vows and on 8 July 1888 Maurus Carnot was ordained as a priest by Bishop Rampa of Chur. He subsequently bowed to the wishes of his abbot and, following a lengthy period of resistance, in 1894 accepted the office of dean, which he would retain for 31 years.

As a young monk Maurus made his mark, in the first instance, through his sermons. He had never been to Disentis until his vocation moved him to enter the monastery there in 1885, but very soon after arriving he wrote in a letter that "ten pairs of oxen" would not be enough to remove him from it. He received and where possible accepted frequent invitations for the cities and villages in German-speaking Switzerland to preach to people on feast days. He quickly mastered the local dialect, and would preach in either German or Romansch as appropriate. The city in which he most frequently appeared as a guest preacher over the years was the largest in German-speaking Switzerland: Zürich. An admiring sacerdotal colleague described his preaching as: "simple, heartfelt, kindly and original. Under the waves of his sheer spirituality, listeners absorbed the powerful and frightening truths included. He had the gift of dispensing consolation. His warm understanding and empathy brought gentle sunshine to troubled souls". Nor did he hold back from poetic emotion. But when he was preaching the poet in him never took over from the priest. His explanation, which he liked to share, was simple: "Religion is God's daughter. Poetry is God's granddaughter".

=== Teacher ===
In the Disentis monastery school Father Maurus had the opportunity to teach his favourite subjects: Latin, Greek, German and History. He founded and then led the school's "German student academy" which would produce a number of future parliamentarians, popular orators and preachers. During the 1920s an equivalent "Romansch student academy" came into being, and he eagerly accepted leadership also of this. In the context of the revival of local cultures and languages/dialects that was a feature of the early decades of the twentieth century, Carnot understood, as few others did, how to introduce Romansch literature and history into the school curriculum.

Father Carnot sought to teach through inspiration rather than through compulsion. He had taken delight in freely devoting himself to his studies during his childhood and student years, and he expected the same eagerness to learn from those whom he taught. Through his power to inspire, he was in many cases able to make that expectation self-fulfilling. But there was also a warning that he would deliver: "I am there to lead you to the water: if you do not want to drank, you damage only yourselves" ("Ich bin da, führe euch zur Tränke; wenn ihr nicht trinken wollt, ist es euer Schaden.").

=== Final decade ===
In 1925, aged 60, he resigned the office of dean in order to focus his energies on his writing, the school and his preaching. His health deteriorated and he cut back on his travel, remaining at his desk or in the classrooms at Disentis through the winter months. His preaching remained a key priority, however, and he continued to travel extensively during the summers in order to attend to it. During 1934 the deterioration in his health intensified. On 16 December 1934 he undertook his last expedition from Disentis in order to deliver a sermon. On 27 December 1934 he celebrated Mass for the last time, afterwards acknowledging that doing so had "taken everything out of him".

=== Death ===
By the end of 1934 Appendicitis had been diagnosed. Carnot agreed to leave the monastery in obedience to the doctors' advice, doing so without any expression from complaint, though as he walked down the corridor away from his monastery cell, supported by the abbot and the medical monk, he permitted himself a look back from which observers inferred that he did not expect to return. At the hospital in Ilanz, half an hour down the valley from the monastery, he was operated on by one of his former pupils. It was possible, briefly, to think the operation a success and that he might live on. But on 2 January 1935, slightly more than three weeks short of what would have been his seventieth birthday, Father Maurus Carnot died in the hospital.

== Father Carnot the writer ==
Maurus Carnot wrote stage plays, short stories and poems. His first dramas, "Plazidus", "Armas e Larmas en la Cadi" (based on the aftermath of the invasion of the region by French troops in 1798/99) and "Friedensengel" ("Angel of Peace") all appeared before 1900. These were followed in 1902 by "Feurige Kohlen" ("Burning coals") which became Carnot's best known work among contemporaries. Despite the inherently regional nature of his writing, it was translated into English and Polish. The English version was staged to great acclaim in America, while the German version was even staged at the Hofburg Theatre in Vienna.

In his final stage work, "Die Passion", Father Carnot set aside all secular legends and adhered strictly to the corresponding Gospel narrative. The premier performance was presented on 5 March 1933 and lasted about four hours. Subsequent performances have been significantly cut back. A shortened open air performance, the text adapted for a new generation, took place at Domat/Ems in 1979. Further performances occurred, again at Domat/Ems, in 1989 and in 2013. With the exception of "Die Passion", however, Carnot's stage plays have been very largely forgotten.

Carnot's numerous historical short stories and novellas were all set in Graubünden. Early ones were "Bündnerblut" and "Steinbock und Adler". Later came "Graben und Gruben" and the Romansh language work "Monas e Minas". The best known of them, appearing in 1919 and subsequently reissued at least twice, was the 250 page novella-trilogy "Wo die Bündnertannen rauschen". He then accepted a commission from the Catholic-Conservative politician Caspar Decurtins to write the short story "Sigisbert im rätischen Tale" which told the story of the (probable) founder of the Disentis Monastery. It was used to replace a German translation of "Robinson Crusoe" (which Decurtins thought "too lightweight") as a compulsory text for school curricula in Graubünden. The substitution triggered significant political strife in the canton. The tale was initially published in German, but a Romansch language version, "Sigisbert en Rezia", followed in 1899. It was most recently republished, in a "multilanguage" edition, in 2014. Father Maurus also gave much joy and entertainment to many with his so-called "Calendar tales", short stories published (almost) annually during his later decades. These were also important in bringing him many new readers and admirers. His final published prose work, the relatively substantial novella "Die Geschichte des Jörg Jenatsch", appeared in 1930.

Father Carnot's poetry reflects his powerful preoccupation with his homeland, with recurring themes such as the parental home in which he grew up, the monastery which was his home for most of his life, the natural landscape, the animals and plants, along with the region's historical figures. Some of his poems appeared in newspapers and magazines. In 1914, "at the insistence of his friends", a collection of his lyric poems appeared in a single volume which at the time was considered by some to be the most significant book published that year in Switzerland. A significantly reworked second version followed in 1920 and was re-issued again, in 1934, shortly before the poet's death.

== Habsburg connections ==
The exceptional depth of Father Carnot's love for his homeland is apparent from his written work and from the choices he made during his life, but in Switzerland political centralisation had, for centuries, been an anathema: Carnot's patriotism was focused in the first instance on the canton of Graubünden rather than on the Old Swiss Confederacy or its Napoleonic successor, the Swiss Confederation. Even within Graubünden, the Samnaun valley in which he was born enjoyed and enjoys a semi-detached status. In 1892, recognising that the then impenetrable mountains which separated the valley from the rest of Switzerland meant that virtually all Samnaun's trade left the valley by a single road that runs directly into the princely County of Tyrol (a Cisleithanian Crown land of the Austrian emperor), the Federal Council (Swiss national parliament) in Bern stipulated that the Samnaun valley should be designated as a duty-free zone. It is considered in no way worthy of comment by commentators from the region that when, exceptionally, a gifted boy with priestly potential from the Samnaun valley was able to attend a university, he should - as Johannes Carnot did - become a student at the University of Innsbruck in the (reassuringly Catholic) Austrian Tyrol, rather than an equivalent Swiss institution. That is the context in which the adult poet, Maurus Carnot, evinced an affectionate attachment to the Habsburg monarchy. When Crown-Prince Otto von Habsburg celebrated his First Communion during 1918, Father Carnot was moved to write a short poem celebrating the event and send a copy to the Imperial Family in Vienna. He received a simple handwritten letter of thanks from the young empress which marked the beginning of an association with the imperial family that would endure for the rest of Father Carnot's life.

Months later the European war ended, with Austria in the losing side. The Republic of German-Austria was proclaimed on 12 November 1918, the emperor by this point having released his state officials from their oaths of loyalty. On 3 April 1919 the emperor was formally dethroned by Austria's Constituent National Assembly (preliminary parliament) and exiled. Emperor Karl had already relocated to Wartegg Castle (St. Gallen) in Switzerland a couple of weeks earlier. In May 1919 the deposed imperial family found another temporary home at the Château de Prangins in francophone western Switzerland. Very soon after the former emperor's arrival in Switzerland, while still installed at Wartegg Castle in the east of the country, he received what seems to have amounted to a quiet pastoral visit from Father Carnot, keen to see for himself "whether those who had been cast out might not be in need of consolation, a small ray of joy". At least one source describes the "Disentis Benedictine Father Maurus Carnot" as a friend of the [imperial] family in 1919. That judgement may still have been a little out of time, but over the next decade and a half it became a simple reality.

Nor was the implausible friendship between Father Maurus and the Habsburgs an exclusively private matter. He produced a little book entitled "Grün im Tirol" of which little is known, except that it seems to have included or amounted to some sort of defence of the deposed emperor. Carnot explained his position in a characteristically forthright letter addressed to a fellow churchman, Canon Vinzenz Kreyenbühl in or shortly before 1922: "As a non-Austrian I found I was the only one who could, through as long and sad period, use my pen as a sword with which the defend the emperor, in my little book "Grün im Tirol", against the foul-spirited slander and persecution to which he was being subjected". (Note: "Als Nicht-Österreicher war ich eine lange und traurige Zeit hindurch der Einzige, der den von allen bösen Geistern verfolgten und verleumdeten Kaiser mit dem Schwert der Feder in meinem Büchlein Grün im Tirol verteidigen konnte.")

== Foundation ==
The "Father Maurus Carnot Foundation" was inaugurated at Chur on 8 October 1986. The launch came in the aftermath of celebrations the previous year marking the fiftieth anniversary of Father Carnot's death. In January 1985 an "impressive celebration" took place at Disentis monastery, which featured an exhibition, designed and managed by the monastery historian, Father Urban Affentranger, presenting the life and works of Father Carnot. The founding of the foundation was preceded, in addition, by a major fund raising operation. The original board of trustees included Father Paul Carnot, Father Carnot's nephew and a member of the pastoral team at the cathedral, along with Disentis Monastery historian, Father Urban Affentranger. Several members of Maurus Carnot's family from Samnaun were also included.

The foundation's objective is to collect all books, manuscripts and documents by and about Father Maurus Carnot. Another key objective is to promote cultural and research activity concerning Samnaun. The launch objective was accelerated both by the work already undertaken by Father Urban Affentranger in connection with the 1985 Maurus Carnot exhibition and by Carnot's kinsman Josef Jenal, who had been building a collection of appropriate books, documents and other Carnot memorabilia from second hand bookshops for some time. Jenal transferred his entire Carnot collection to the new foundation at cost price. Very shortly after its launch the "Father Maurus Carnot Foundation" therefore found itself with enough material to set up a permanent exhibition in a room at the little "Chasa Retica Museum" (loosely, "Samnaun Valley Museum") along the main road east out of Samnaun towards Pfunds and Landeck.
