= Elogius Kiburger =

Elogius Kiburger (died 18 July 1506) was 15th-century Swiss priest and chronicler.

He is first mentioned in 1439, then in the service of the Bubenberg family. From 1446, he was pastor at Einigen and from 1456 to 1503 at Worb, from 1478 also chaplain and chamberlain at Münsingen, and from 1488 until his death Canons Regular at the St. Vinzenz collegiate church in Bern.

Kiburger wrote the Strättliger chronicle at some point after 1464, dedicated to the lords of Bubenberg. In the 1480s, he also wrote a Regimen pestilentiale, discussing an outbreak of the plague in Bern in 1439.
