= Peider Lansel =

Peider Lansel (August 15, 1863 – December 8, 1943) was a Swiss Romansh lyric poet. He is most known for having revived Rhaeto-Romansh as a literary language. His family was from Sent, Switzerland, (although he was born in Pisa) and worked as a merchant, as well as being a poet.
