= Disentis Abbey =

Benedictine monastery in Graubünden, Switzerland

Coordinates: 46°42′25″N 8°51′23″E

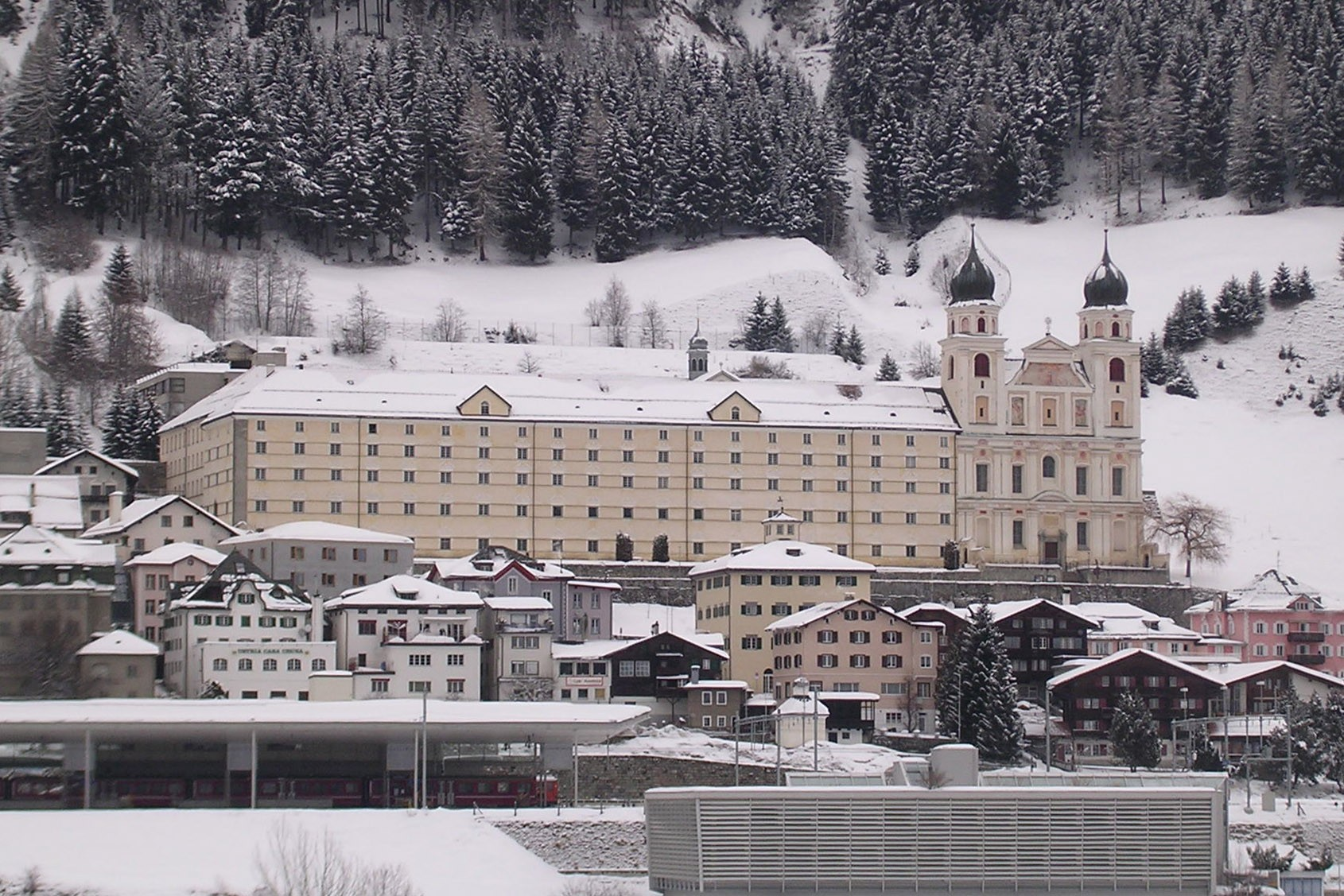
- Interactive map of Disentis Abbey

Monastery information
- Order: Benedictine
- Established: 614 (traditional)

Architecture
- Country: Switzerland

Disentis Abbey (German: Reichskloster Disentis) is a Benedictine monastery in the Canton of Grisons in eastern Switzerland, around which the present town of Disentis (Romansh: Mustér) grew up.

== Early history ==
Formerly the date of the foundation of this abbey, attributed to the local saints Placidus and Sigisbert, was held to be 614. The tradition further states that this monastery was destroyed by the Avars in 670, when the abbot and thirty monks were martyred. The abbey, dedicated to Saint Martin of Tours, was then supposedly rebuilt by Charles Martel and Saint Pirmin about 711.

The second and current view, based on more substantial research, is however that the foundation did not take place until the early 8th century. This is corroborated by archaeological investigation showing that the first traceable structure on the site was built in or about 700 and was destroyed in about 940, which is attributed to raiding Saracens.

The account of Sigisbert, as dramatised in the 12th century work, the "Passio Placidi", is that he was a wandering Frankish monk, inspired by the ideals of Columbanus and Luxeuil, who set up a cell here, under the protection of Saint Martin. Placidus was a local magnate and landowner, who supported Sigisbert, and who was murdered by Victor, the praeses ("president") of Chur, in an attempt to prevent the loss of independence involved in the transfer of a large amount of land to the church.

One of the earliest surviving documents relating to Disentis is the so-called "Testament of Tello", Bishop of Chur, which is dated 765 and records the already very extensive properties owned by the monastery. The story of the "Passio Placidi" makes Tello the son of Viktor, and the properties a guilt offering for the murder of Placidus. Whether or not this is so, the abbey had certainly acquired a very large estate by this date. Tello bequeathed his extensive landed and movable wealth, which was concentrated in the lower Surselva between Flims and Trun, to the Abbey. Cadi, the Sursilvan for "House of God" (Casa Dei), is the historical name of Disentis Abbey and its feudal territories.

Charlemagne visited the re-built abbey on his return journey from Rome in 800 and made many benefactions to it. It was a "Reichskloster" (directly answerable to the Emperor and thus free from the claims of other territorial lords) from very early in its existence. Disentis' claim to imperial interest was its strategic position on the Lukmanier Pass, which the Emperors Otto I and Frederick Barbarossa crossed during their journeys south. Successive abbots were able to capitalise on this to the advantage of the abbey, which received landholdings that extended as far as Lombardy, and which resulted in the establishment of a monastic state of considerable size.

Udalric I (1031–55) was the first abbot to be made a prince of the empire, as were several others later; many of them also became bishops of the neighbouring sees.

The subjects of Disentis Abbey first used their own seal in 1285. They had their own Landammann (mistral) from 1371. Cadi became an autonomous commune (cumin grond) of the Grey League in 1401. From 1472, the mistral was elected from a ticket of three candidates submitted by the abbot, from the 17th century in free elections. Until 1851, Cadi was divided into four jurisdictions (courts): Disentis, Tujetsch, Brigels with Medel, and Trun with Sumvitg.

In 1617 the abbey became a member of the recently formed Swiss Congregation (now part of the Benedictine Confederation). The buildings were refurbished in the Baroque style between 1683 and 1704. The monastery church of St. Martin was built in 1712 and underwent restoration in 2016.

== Modern history ==
In 1799 the abbey was burned and plundered by the soldiers of Napoleon's army, and many valuable items, books and archives were destroyed, including a 7th-century manuscript chronicle. The printing press that had been set up in 1729 was also destroyed at the same time, but much of the melted type and other metal was saved and from it were made the pipes of the organ of the church of St. Martin's in Disentis. Most of what was not destroyed was confiscated to fund the war effort. The abbey also lost half of its estates. It was nevertheless rebuilt by Abbot Anselm Huonder, the last of the abbots to enjoy the rank and title of Prince of the Empire.

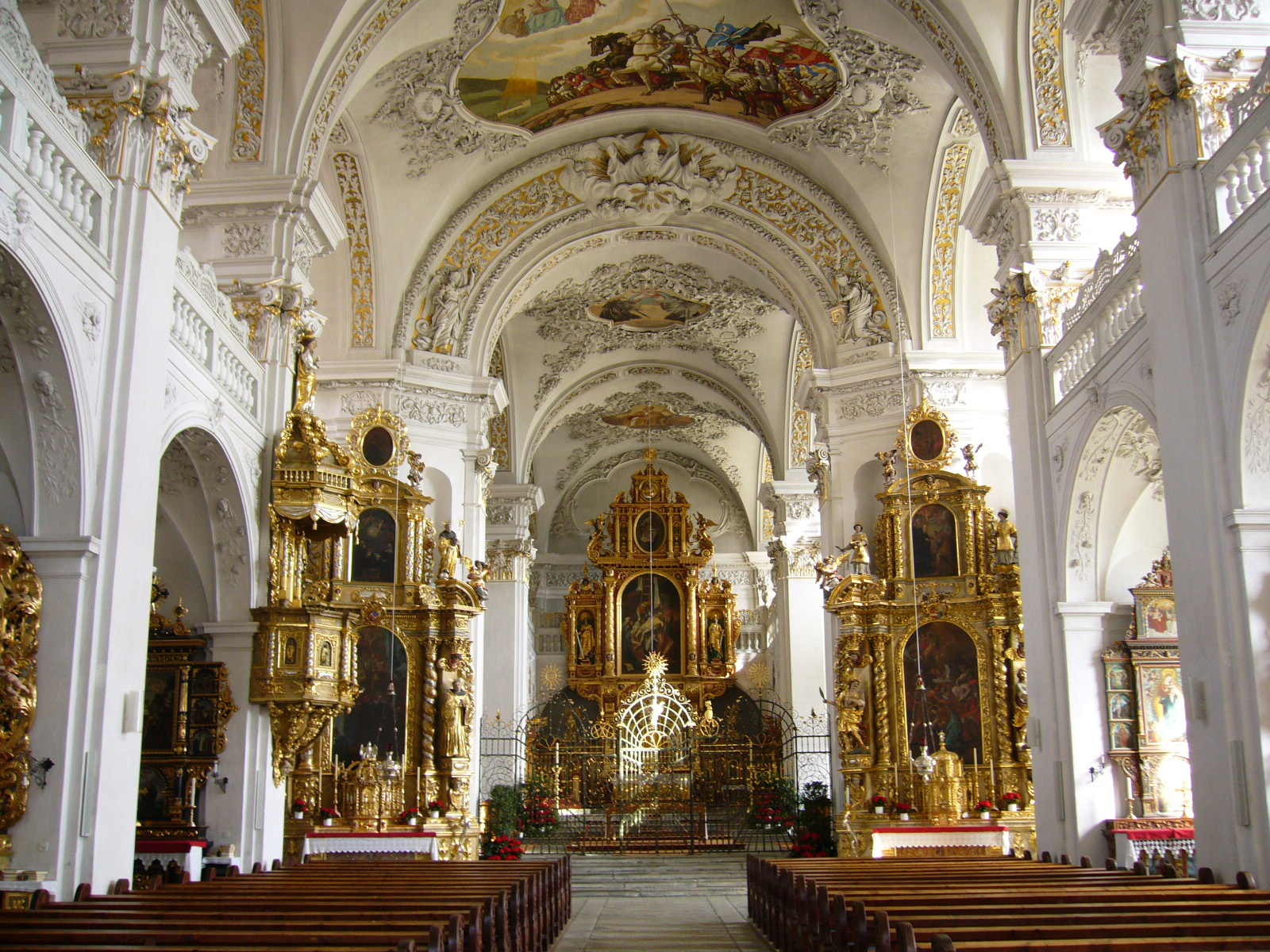
The abbey church

The feudal territory of the Abbey, which had held wide-ranging autonomy since the 15th century and which had purchased their freedom from abbey tithes in the 18th century, was formally abolished under the Helvetic Republic, in 1799, although the traditional system of governance was retained until the new cantonal constitution of 1851.

Although Disentis managed to escape the dissolution which was the fate of most religious houses at that time, the 19th century was nevertheless a difficult and precarious period. In 1880, with the restoration of religious houses in Switzerland, Disentis opened a secondary school, which continues to this day.

== Present day ==
The abbey continues as a religious community following the Rule of St. Benedict. It has both a grammar school and a highly regarded gymnasium (secondary school). Around a third of the students are boarders. In 2004, the girl´s boarding school, which accepts girls from low income families, received a grant from the Stavros Niarchos Foundation. The monastery has a comprehensive Romansh library.

== Images ==
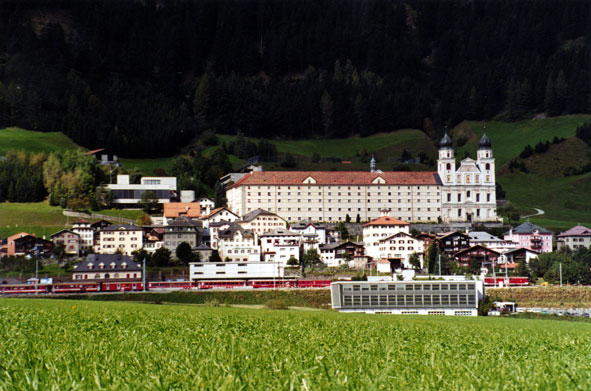
Disentis Abbey

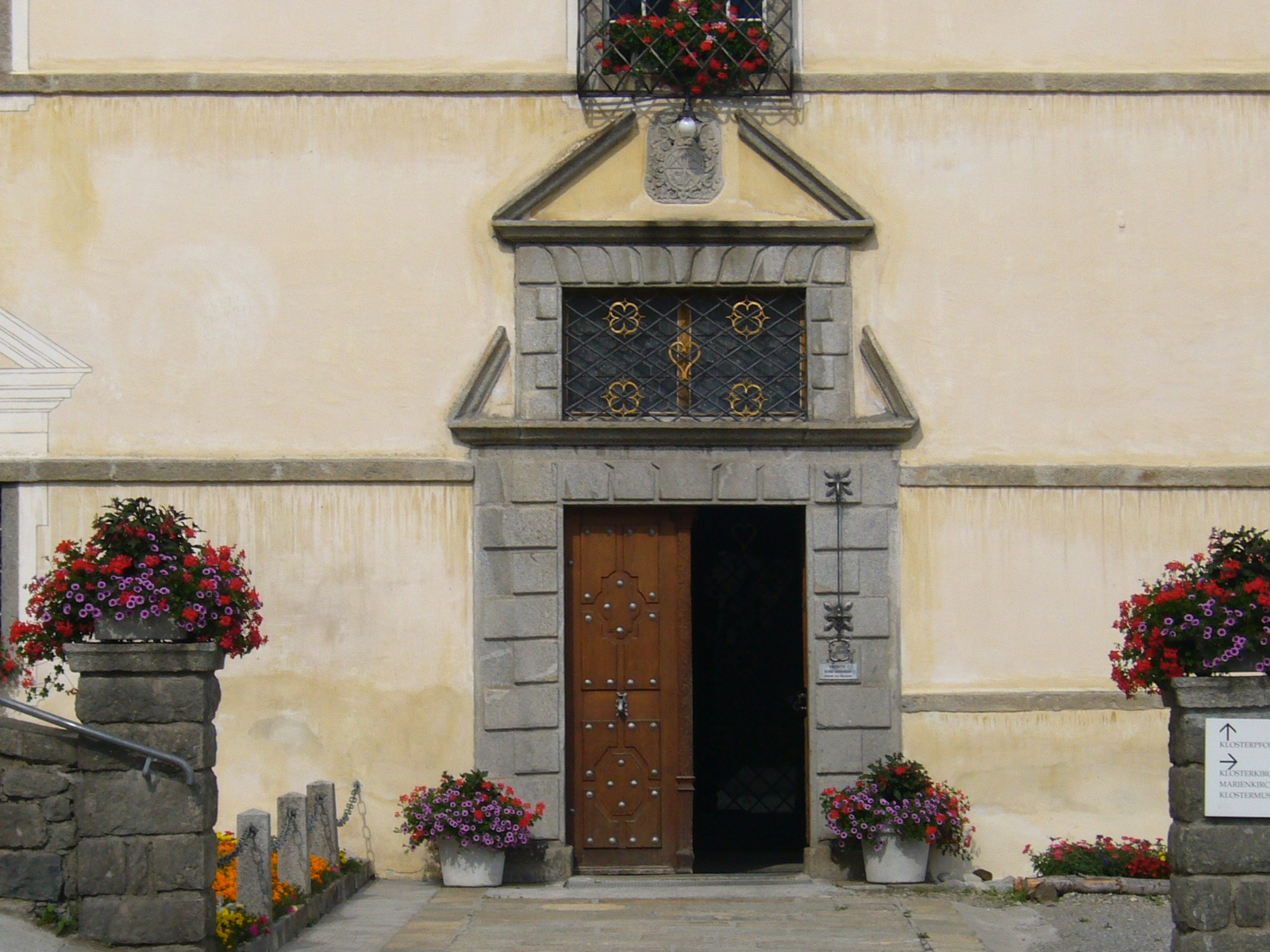
Monastery entrance

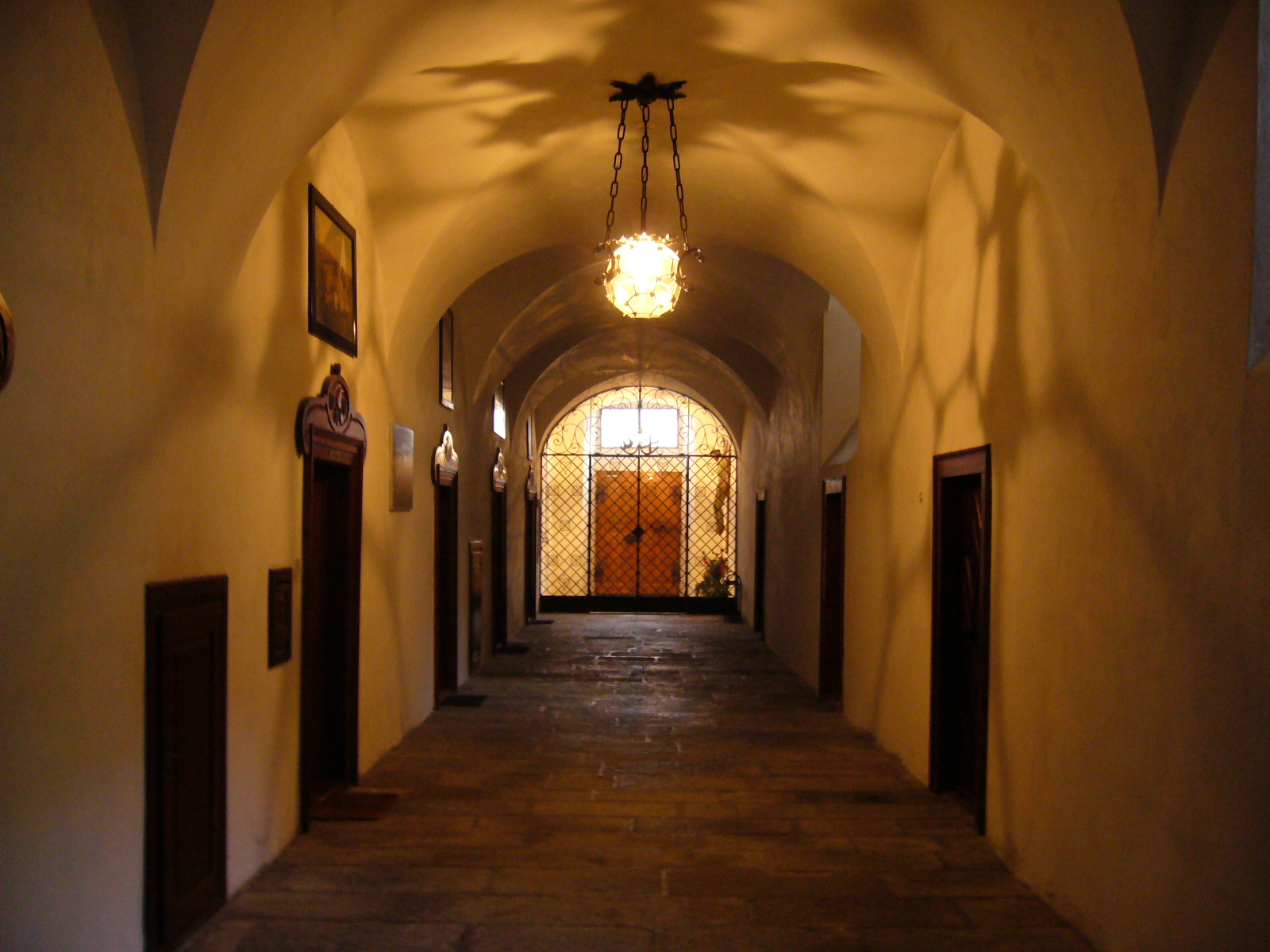
Inside the monastery entrance

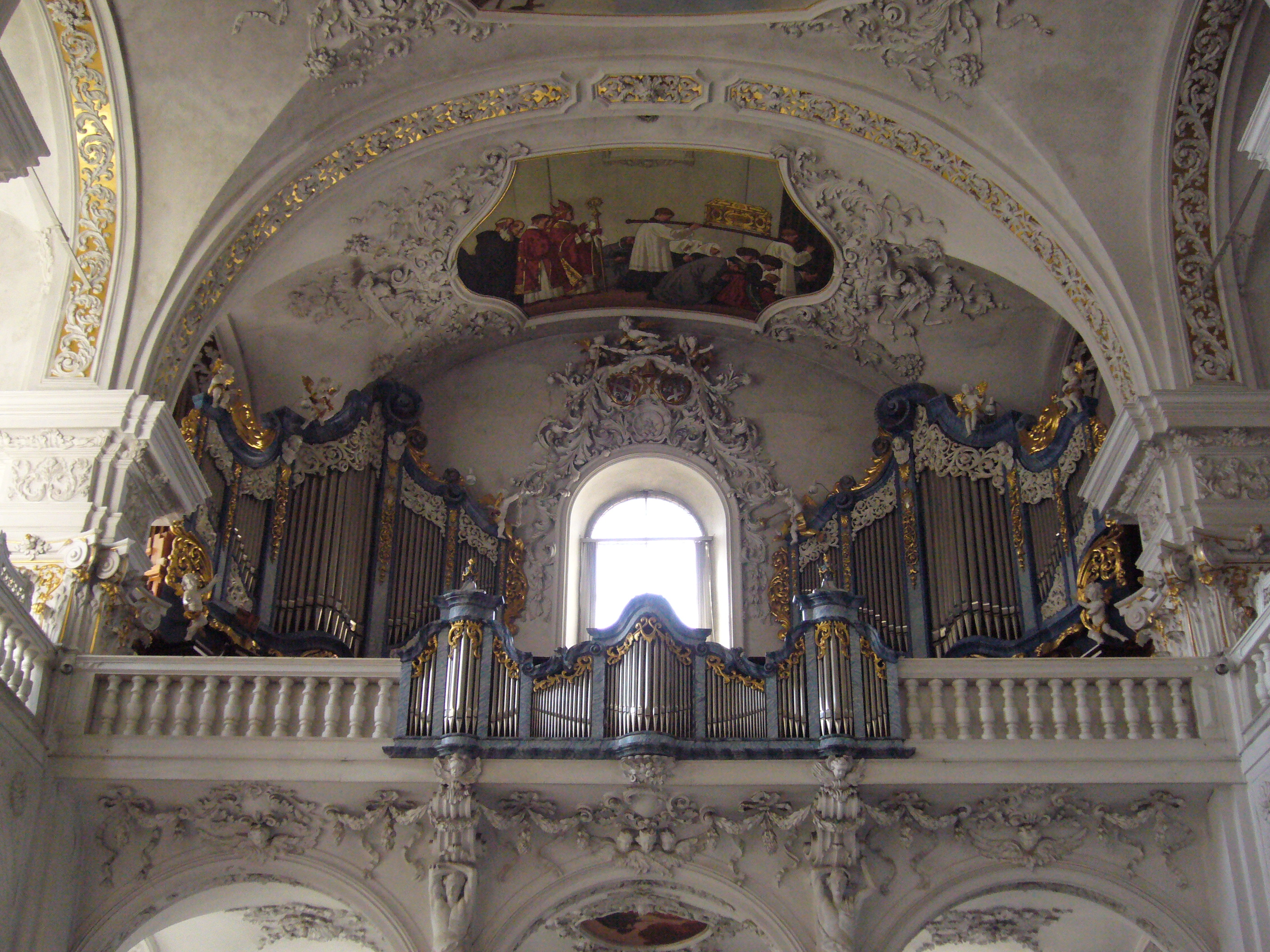
Gallery of the church

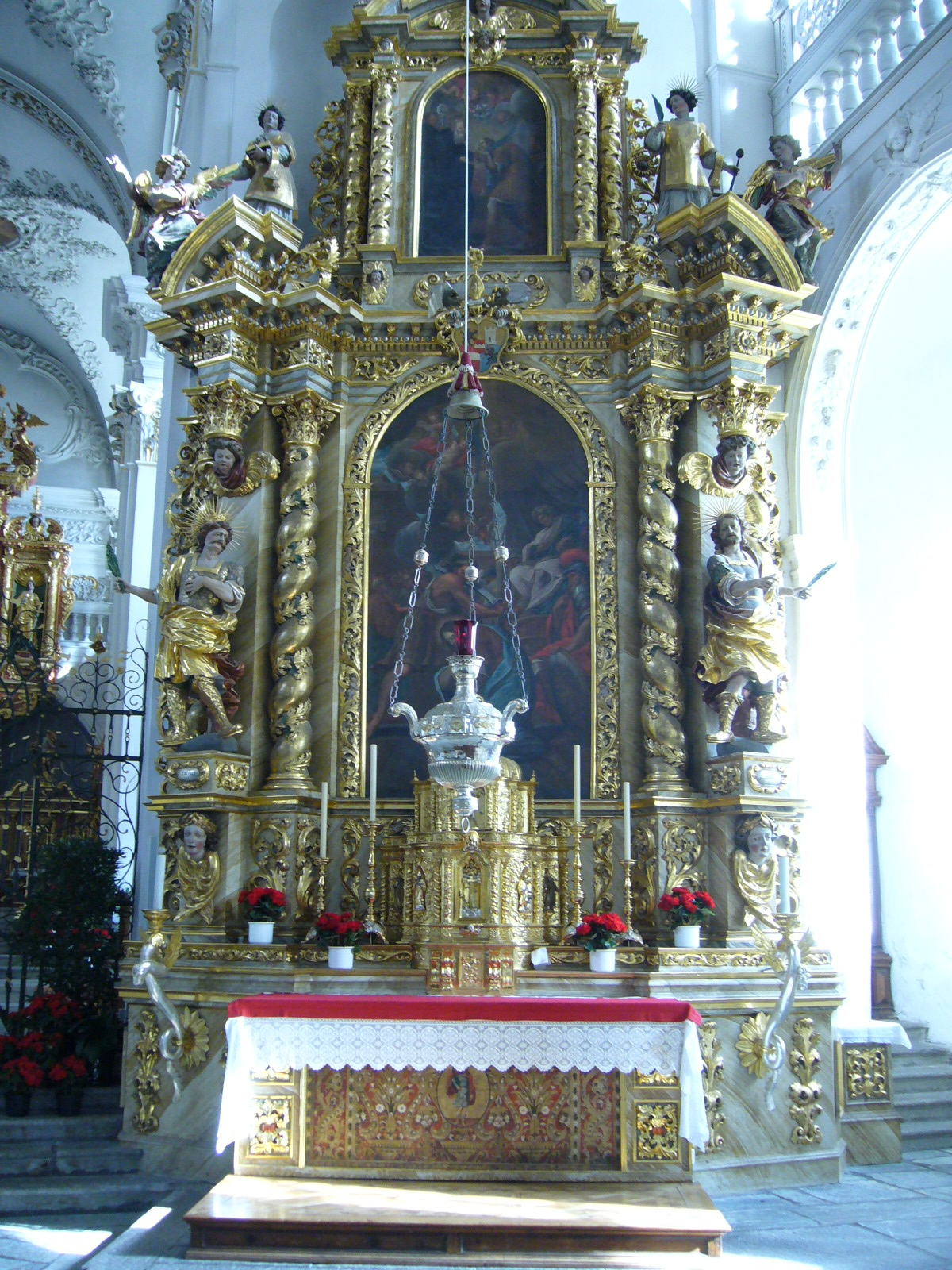
Altar of Placidus

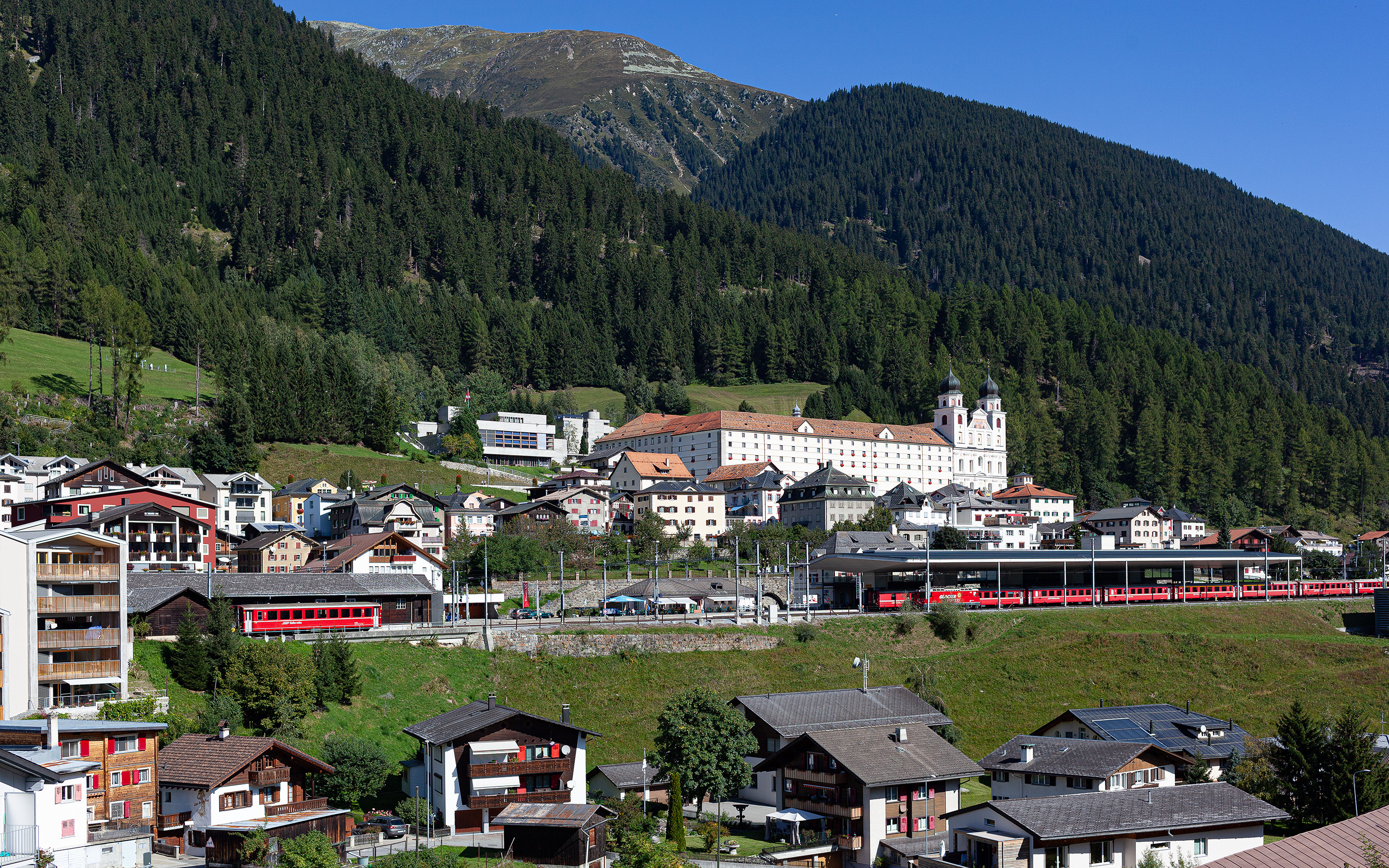
Disentis Abbey, view from Via Lucmagn

== See also ==
- Raetia Curiensis
- Cadi (Surselva)
- St Benedict's Chapel, Sumvitg

== Sources ==
- Condrau, G., 1996. Disentis/Mustér: Geschichte und Gegenwart.
- Jacobsen. W., et al., 1991. Vorromische Kirchenbauten (Suppl.), pp. 93–95.
- Müller, I., 1971. Geschichte der Abtei Disentis von den Anfängen bis zur Gegenwart.
- Müller, I., 1986. Die Frühzeit des Klosters Disentis in BM, 1-45, HS III/1, pp. 474–512.
- "Disentis" in German, French and Italian in the online Historical Dictionary of Switzerland.
