= Musée Courbet =

Biographical museum in Ornans

Coordinates: 47.104974°N 6.147721°E

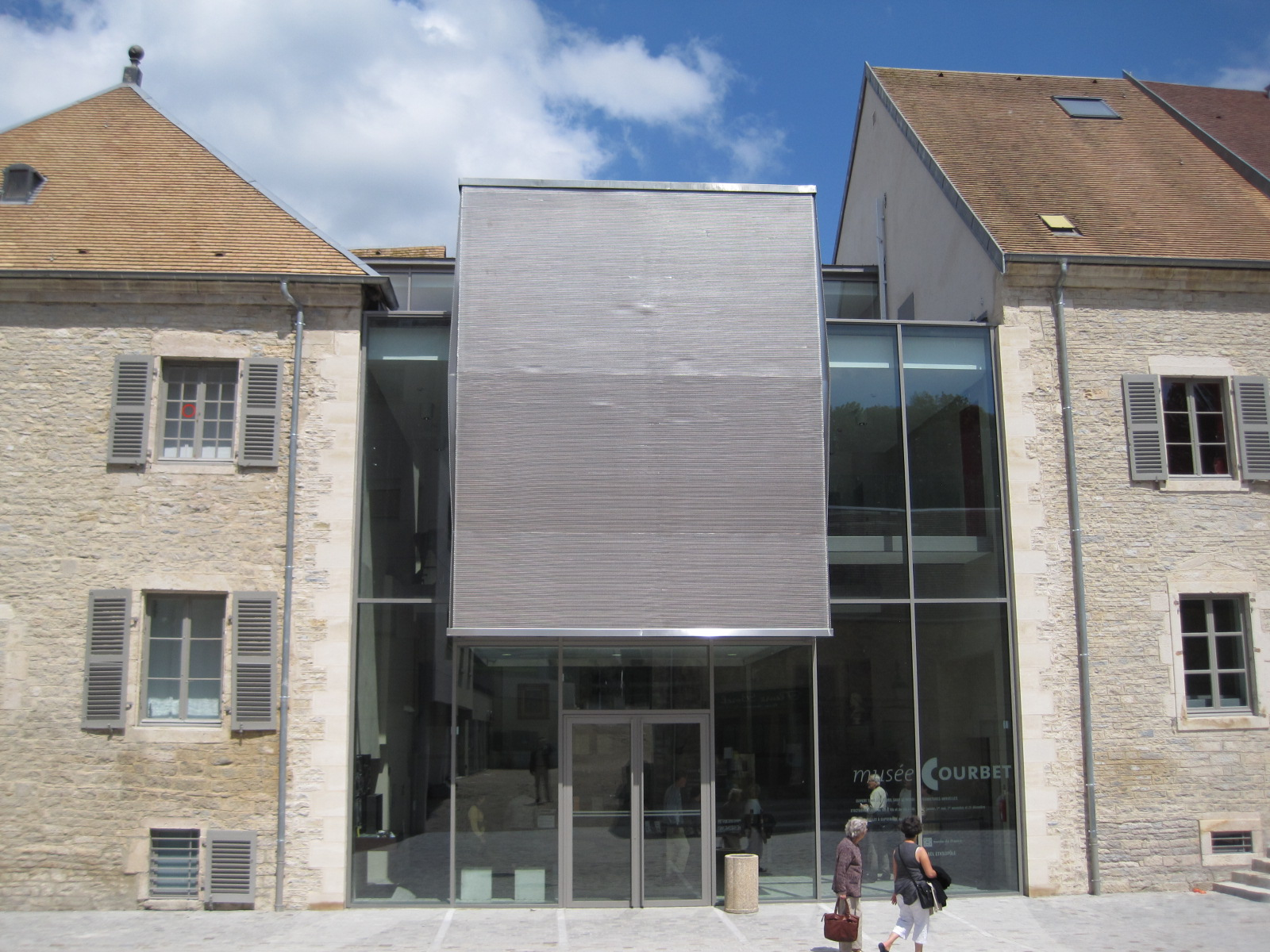
- Entrance of the Musée Courbet
- Established: 1971
- Location: Place Robert Fernier, 1
- Type: Art museum
- Director: Frédérique Thomas-Maurin
- Website: www2.doubs.fr/ Musée Courbet

The Musée Courbet or Courbet Museum is a museum dedicated to the French painter Gustave Courbet. It is located in Ornans in the Doubs-Franche-Comté area of France.

== History ==
The Musée Courbet occupies the birthplace of French realist painter Gustave Courbet, at the Hôtel Hébert, and has about 80 permanent works of the artist. It is located at 1 Place Robert Fernier in Ornans, France. Its creation took place in 1971, due to the efforts of Robert Fernier, a painter, who was its first curator. Fernier also published two volumes of the Courbet catalogue raisonné. The museum became property of the Doubs department in 1976. It was completely renovated and enlarged between 2008 and 2011, and at the same time, annexed the Borel house and the Hotel Champereux, enlarging its surface to more than 2,000 m2, including 1,000 m2 and 21 permanent and temporary exhibition rooms.

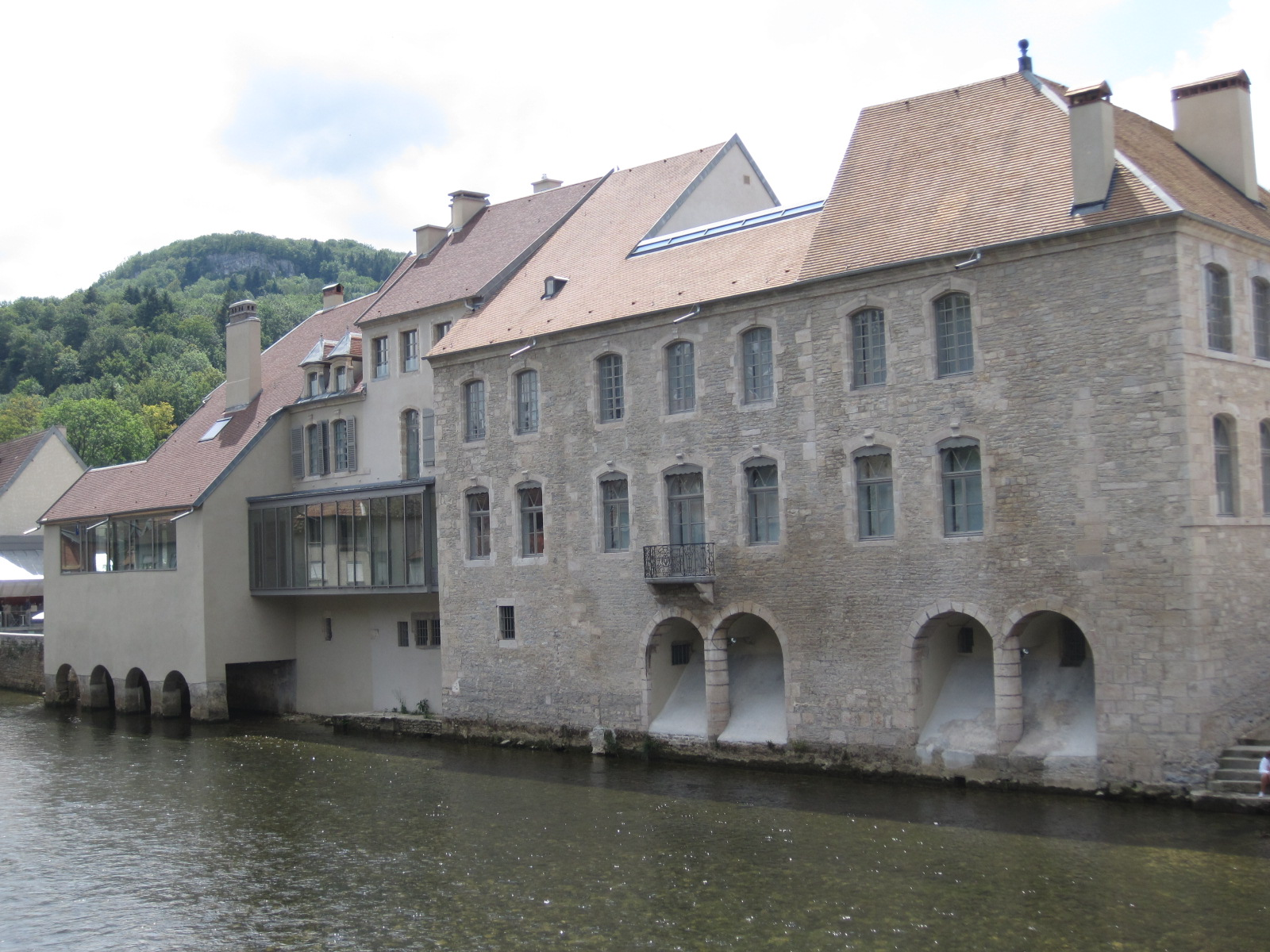
Musée Courbet view from the Loue River

At the beginning of the 20th century, Courbet's sister, Juliette, failed to create a Courbet Museum in Ornans. In 1947, the painter Robert Fernier created it in the premises of the town hall, where five paintings were displayed. Two other rooms came to enlarge the museum in 1957. In 1969, the birthplace of Courbet, the Hôtel Hébert, was for sale. The Society of Friends of Courbet, founded in 1937 by Fernier, acquired this house, located at the edge of the river of Loue, to install the museum there. On September 10, 1971, the museum was inaugurated by the Minister of Cultural Affairs, Jacques Duhamel. In 1976, the General Council of Doubs acquired the collections and the walls to ensure its durability. Robert Fernier, first curator of the museum, died in 1977, and his son, Jean-Jacques Fernier, succeeded him until 2008. The acquisition of two terraced houses, the Champereux hotel in 1994 and the Borel house in 2003, allowed the expansion of the museum.

Work was undertaken from 2008 for an overall amount of 9.2 million euros to the charge of the Doubs department with the help of the Regional Council of Franche-Comté (2 million euros), the State French (1.28 million euros) and the large loan (300,000 euros). After three years of closure, the Courbet Museum reopened on July 2, 2011, with a surface area of 500 m2 to 2,000 m2, with the addition of the two adjoining historic buildings acquired beforehand.

Since 2014, the Musée d'Orsay has signed a partnership with the museum, and this role of "godfather" consists of a scientific partnership and, among others, to accompany the loans of the museum on the national and international level.

== Architecture ==
The building was made in the 16th century; it was restored in the 18th century by the Hébert family. It saw the birth of the painter Gustave Courbet on June 10, 1819. A large part of the interior design (kitchen, bedroom, fireplaces) is registered as a historic monument by decree of 19 February 1982.

The museum was bought in 2008 by the General Council of Doubs, which undertook major renovation and expansion between 2008 and 2011, according to the plans of the architect Christine Edeikins.

== Permanent collection ==
The permanent collection, completely restored during the closure of the museum from 2008 to 2011, is composed of 75 works (paintings, drawings, sculptures, letters, archives), including 41 paintings and four sculptures of Courbet, the rest being the work of artists such as his friends Max Claudet and Max Buchon, his teacher Claude-Antoine Beau, or his followers such as Louis-Augustin Auguin, Marcel Ordinary and Cherubino Pata, representing a total of more than 200 pieces.

Among the paintings of Courbet exposed, the one entitled Vue d'Ornans or Le Mirroir de Ornans, painted around 1872, is listed "MNR 181": it is a work recovered at the end of the Second World War, and filed on January 19, 1953, by order of the Ministry of National Education.

In 2013, the museum acquired The Oak at Flagey (1864) from the Japanese collector, Michimasa Murauchi, for four million euros. The money was raised from local citizens, local businesses, the local government, and the French state.

== See also ==
- List of single-artist museums
