= Abbans-Dessous =

- Commune
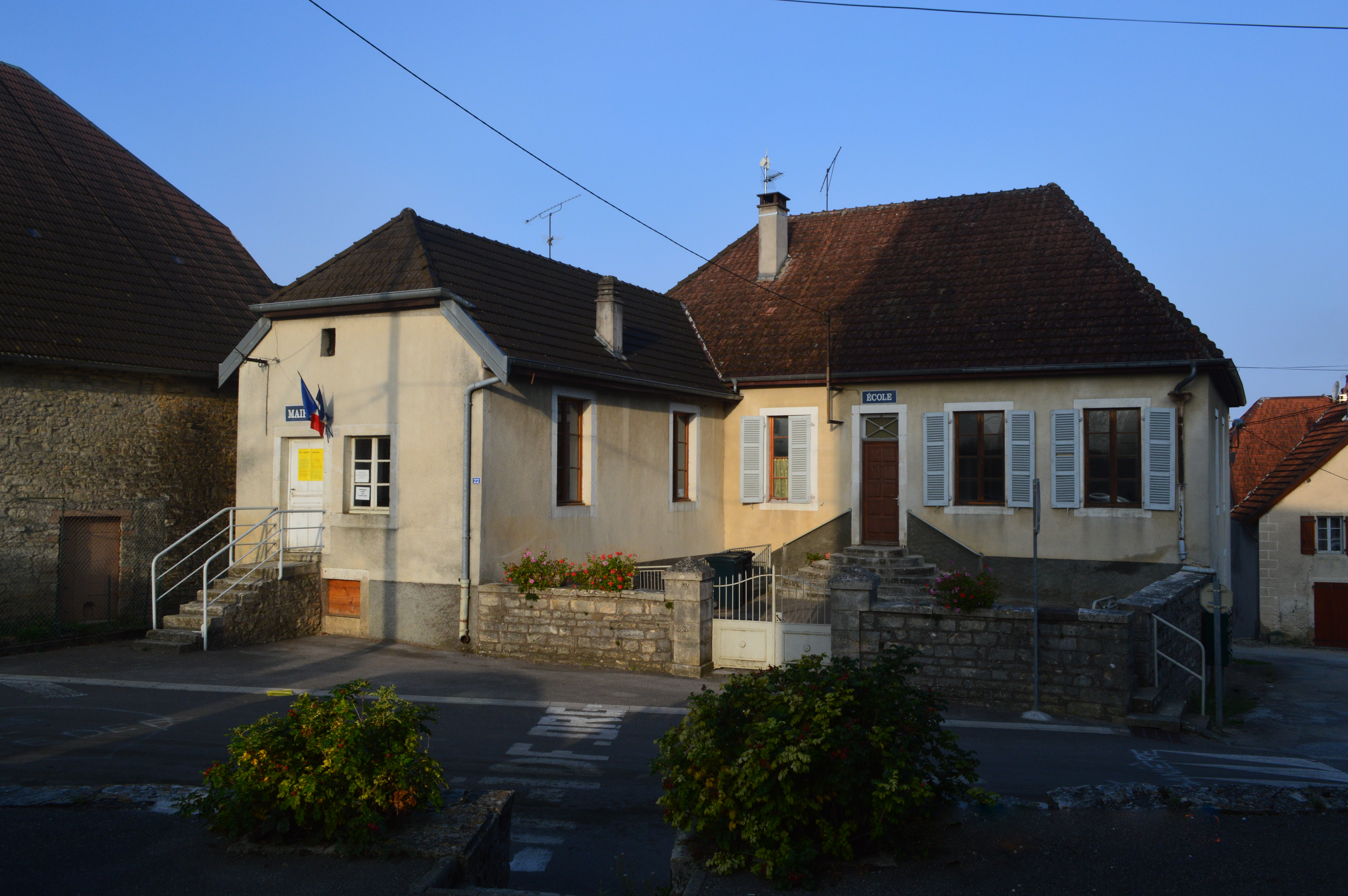
- The Town Hall
- Location of Abbans-Dessous
- Location within France Location within Bourgogne-Franche-Comté
- Coordinates: 47°08′03″N 5°52′31″E
- Country: France
- Region: Bourgogne-Franche-Comté
- Department: Doubs
- Arrondissement: Besançon
- Canton: Saint-Vit
- Intercommunality: Loue-Lison

Government
  - Mayor (2020–2026): Chantal Viprey
- Area^{1}: 3.2 km^{2} (1.2 sq mi)
- Highest elevation: 315 m (1,033 ft)
- Lowest elevation: 220 m (720 ft)
- Population (2023): 250
  - Density: 78/km^{2} (200/sq mi)
- Demonym(s): Abbanais, Abbanaises
- Time zone: UTC+01:00 (CET)
  - Summer (DST): UTC+02:00 (CEST)
- INSEE/Postal code: 25001 /25320
- ^{1} French Land Register data, which excludes lakes, ponds, glaciers > 1 km^{2} (0.386 sq mi or 247 acres) and river estuaries.

Abbans-Dessous is a commune in the Doubs department in the Bourgogne-Franche-Comté region of eastern France.

The similarly named commune Abbans-Dessus lies 1.5 km to the south.

== Geography ==
Abbans-Dessous is located some 20 km south-west of Besançon and 2 km south-east of Osselle. Access to the commune is by road D105 from Byans-sur-Doubs in the south-east passing through the commune and the village and continuing north-east to Boussières. The D466 road goes south-east from the village then north-east to join the D107 at the north-eastern corner of the commune. The commune is mixed forest and farmland.

The commune is situated on the south bank of the river Doubs where it loops south after flowing from the Jura Mountains in Switzerland in a U-shaped course through Besançon before passing along the northern border of Abbans-Dessous then feeding into the river Saône at Verdun-sur-le-Doubs.

=== Toponymy ===
Abbans appears in the forms:

- Habens in 1148;
- Abans in 1182;
- Abbans in 1250;
- Abbans villa in 1252;
- Abens-la-Ville in 1278;
- Abbantum in 1297;
- Abbans in 1368;
- Abbans-la-Ville in 1629

The name is based on a German man's name Abbo with the Germanic suffix -ing.

== History ==
The history of Abbans-Dessous (previously called Abbans-la-Ville) can not be separated from that of Abbans-Dessus (previously called Abbans-le-Château). At the lower end is a church surrounded by a cemetery, the priory of Lieu-Dieu, a mill on the Doubs river; at the upper end are the two châteaux - Front and Rear - which preceded their respective villages.

== Administration ==
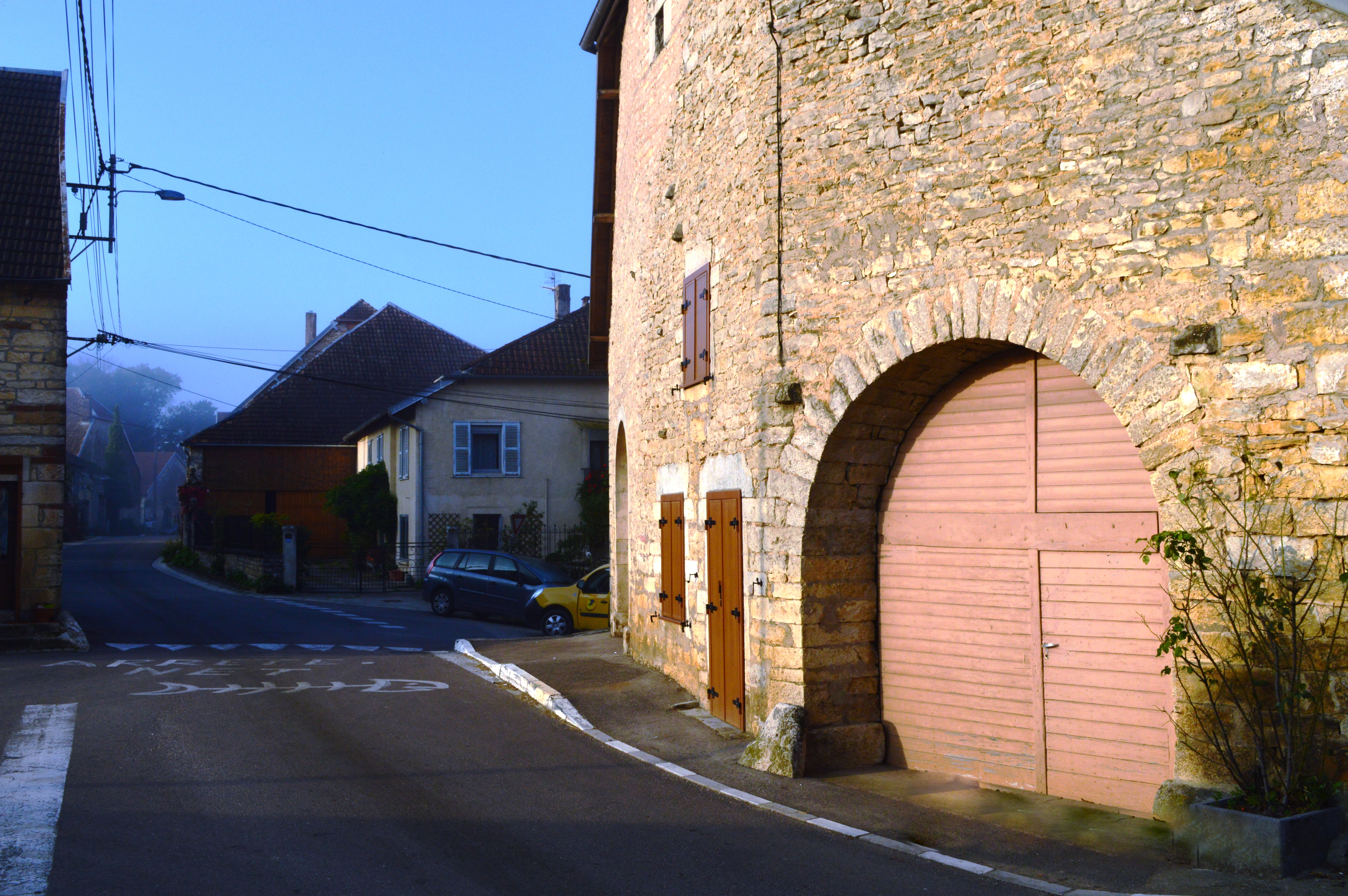
A street in Abbans-Dessous

List of Successive Mayors of Abbans-Dessous

From	To	Name
2001	2014	Claude Vuaillat
2014	Current	Chantal Viprey

=== Intercommunality ===
Abbans-Dessous is a member of the Community of communes Loue-Lison, which was created on 1 January 2017. It comprises 72 communes, and has its seat in Ornans.

== Population ==
The inhabitants of the commune are known as Abbanais or Abbanaises in French.

Historical population

Year	Pop.	±% p.a.
1793	229	—
1821	225	−0.06%
1846	211	−0.26%
1872	193	−0.34%
1901	186	−0.13%
1926	147	−0.94%
1946	135	−0.42%
1962	130	−0.24%
1968	132	+0.25%

Year	Pop.	±% p.a.
1975	112	−2.32%
1982	138	+3.03%
1990	151	+1.13%
1999	174	+1.59%
2007	241	+4.16%
2012	234	−0.59%
2017	263	+2.36%
2023	250	−0.84%

Source: EHESS and INSEE

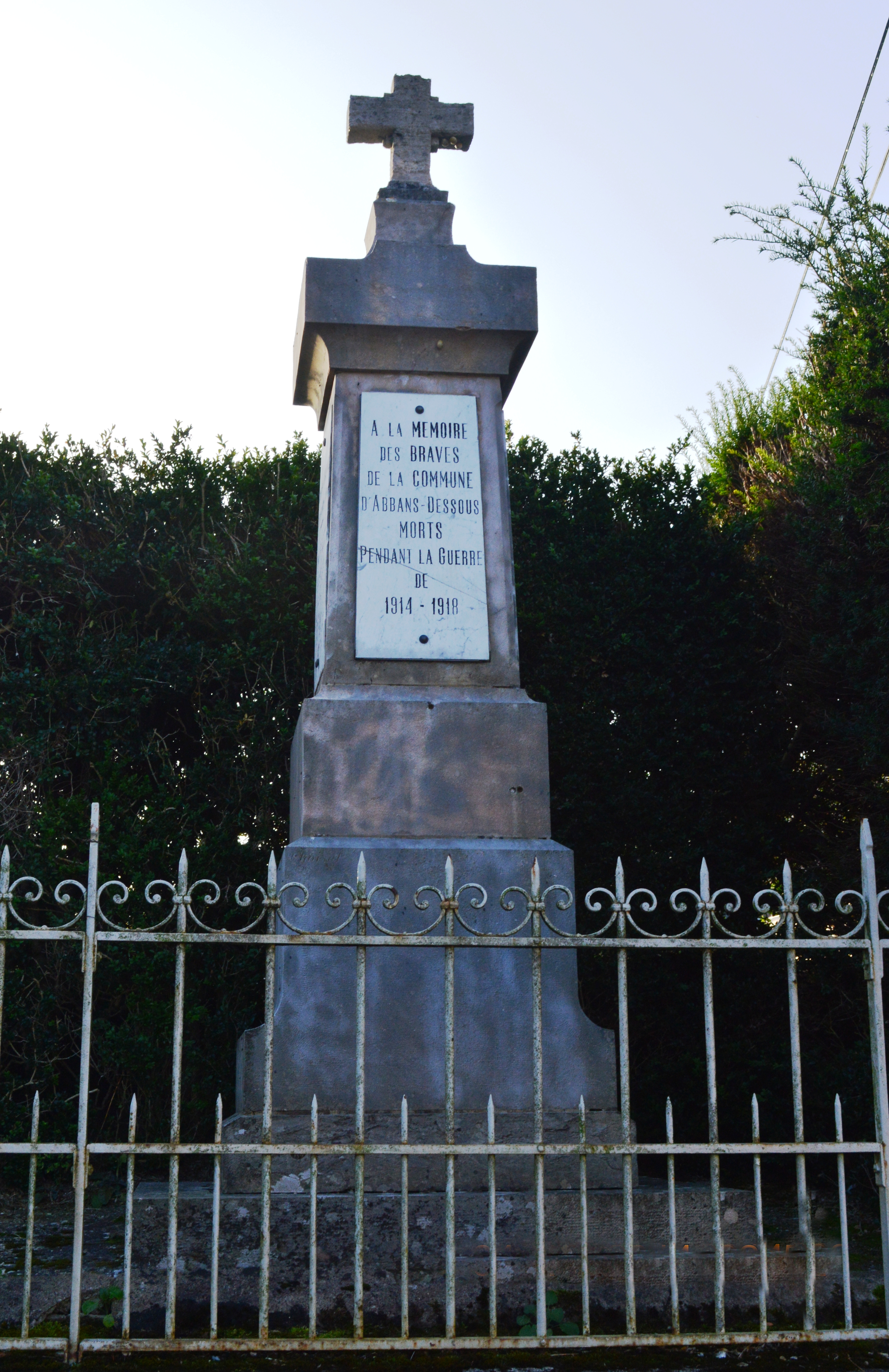
Abbans-Dessous War Memorial

== Sites and monuments ==
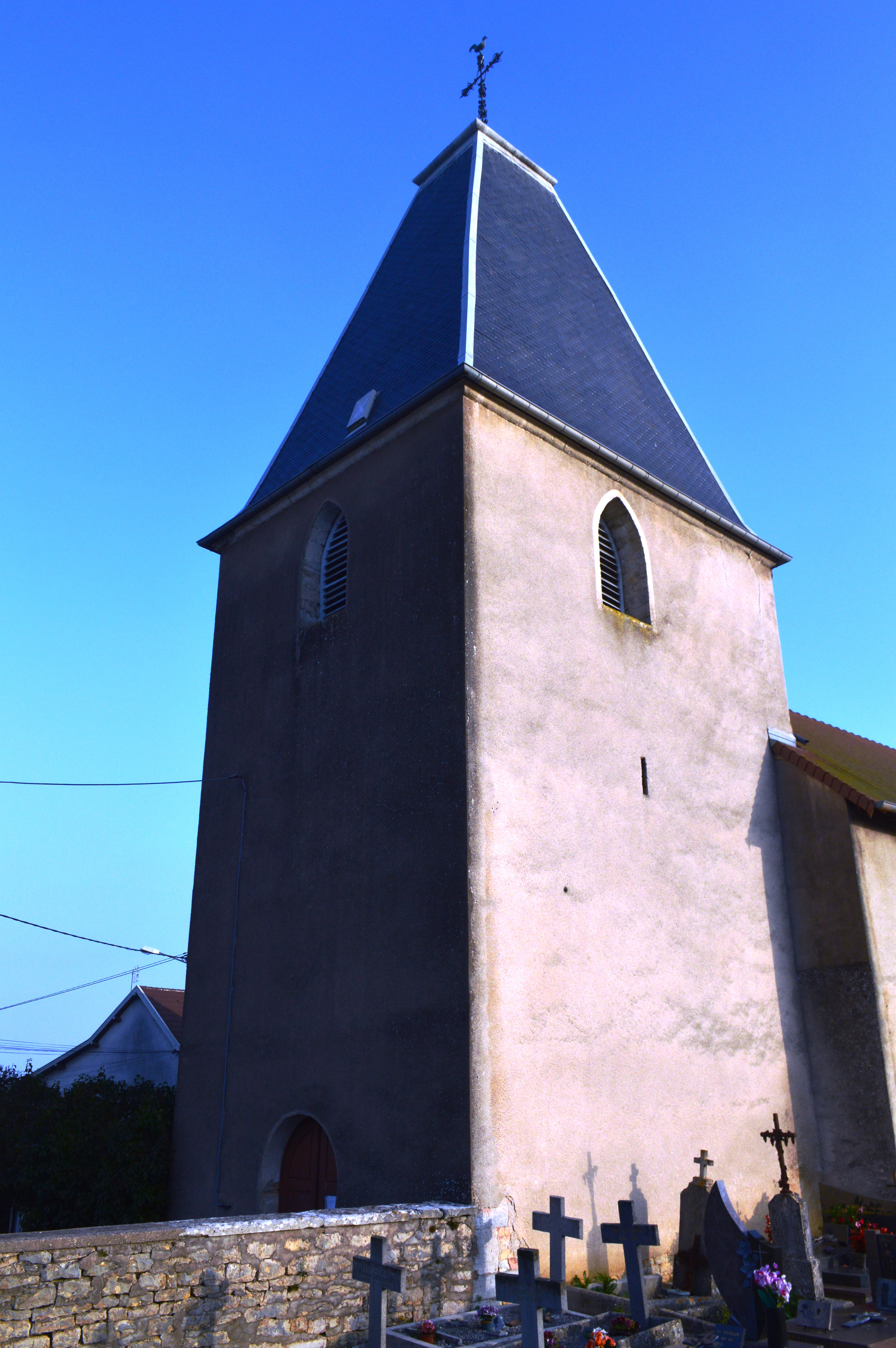
The Priory of Lieu-Dieu

- The Priory of Lieu-Dieu (11th century) is listed as a historical monument. The church contains the Tombstone of Jean d'Abbans (knight) (14th century) which is listed as a historical object.

== See also ==
- Communes of the Doubs department
