= Abbans-Dessus =

- Commune
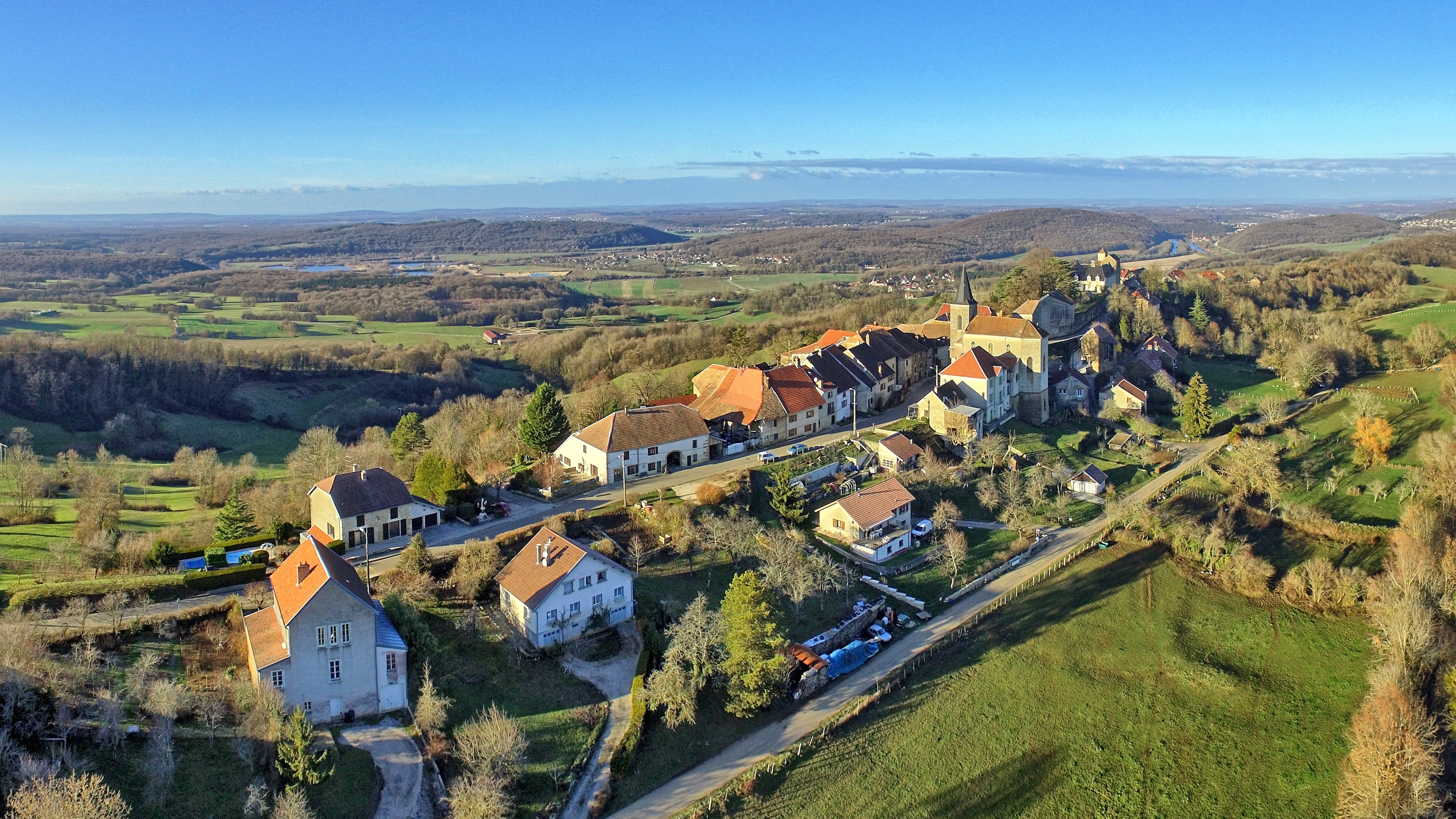
- General view of the village

- Coat of arms
- Location of Abbans-Dessus
- Location within France Location within Bourgogne-Franche-Comté
- Coordinates: 47°07′15″N 5°52′56″E
- Country: France
- Region: Bourgogne-Franche-Comté
- Department: Doubs
- Arrondissement: Besançon
- Canton: Saint-Vit
- Intercommunality: Loue-Lison

Government
  - Mayor (2020–2026): Florence Paul
- Area^{1}: 4.43 km^{2} (1.71 sq mi)
- Highest elevation: 470 m (1,540 ft)
- Lowest elevation: 268 m (879 ft)
- Population (2023): 282
  - Density: 63.7/km^{2} (165/sq mi)
- Demonym(s): Abbanais, Abbanaises
- Time zone: UTC+01:00 (CET)
  - Summer (DST): UTC+02:00 (CEST)
- INSEE/Postal code: 25002 /25440
- ^{1} French Land Register data, which excludes lakes, ponds, glaciers > 1 km^{2} (0.386 sq mi or 247 acres) and river estuaries.

Abbans-Dessus is a commune in the Doubs department in the Bourgogne-Franche-Comté region in eastern France.

The similarly named commune Abbans-Dessous lies 1.5 km to the north.

== Geography ==
Abbans-Dessus is located some 20 km south-west of Besançon and 3 km north of Quingey on the hills between Le Doubs River to the north-west and the Loue river to the south-east in the west of the Doubs department. The D13 road from Byans-sur-Doubs to Chouzelot passes through the south of the commune. Access to the village is by the D107 which branches off the D13 and goes north to the village continuing north to join the D105 north-east of Abbans-Dessous. The commune is long and narrow oriented north-east with bands of forest lining the long borders and the rest of the commune is farmland.

An unnamed stream rises in the south of the commune and flows north to join the Doubs river to join the Doubs river north-east of Abbans-Dessous. Abbans-Dessus is located midway between the Loue and Doubs rivers although it does not border on either river but overlooks the Doubs river.

=== Toponymy ===
The name Abbans is based on a German man's name Abbo with the Germanic suffix -ing.

== History ==
The village is built on a rocky outcrop overlooking the forest of Chaux and the Doubs valley. It is likely, in view of its strategic location, that it was a Gallo-Roman oppidum. Abbans-Dessus has a highly visible castle that is well known as the Keep where the Marquis Jouffroy d'Abbans, the inventor of the steamboat, largely conceived his work. There is mention made of the building in 1091. It belonged to the Lords of Abbans, important figures in the region's history. When, at the end of the 13th century, the sons of Philippe d'Abbans inherited the lordship, they created a "Front-Village" and a "Back-Village" The "Back Castle" passed to William and Richard built the "Front Castle" nearby. In 1290 Richard's daughter chose to sell the Front Castle to John I of Chalon-Arlay and in 1297 he granted Abbans a franchise charter.

Abbans-Dessus was a cereal crops and livestock farming area. Viticulture was established in the commune until the 19th century when it was totally eradicated by phylloxera.

== Heraldry and Genealogy of the Squires of Abbans ==
=== Heraldry ===
Arms of the House of Abbans	The House of Abbans (or Habens) took its name from a castle in the Bailiwick of Quingey. It was one of four houses that had right of burial in the Church of Saint-Étienne in the town. Blason: Argent, a cross in gules, with two roses the same in chief.

=== Genealogy ===
Humbert Abbans (? – after 1134). Marriage and succession: His wife is unknown, he had two sons:

- Hubald
- Roger

Hubald of Abbans (? – after 1143), Squire and Lord of Abbans.

He was mentioned in a charter of 1143, in which the Pope Lucius II confirmed the rights of the Church of Saint-Madeleine in Besançon: "Dimidium Mansum, in castris Toragii vestre terre, quod expugnastis duello, contra Hubaldum of Habens".

Marriage and succession: His wife is unknown, he had two sons:

- Louis I of Abbans
- Olivier d'Abbans, knight, benefactor of the Cherlieu Abbey in the diocese of Besançon, father of Louis II.

Louis I of Abbans (? – after 1157), Lord of Abbans, knight and squire, he donated to the Abbey Notre-Dame of Billon and was confirmed in 1156. Marriage and succession: His wife is unknown, he had four sons:

- Humbert II
- Thiebaud, (? – before 1190)
- Olivier, abbot of the Monastery of Luxeuil from 1189 to 1201, Vicar-General of the diocese of Besançon in the absence of the Archbishop Thierry II of Montfaucon who left for the Third Crusade during which he died of the plague in 1191
- Otto, who died childless.

Humbert II of Abbans (? – after 1182), Squire and Knight, Lord of Abbans, Purgerot, and Augicour. Marriage and succession: His wife is unknown, he had one son and one daughter:

- Louis II
- Julienne, she married Lambert of Cicon.

Louis II of Abbans (? – after 1235), squire and knight, Lord of Abbans. His seal attached to a deed of gift to the Cherlieu Abbey, of a horse, armed and with a banner in his arms. Marriage and succession: His wife is unknown, he had 3 sons and 3 daughters:

- Philippe
- Richard (? – 1281), Knight, Lord of Abbans, Villers-Saint-Georges, and Noironte.
- Guillaume, a Knight
- Nicolette
- Willemette
- Odilette

Philippe of Abbans knight, Lord of Abbans. In 1224 he joined a number of hostages that John, Count of Chalon, gave to Besançon to guarantee a treaty he had concluded with them. Marriage and succession: He married Richarde, daughter of Richard of Chay and Agnes of Arguel, by whom he had 1 son and 1 daughter:

- Guillaume
- Guillemette, the first wife of Henri de Conflandey and her second husband was Hugh de Montferrand.

Guillaume of Abbans (? – before 1336), Squire and Knight, Lord of Abbans. Marriage and succession: He married Isabella (? – after 1300), daughter of Pons of Cicon and Agnes of Pelousey, with whom he had one son:

- Amiet

Amiet of Abbans (? – August 1314), Squire, Lord of Abbans. Marriage and succession: He married Isabella by whom he had that 1 daughter and 1 son:

- Jeanne, she married Henry de Saint-Aubin (circa 1310 – ?), knight
- Jean (? – 1370), Knight and Squire, Lord of Noironte and Châtillon-le-Duc, he married Marguerite, daughter of Thiebaud Belvoir III and Jeanne de Montfaucon, by whom he had a daughter who passed the chateau of Abbans to Guillaume of Arbon. By inheritance the chateau passed to the Joux family, then the Grammonts and the Jouffroys.

== Administration ==
List of Successive Mayors of Abbans-Dessus

From	To	Name
2001	2014	Michel Guelle
2014	2020	Claude Mareschal
2020	Current	Florence Paul

=== Intercommunality ===
Abbans-Dessus is a member of the Community of communes Loue-Lison, which was created on 1 January 2017. It comprises 72 communes, and has its seat in Ornans.

== Population ==
The inhabitants of the commune are known as Abbanais or Abbanaises in French.

Historical population

Year	Pop.	±% p.a.
1793	216	—
1821	240	+0.38%
1846	211	−0.51%
1872	172	−0.78%
1901	156	−0.34%
1926	105	−1.57%
1946	131	+1.11%
1962	108	−1.20%
1968	107	−0.15%

Year	Pop.	±% p.a.
1975	138	+3.70%
1982	237	+8.03%
1990	242	+0.26%
1999	274	+1.39%
2007	315	+1.76%
2012	304	−0.71%
2017	304	+0.00%
2023	282	−1.24%

Source: EHESS and INSEE

== Sites and monuments ==
- The Chateau de Jouffroy d'Abbans (15th and 18th centuries) is best known for its dungeon, where Claude-François-Dorothée, marquis de Jouffroy d'Abbans (1751–1832) devised the first steamboat with paddlewheels.
- Church of the Assumption
- House
- Street with walls covered in flowers
- Lavoir (Public Laundry)
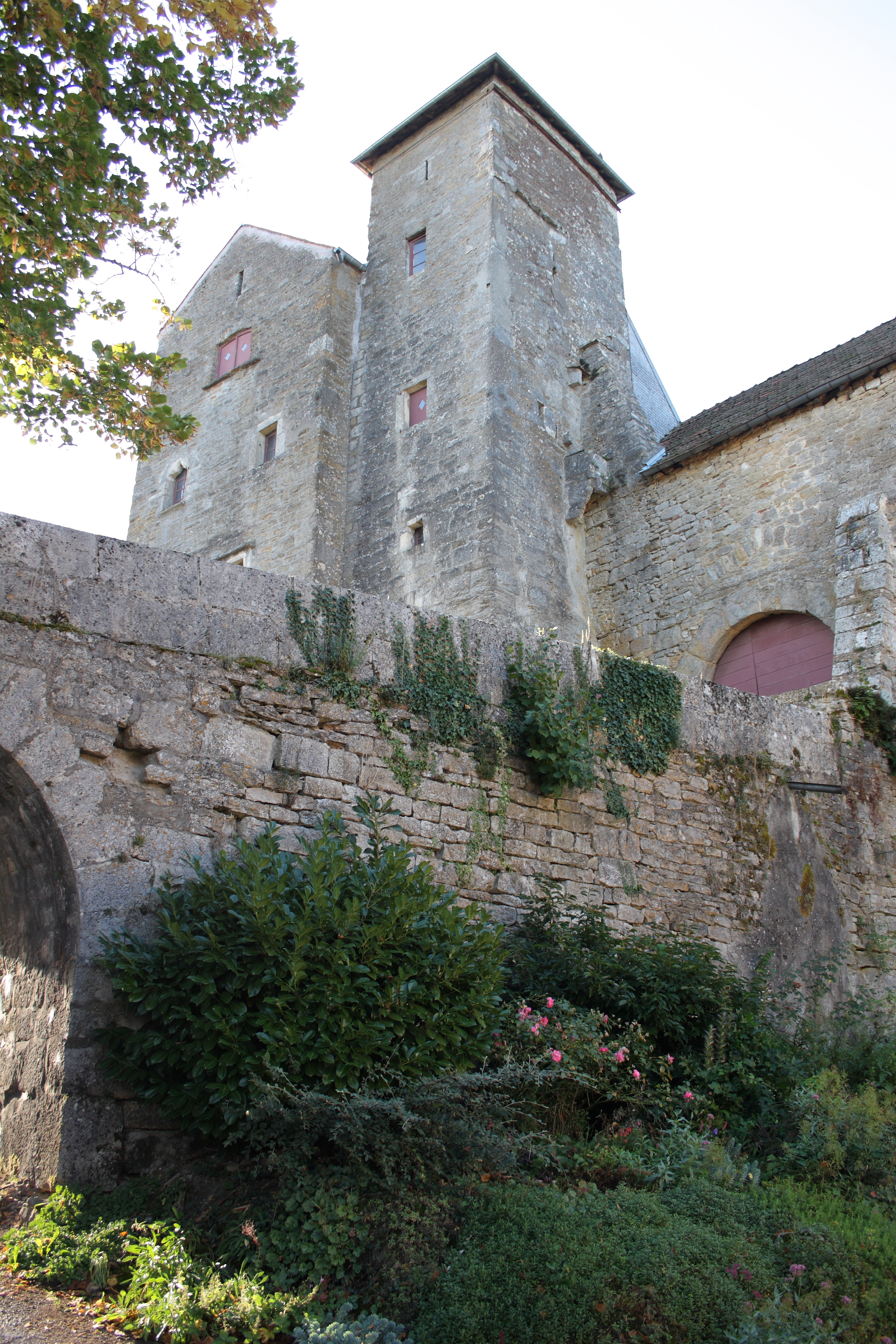
The Castle

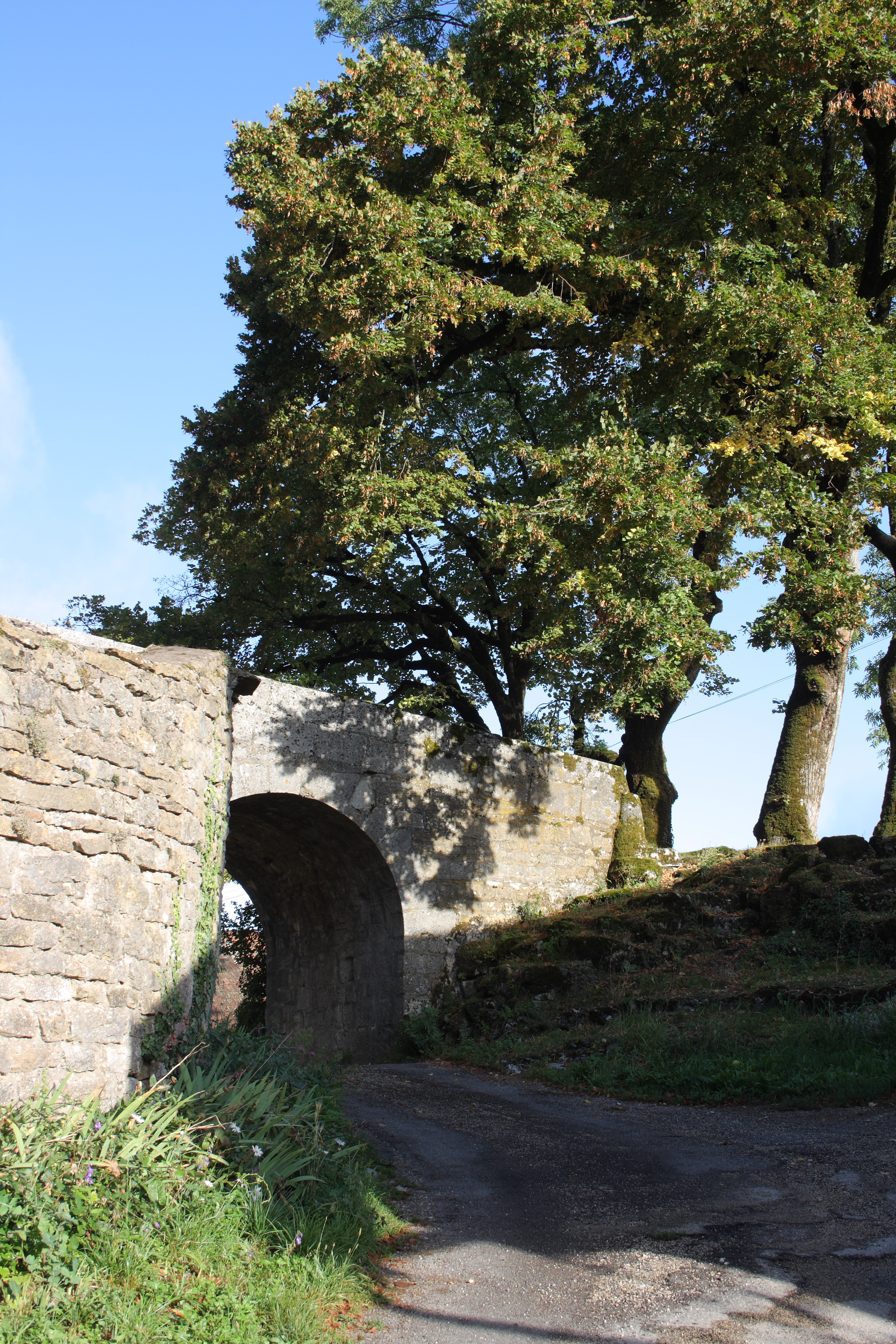
Castle Entrance

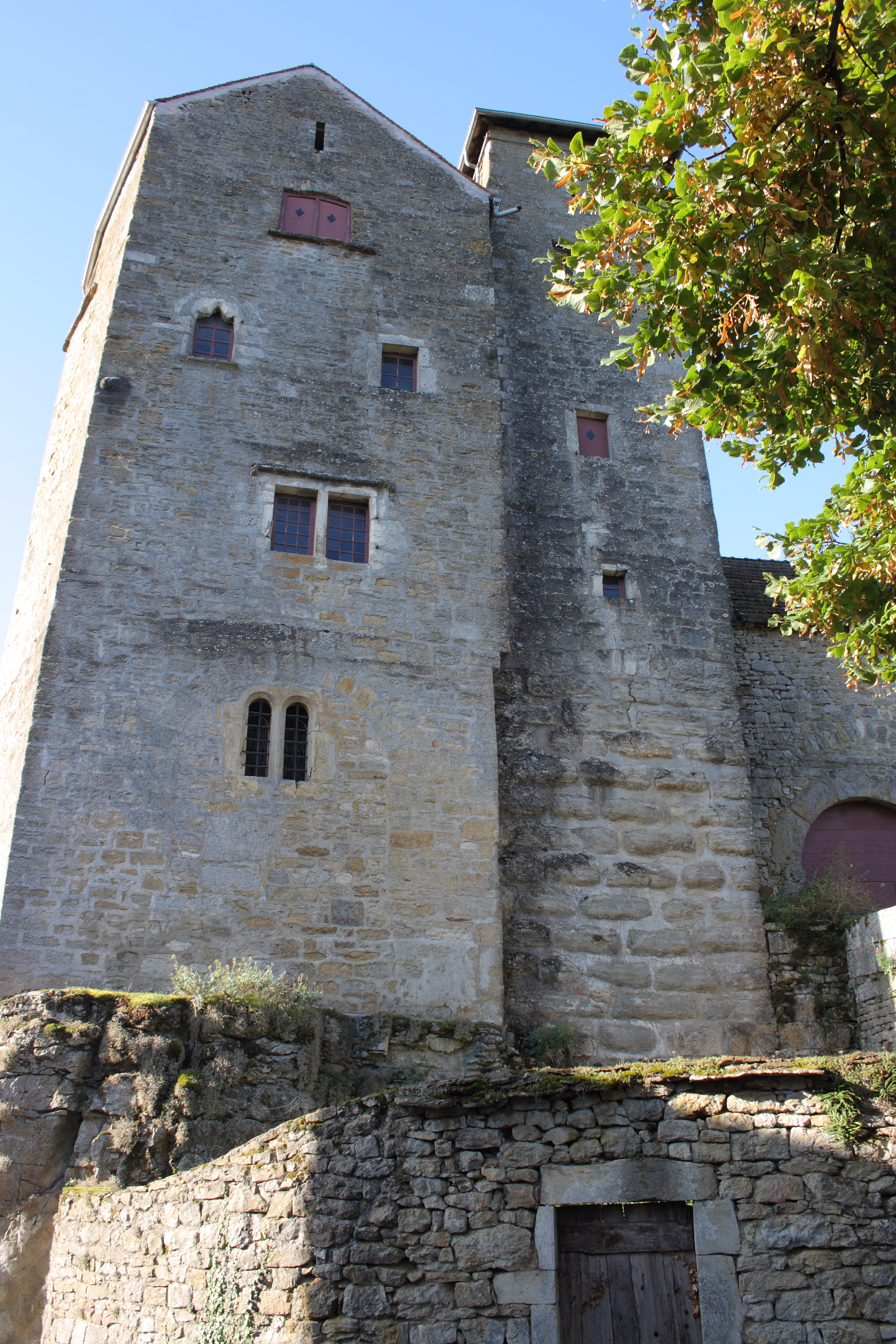
Castle Tower

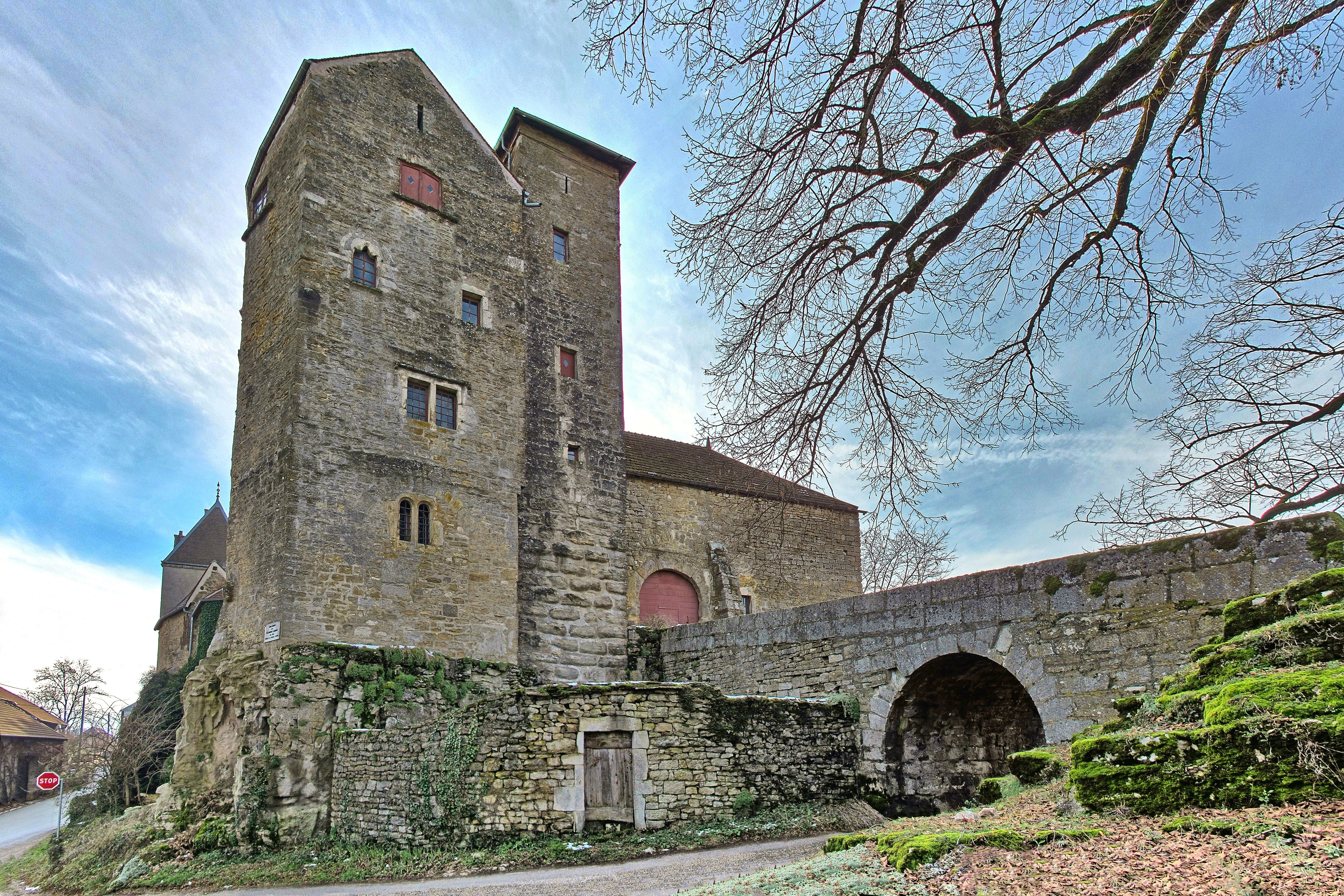
Chateau de Jouffroy

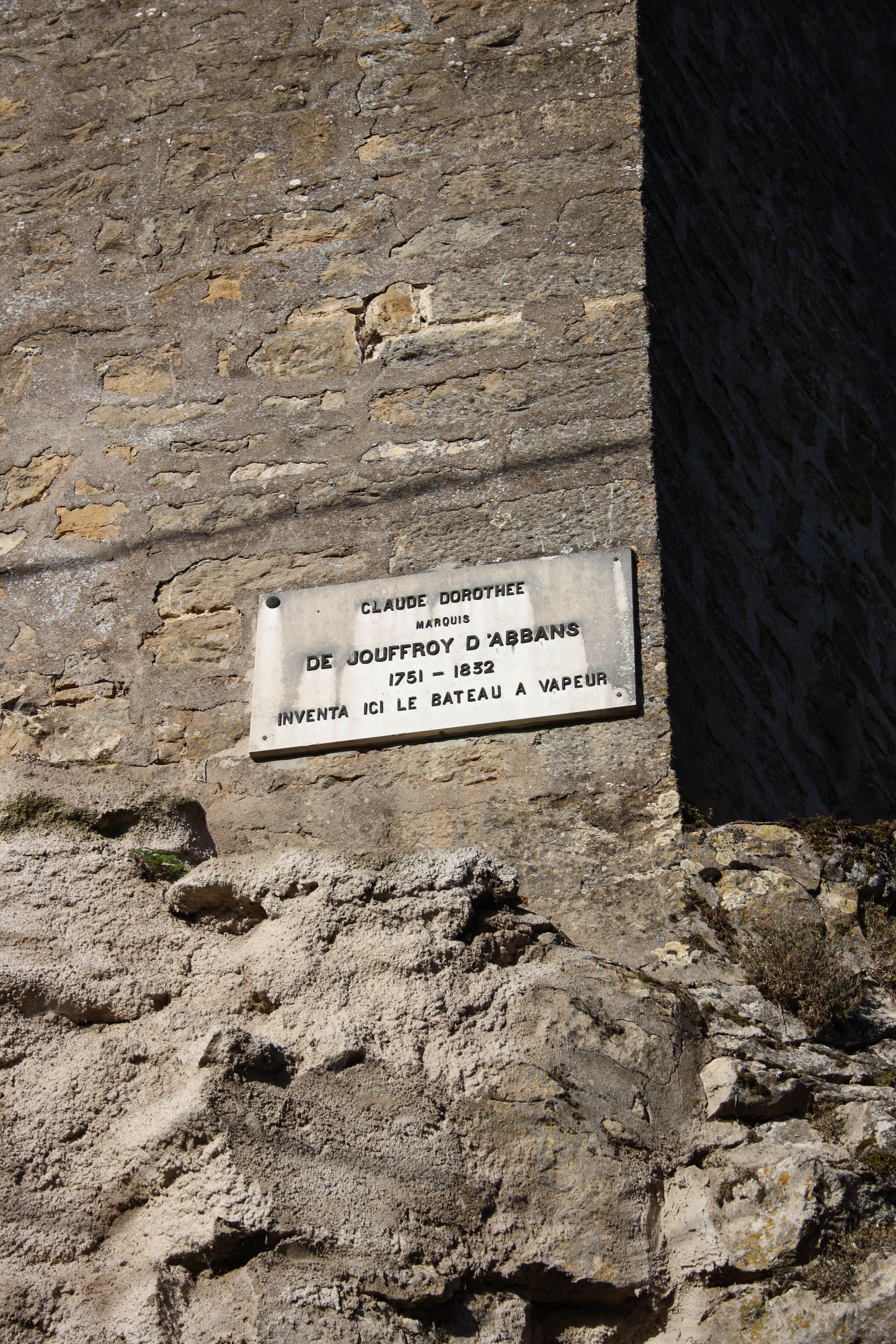
Jouffroy d'Abbans nameplate

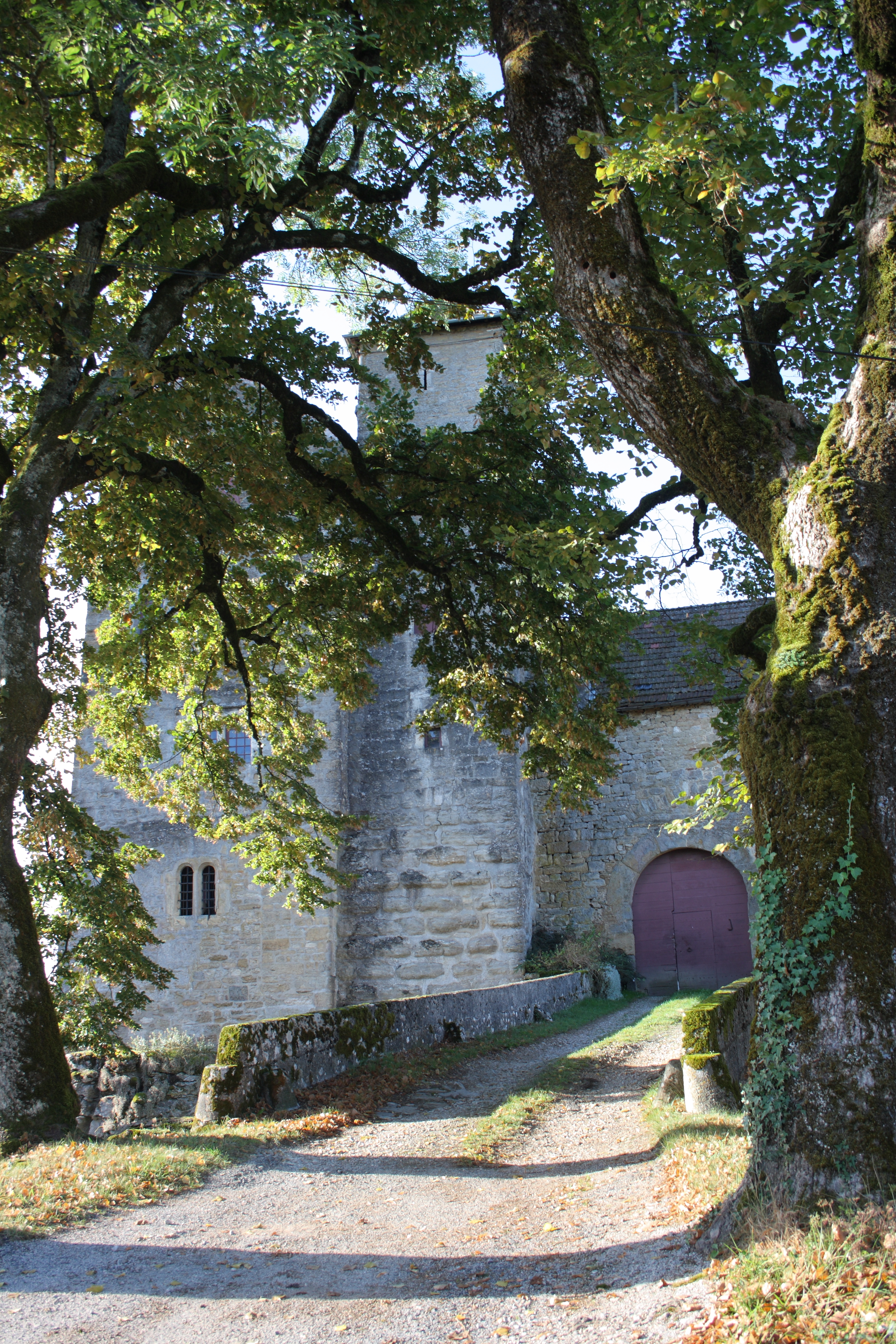
Castle Entrance

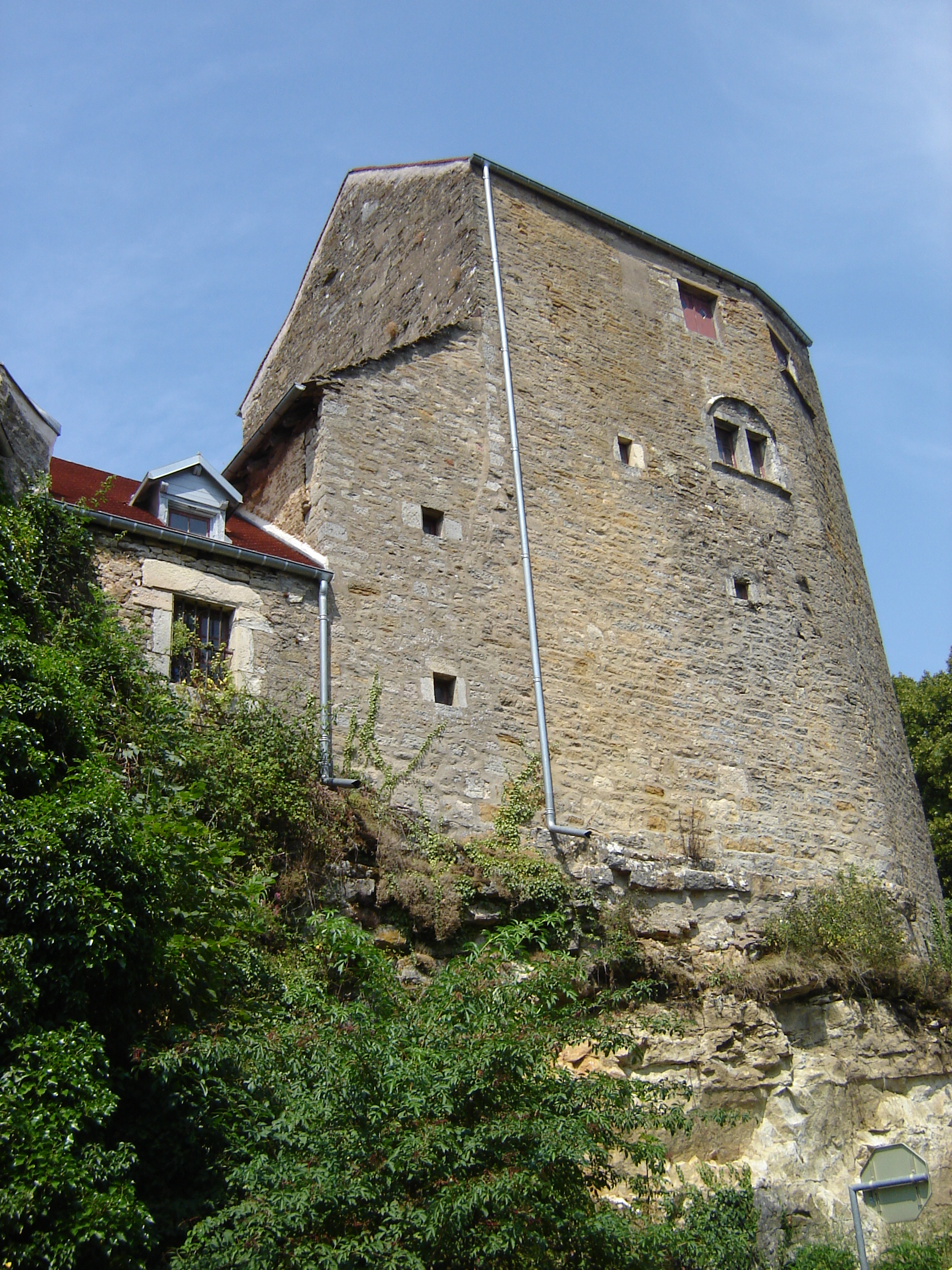
Castle Dungeon

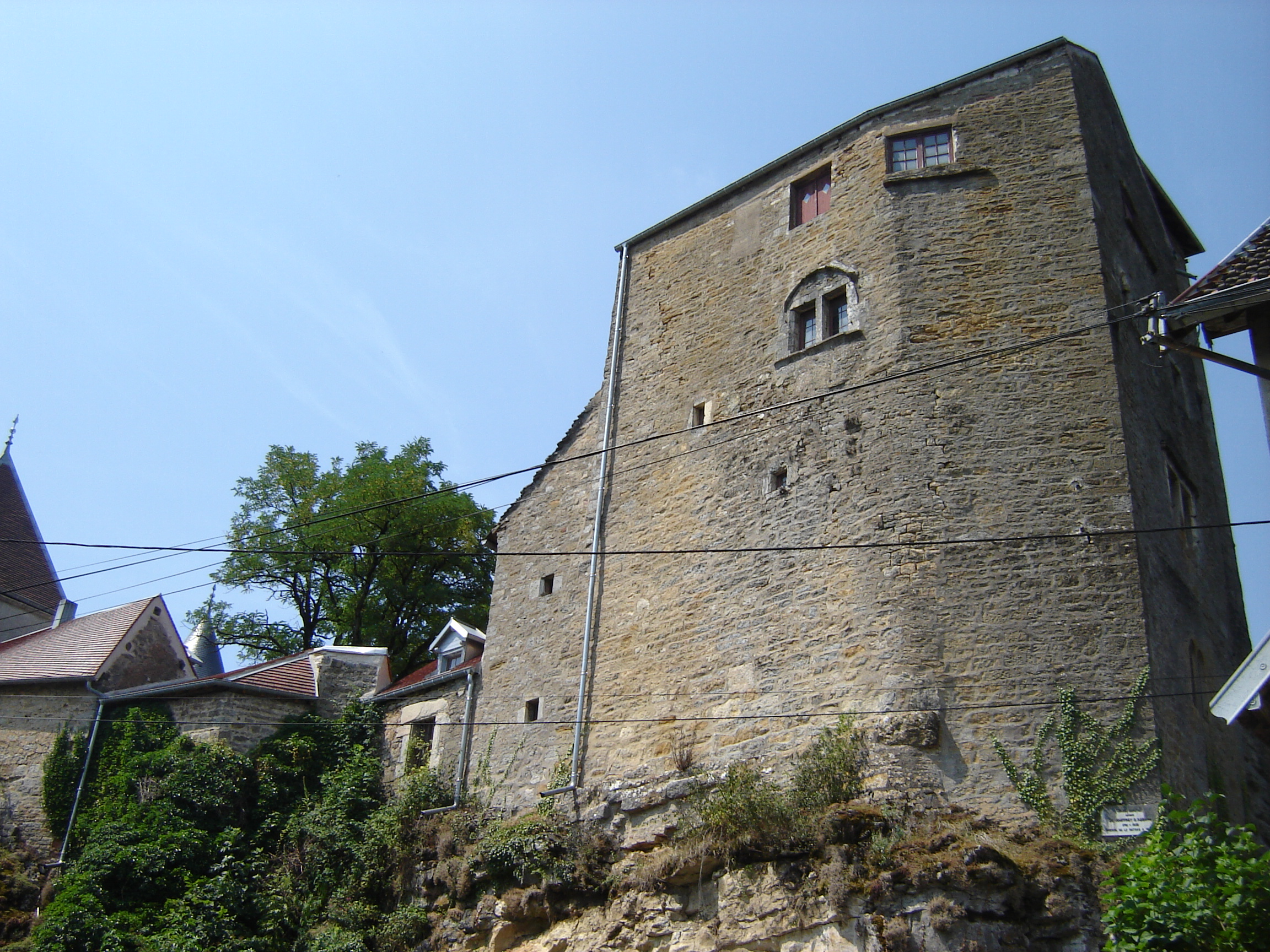
The Dungeon

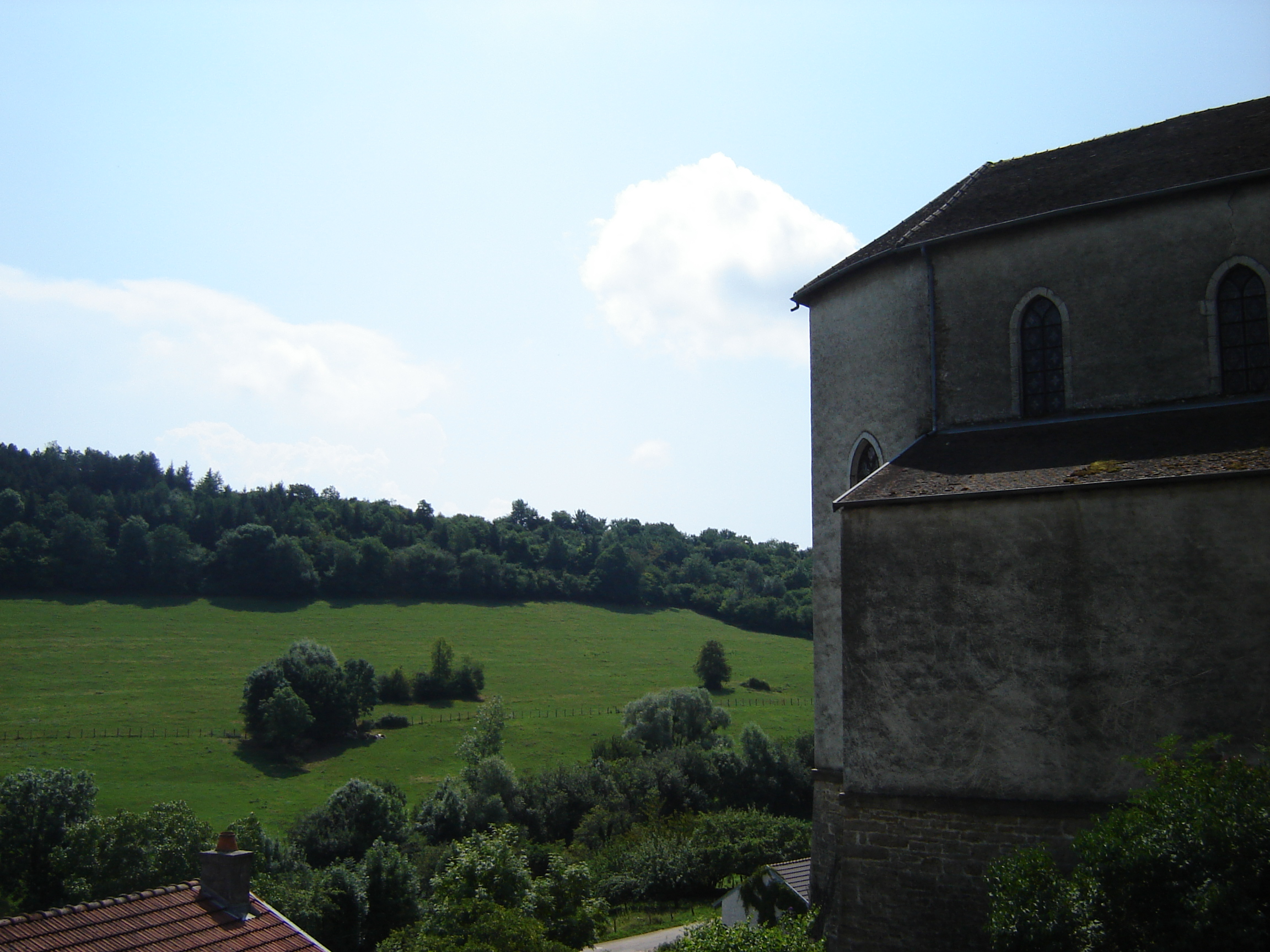
Apse of the Church overlooking the valley

== Notable people linked to the commune ==
- Claude-François-Dorothée, marquis de Jouffroy d'Abbans

=== Bibliography ===
- Genealogical History of the Lords of Salins, Jean-Baptiste Guillaume, Jean-Antoine Vieille, Besançon, 1757, 39 pages (in French)
- Roglo, Lord of Abbans (in French)

== See also ==
- Communes of the Doubs department
