= Foucherans =

Foucherans may refer to:

- Foucherans, Doubs, a commune in the French region of Franche-Comté
- Foucherans, Jura, a commune in the French region of Franche-Comté
