= Bonnevaux =

Bonnevaux is the name or part of the name of several places in France:

== Communes ==
- Bonnevaux, Doubs
- Bonnevaux, Gard
- Bonnevaux, Haute-Savoie
- Bonnevaux-le-Prieuré, in the Doubs department

== Abbeys ==
- Bonnevaux Abbey (Isère), a former Cistercian abbey in the commune of Villeneuve-de-Marc
- Bonnevaux Abbey (Vienne), a former Cistercian abbey in the commune of Marçay, Vienne
