= Tarcenay =

Commune in Doubs, France

- Part of Tarcenay-Foucherans
- Location of Tarcenay
- Location within France Location within Bourgogne-Franche-Comté
- Coordinates: 47°09′25″N 6°06′47″E
- Country: France
- Region: Bourgogne-Franche-Comté
- Department: Doubs
- Arrondissement: Besançon
- Canton: Ornans
- Commune: Tarcenay-Foucherans
- Area^{1}: 13.09 km^{2} (5.05 sq mi)
- Highest elevation: 565 m (1,854 ft)
- Lowest elevation: 409 m (1,342 ft)
- Population (2016): 1,015
  - Density: 77.54/km^{2} (200.8/sq mi)
- Time zone: UTC+01:00 (CET)
  - Summer (DST): UTC+02:00 (CEST)
- Postal code: 25620
- ^{1} French Land Register data, which excludes lakes, ponds, glaciers > 1 km^{2} (0.386 sq mi or 247 acres) and river estuaries.

Tarcenay (French pronunciation: [taʁsənɛ]) is a former commune in the Doubs department in the Bourgogne-Franche-Comté region in eastern France. On 1 January 2019, it was merged into the new commune Tarcenay-Foucherans.

== Geography ==
Tarcenay lies 9 km (5.6 mi) north of Ornans on the first plateau of the Jura Mountains near the Loue.

== Population ==
Historical population
Year	Pop.	±% p.a.
1962	342	—
1968	316	−1.31%
1975	363	+2.00%
1982	462	+3.51%
1990	588	+3.06%
1999	628	+0.73%
2016	1,015	+2.86%
Source: EHESS and INSEE

== See also ==
- Communes of the Doubs department
