= Maison Granvelle =

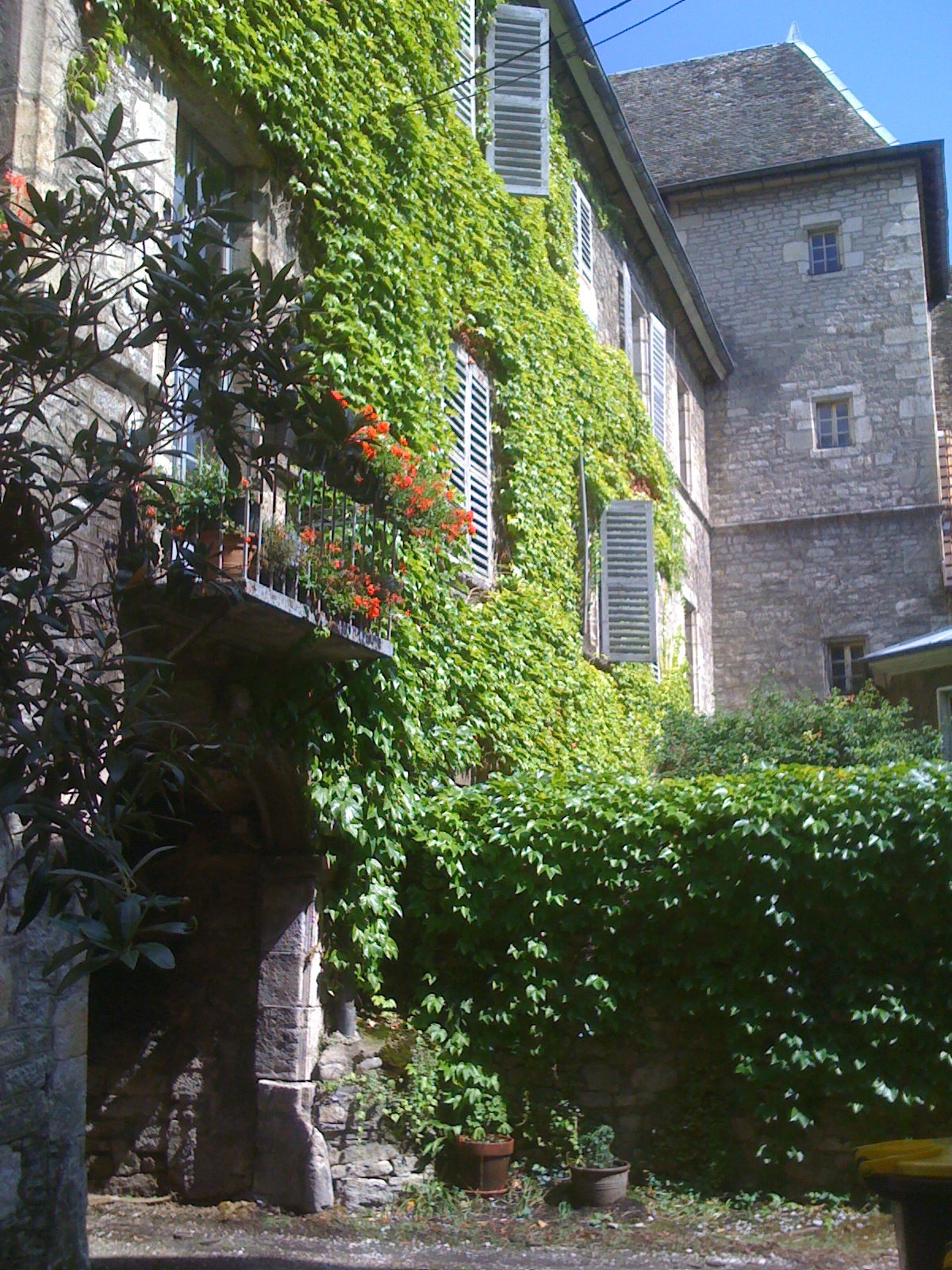
Maison de Granvelle d'Ornans

The House of Granvelle is a protected French Historical Monument located in the village of Ornans, in the French department of Doubs.

== Localisation ==
The house is located at 67 - 77, Rue Pierre-Vernier, in the village of Ornans, in the department of Doubs.

== History ==
The building was constructed by Nicolas Perrenot de Granvelle between May 1547 and 1550 for his son Antoine Perrenot de Granvelle. It incorporates the medieval house of PHILIBERT, that was built before 1484, and was the house of his grandmother ( this is located within the left-end of the building, 67 rue Pierre Vernier). Antoine Perrenot de Granvelle was Bishop of Arras, Archbishop of Malines, then cardinal, diplomate, and State Councillor for the Holy Roman Emperor Charles V then his son, Philippe II the King of Spain. He was counselor of Marguerite of Parma, Prime Minister of the Spanish Netherlands, Viceroy of Naples, And president of the supreme Council of Italy and of Castille. Antoine lived in the house after 1550, and especially between 1564 and 1586 (after his counter-reformation initiative in the Netherlands (1564) and before his death in Spain.

== Description ==
The house Granvelle was registered as a historical monument in 2015.

The building is the course of a 10-year restoration. A small museum on the family Granvelle, and the importance of Catholicism on the French culture, is to be incorporated in 67 Rue Pierre Vernier. The objective is to preserve French heritage; and, the education of future generations on the history of France.
