= The Oak at Flagey =

1864 painting by Gustave Courbet

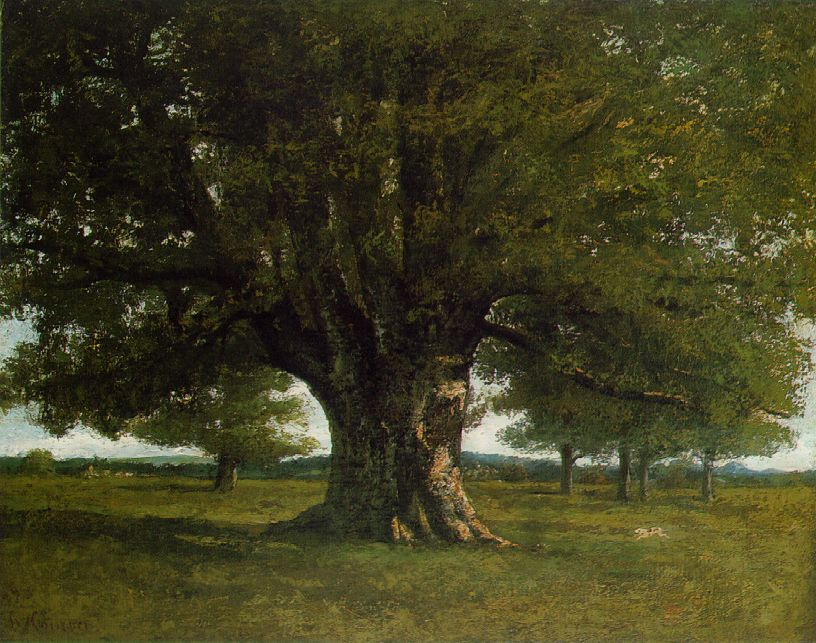
- Artist: Gustave Courbet
- Year: 1864
- Medium: oil on canvas
- Dimensions: 89 cm × 110 cm (35 in × 43 in)
- Location: Musée Courbet, Paris

The Oak at Flagey (French - Le Chêne de Flagey) or The Vercingetorix Oak (Le Chêne de Vercingétorix) is an oil-on-canvas landscape painting by the French Realist painter Gustave Courbet, created in 1864, measuring 89 by 110 cm. It shows an oak near the Courbet family farm in the village of Flagey, Doubs, a few kilometres from Ornans in Franche-Comté, named in relation to Vercingetorix. The oak was later struck by lightning and no longer survives. The painting is held at the Musée Courbet, in Ornans.

In 1880 the artist's sister Juliette Courbet sold it to the banker Henry C. Gibson and on the latter's death it was offered to the Pennsylvania Academy of the Fine Arts in 1896. It was sold at Sotheby's New York in 1987 to a Japanese collector, Michimasa Murauchi, for $450 000. It was then bought for 4.5 million Euros in 2012 by the Musée Courbet, including 2.7 million Euros from private donations and 1.3 million Euros from public funds. It was lent to the Volez, Voguez, Voyagez exhibition on Louis Vuitton at the Grand Palais.
