= Tarcenay-Foucherans =

- Commune
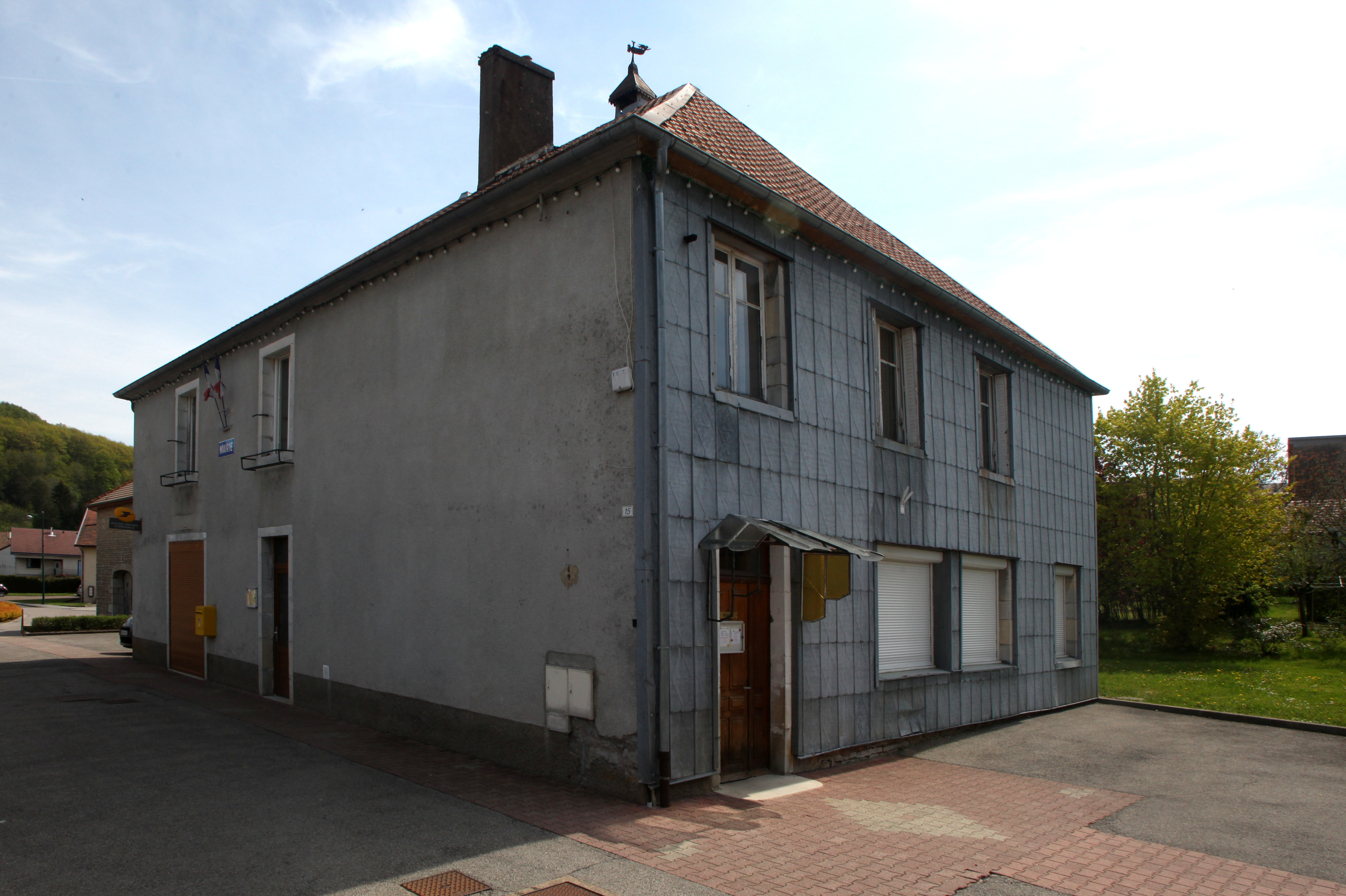
- The town hall in Tarcenay
- Location of Tarcenay-Foucherans
- Location within France Location within Bourgogne-Franche-Comté
- Coordinates: 47°09′25″N 6°06′47″E
- Country: France
- Region: Bourgogne-Franche-Comté
- Department: Doubs
- Arrondissement: Besançon
- Canton: Ornans
- Intercommunality: Loue-Lison

Government
  - Mayor (2020–2026): Maxime Groshenry
- Area^{1}: 24.04 km^{2} (9.28 sq mi)
- Highest elevation: 568 m (1,864 ft)
- Lowest elevation: 363 m (1,191 ft)
- Population (2023): 1,498
  - Density: 62.31/km^{2} (161.4/sq mi)
- Time zone: UTC+01:00 (CET)
  - Summer (DST): UTC+02:00 (CEST)
- INSEE/Postal code: 25558 /25620
- ^{1} French Land Register data, which excludes lakes, ponds, glaciers > 1 km^{2} (0.386 sq mi or 247 acres) and river estuaries.

Tarcenay-Foucherans (French pronunciation: [taʁsənɛ fuʃʁɑ̃]) is a commune in the Doubs department in the Bourgogne-Franche-Comté region in eastern France. It was established on 1 January 2019 by merger of the former communes of Tarcenay (the seat) and Foucherans.

== See also ==
- Communes of the Doubs department
