= Alexandre Daguet =

19th century Swiss historian

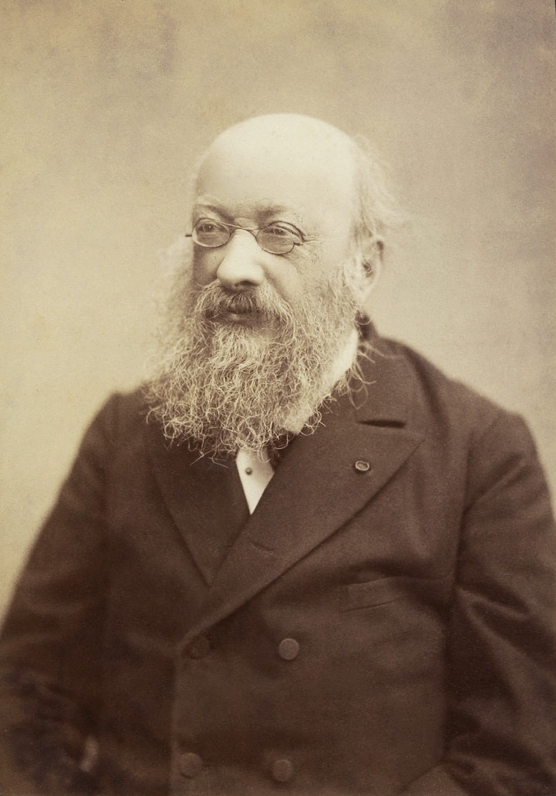
- Daguet (1880)
- Born: March 12, 1816; Fribourg, Switzerland
- Died: May 20, 1894 (aged 78); Neuchâtel, Switzerland
- Occupations: Historian; Politician; Teacher
- Years active: 1847–1894
- Known for: Councilman Grand Council of Geneva

Alexandre Daguet (March 12, 1816–May 20, 1894) was a Swiss historian, politician and educator. He was born in Fribourg, Switzerland. From 1849 to 1857 he was an elected member of the Great Council of Geneva.

== Early life ==
He was born in Fribourg, Switzerland on March 12, 1816. His parents were Nicolas and Françoise née Broillet. He studied at a Jesuit college in Fribourg. While in college he befriended poet Max Buchon. Buchon was a follower of the French utopian socialist Charles Fourier. Buchon did not convince Daguet to follow Charles Fourier.

== Career ==
He was the editor of the L'Educateur and he authored an education manual. He received an honorary doctorate from the University of Bern in Bern, Switzerland. After the 1847 Sonderbund War he was appointed to the rectorship of the Cantonal School of Graubünden. From 1849 to 1857 he was an elected member of the Great Council of Geneva. In 1866 he became the Chair of History at the Academy of Neuchâtel.

He died on May 20, 1894 in the Swiss town of Neuchâtel.

== Books ==
- Daguet, Alexandre (1880). Histoire de la Confédération Suisse (in French). Paris: H. Georg.
- Daguet, Alexandre (1872). Traditions et légendes de la Suisse romande (in French). Paris, France: L. Vincent.
