= Foucherans, Doubs =

Foucherans
- Part of Tarcenay-Foucherans
- Location of Foucherans
- Location within France Location within Bourgogne-Franche-Comté
- Coordinates: 47°09′29″N 6°08′14″E
- Country: France
- Region: Bourgogne-Franche-Comté
- Department: Doubs
- Arrondissement: Besançon
- Canton: Ornans
- Commune: Tarcenay-Foucherans
- Area^{1}: 10.95 km^{2} (4.23 sq mi)
- Highest elevation: 570 m (1,870 ft)
- Lowest elevation: 350 m (1,150 ft)
- Population (2016): 472
  - Density: 43.1/km^{2} (112/sq mi)
- Time zone: UTC+01:00 (CET)
  - Summer (DST): UTC+02:00 (CEST)
- Postal code: 25620
- ^{1} French Land Register data, which excludes lakes, ponds, glaciers > 1 km^{2} (0.386 sq mi or 247 acres) and river estuaries.

Foucherans (French pronunciation: [fuʃʁɑ̃]) is a former commune in the Doubs department in the Bourgogne-Franche-Comté region in eastern France. On 1 January 2019, it was merged into the new commune Tarcenay-Foucherans.

== See also ==
- Communes of the Doubs department
