= Max Buchon =

French writer (1818–1869)

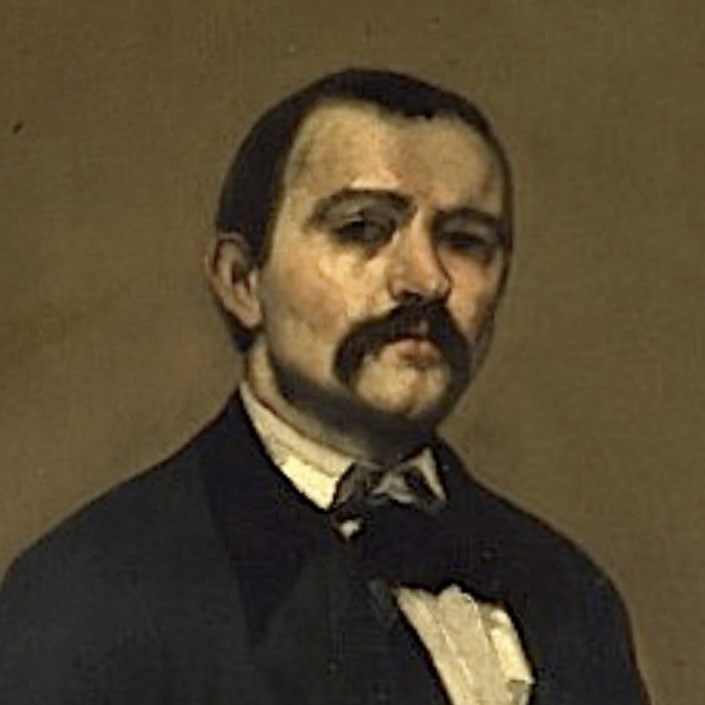
- Buchon in 1855 cropped from a painting by Gustave Courbet
- Born: Joseph Maximilien Buchon; May 8, 1818; Salins-les-Bains France
- Died: December 14, 1869 (aged 51); Salins-les-Bains FR
- Occupations: Poet; Writer; Translator
- Years active: 1834–1869

Joseph Maximilien Buchon also known as Max Buchon (May 8, 1818–December 14, 1869) was a French poet, novelist and translator. He was from Salins-les-Bains and for a time he lived in Switzerland. He founded the newspaper, La Démocratie Salinoise.

== Early life ==
In 1818, we was born in Salins-les-Bains France. His parents were Jean-Baptiste Buchon and Jeanne Marie née Pasteur. His father was a soldier in Napoleon's army. In the 1830s he became friends with artist Gustave Courbet and the two were close for the rest of Buchon's life. From 1834 to 1837 he studied at the College of Saint Michael in Fribourg Switzerland.

== Career ==
While in college he befriended politician Alexandre Daguet. Buchon was a follower of the French utopian socialist Charles Fourier but he could not convince Daguet that Fournier's ideas had validity. Buchon devoted himself to literature. He became radicalized by the French Revolution of 1848. Eight days after the revolution he founded the newspaper, La Démocratie Salinoise. On May 2, 1848 Buchon became the Deputy Mayor of salins.

In 1851 after the Napoleon III French coup d'état of 1851 he fled to Switzerland. In Jura Switzerland he wrote articles for the newspaper Rouge and for other liberal newspapers in Salins, Switzerland. In 1856 he returned to settle in his home town of Salins. He was able to return home because his friend Gustave Courbet asked that Buchon be pardoned. He introduced the works of Swiss Novelist Jeremias Gotthelf to France by translating his writings.

== Legacy ==
When he died in Salins on December 14, 1869, Gustave Courbet was at his bedside. After his death in 1869 French poet Victor Hugo wrote: "He leaves as a poet a work and as a citizen an example." He was interred in Salins cemetery and on his tomb there is a bust of Buchon which was created by Max Claudet.

== Books ==
- Buchon, Joseph Maximilien (1877). Romans: Le Matachin (in French). Paris, France: Sandoz et Fischbacher.
- Buchon, Max (1869). Le Matachin, scènes de la vie Franc-Comtoise (in French).
- Buchon, Max (1863). Noëls et chants populaires de la Franche-Comté. Salins: Billet et Duvernois.
- Chants Populaires de La Franche-Comta
- Buchon, Max. Nouvelles Bernoises.
- Buchon, Max (1877). Le Matachin (in French). Paris, France: Sandoz et Fischbacher.
- Buchon, Max (1858). Scènes franc-comtoises (in French). Waterloo, Belgium: Meline, Cans & Cie.
