= Bonnevaux-le-Prieuré =

- Part of Ornans
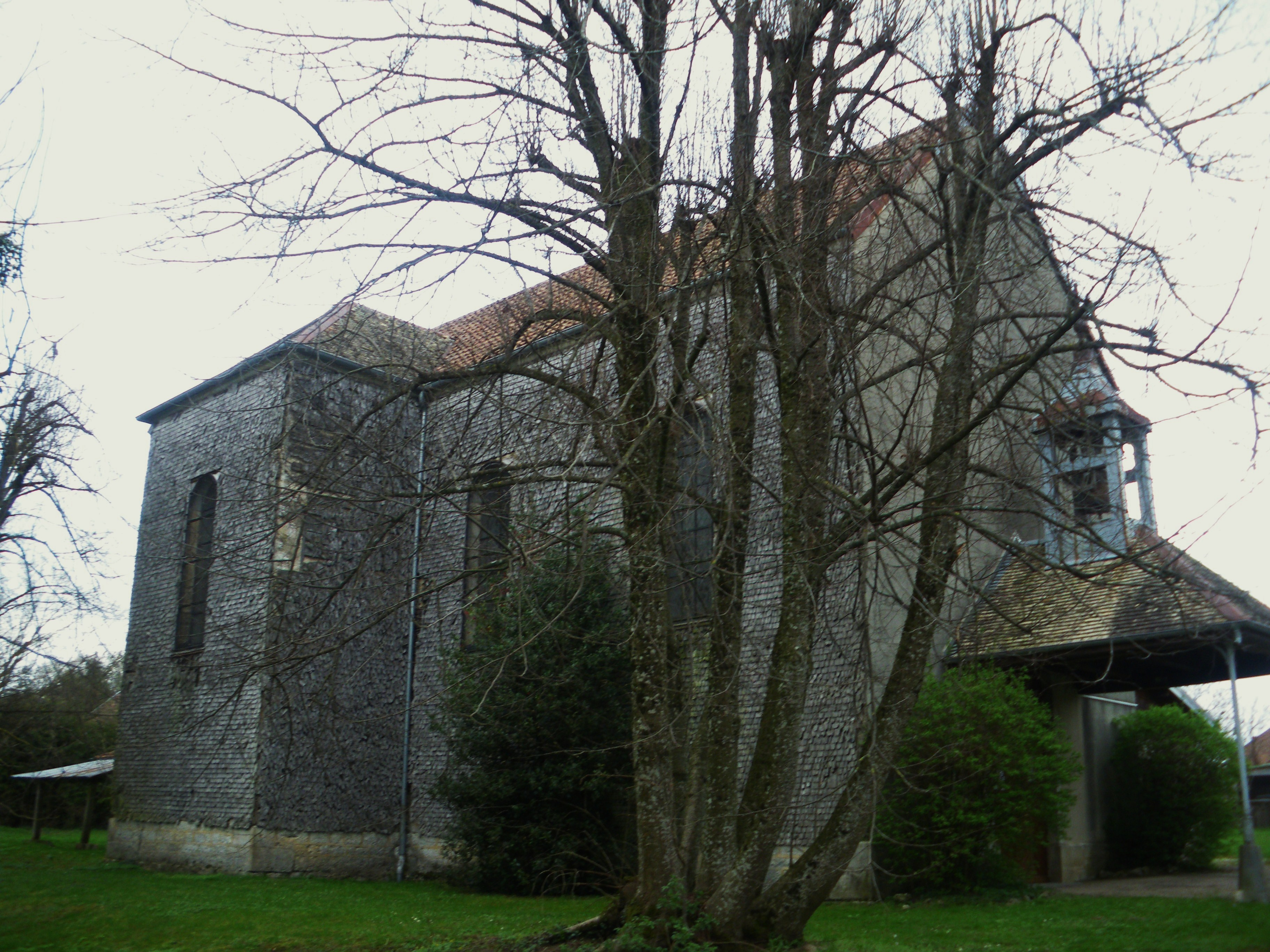
- Location of Bonnevaux-le-Prieuré
- Location within France Location within Bourgogne-Franche-Comté
- Coordinates: 47°08′03″N 6°10′12″E
- Country: France
- Region: Bourgogne-Franche-Comté
- Department: Doubs
- Arrondissement: Besançon
- Canton: Ornans
- Commune: Ornans
- Area^{1}: 3.08 km^{2} (1.19 sq mi)
- Highest elevation: 548 m (1,798 ft)
- Lowest elevation: 356 m (1,168 ft)
- Population (2023): 127
  - Density: 41.2/km^{2} (107/sq mi)
- Time zone: UTC+01:00 (CET)
  - Summer (DST): UTC+02:00 (CEST)
- Postal code: 25620
- ^{1} French Land Register data, which excludes lakes, ponds, glaciers > 1 km^{2} (0.386 sq mi or 247 acres) and river estuaries.

Bonnevaux-le-Prieuré (French pronunciation: [bɔnvo lə pʁijœʁe]) is a former commune in the Doubs department in the Bourgogne-Franche-Comté region in eastern France. On 1 January 2016, it was merged into the commune Ornans.

== See also ==
- Communes of the Doubs department
