= Max Claudet =

French writer

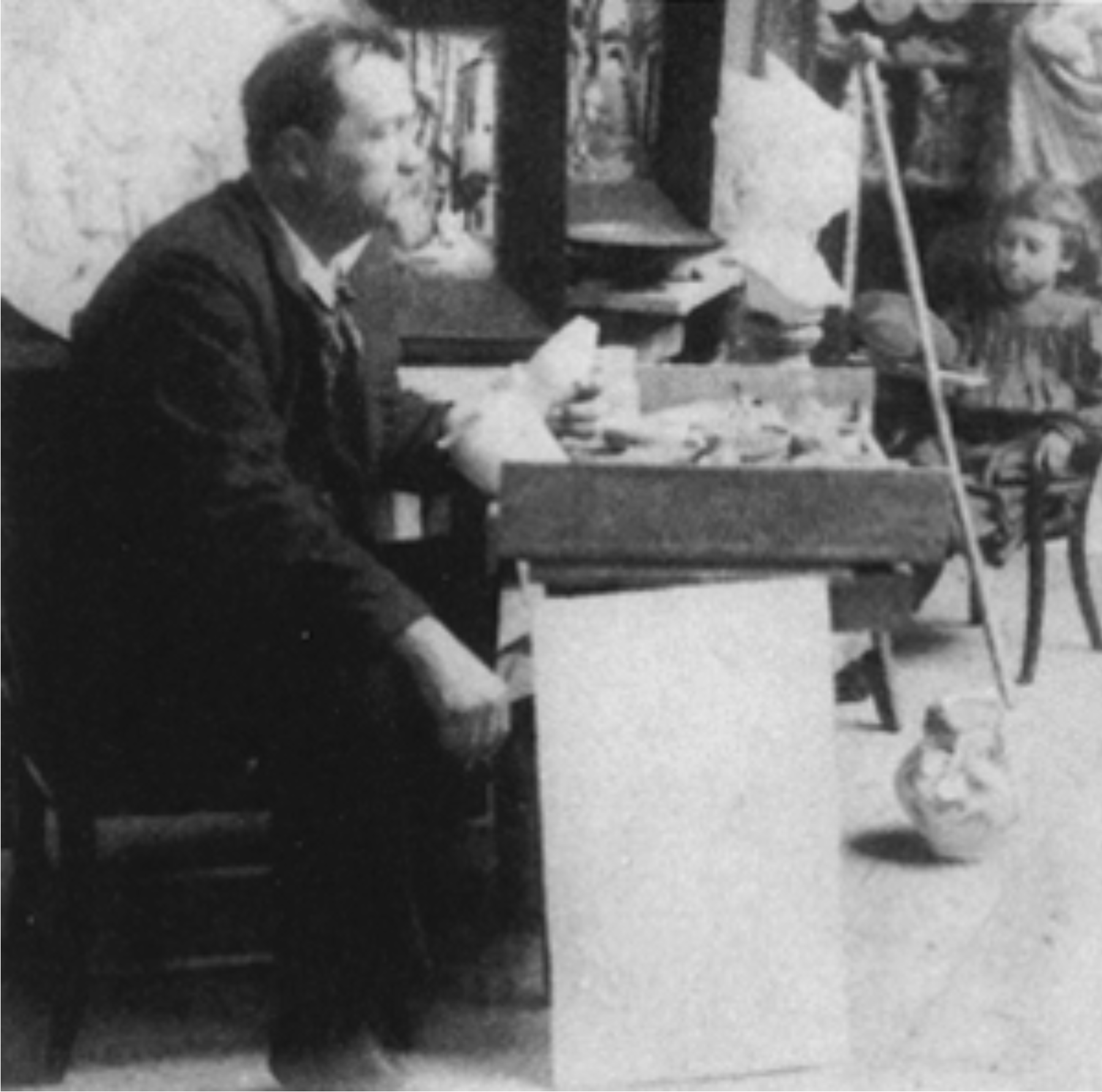
- Max Claudet in his workshop (1880)
- Born: Georges Max Claudet; August 18, 1840; Fécamp France
- Died: May 28, 1893 (aged 52); Fécamp, Seine-Maritime France
- Occupations: Sculptor; Ceramist; Painter
- Known for: Realism (arts)

Max Claudet (August 18, 1840–May 28, 1893) was a sculptor, painter and Ceramist from France. He created works in the style of realism and he regularly displayed his works at the Salon (Paris). He became friends with Gustave Courbet and he wrote a book titled, Souvenirs, Gustave Courbet.

== Early life ==
He was born Georges Max Claudet in Fécamp France on August 18, 1840. His father was Félix-Narcisse Claudet; a customs inspector. On November 10, 1839, Félix-Narcisse Claudet married Miss Marie-Alexandrine née Vuillemenot. In 1842, two years after Max was born, his mother Marie Claudet died. When he was fifteen he was apprenticed to the sculptor Victor Huguenin in Paris. In 1858 and 1859, he was educated at the School of Fine Arts in Dijon and it was there that he worked with the sculptor Darbois. In 1860 he worked with Darbois. His grandfather, Antide Claudet, was the mayor of Salins-les-Bains in 1793.

== Career ==
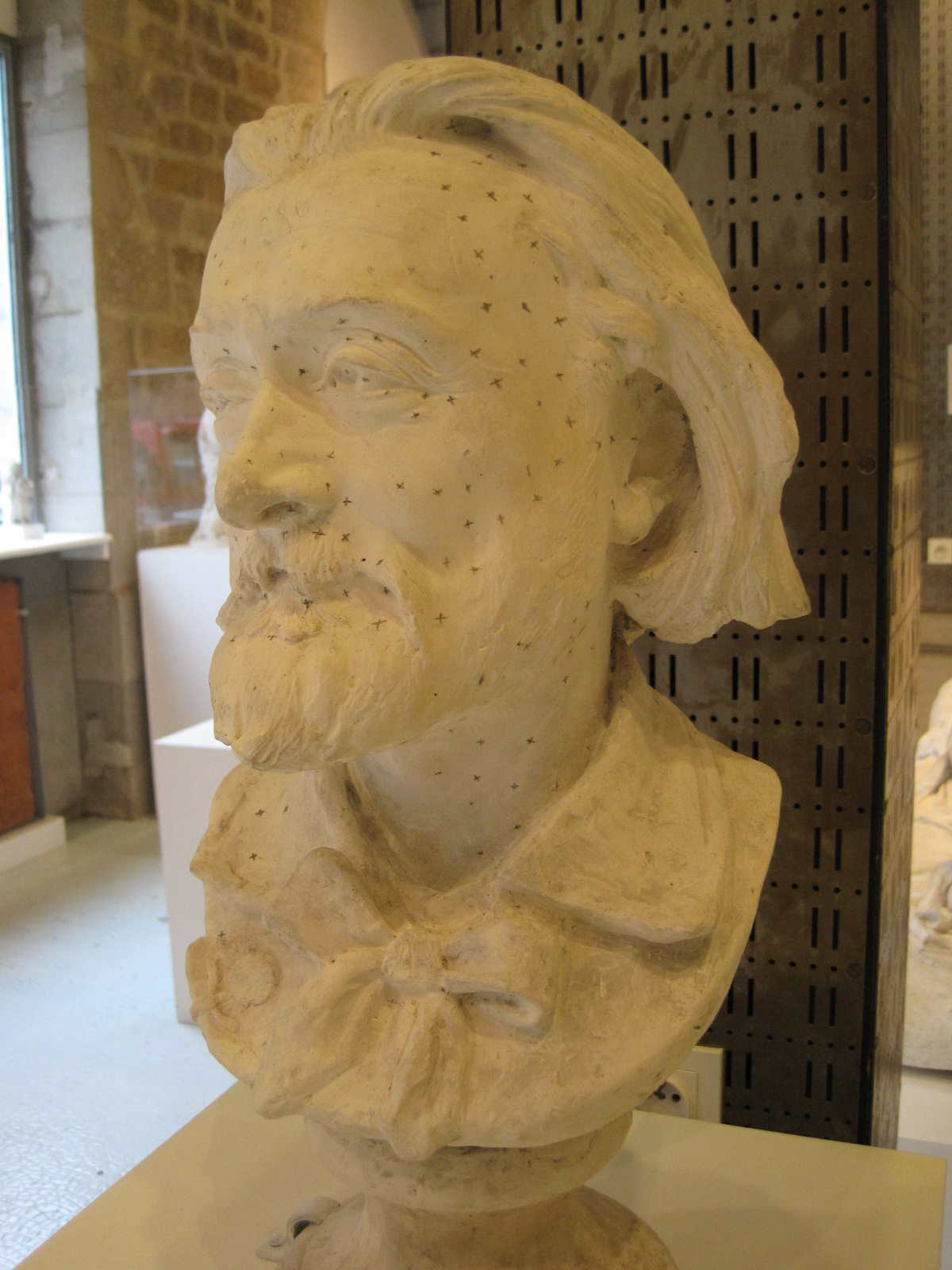
(1883) Plaster bust of Achille Billot by Max Claudet Museum of Fine Arts of Lons-le-Saunier

In 1860 he submitted two works to the Great Exhibition of Besançon and in 1861 he was awarded a first class medal. In 1862 he won an award for his bust of Napoleon III. He became friends with Max Buchon and Buchon wrote articles about Claudet in his publication; La Sentinelle du Jura. Max Buchon was a proponent of realism and he influenced Claudet to create realistic sculptures.

Claudet's studio was in Salans, Jura France and the painter Gustave Courbet worked there. He was introduced to the sculptor Jean-Joseph Perraud by Max Buchon. Claudet was one of Courbet's first biographers. Claudet learned painting techniques from Courbet. The two were close friends and after Courbet died Claudet released a book titled, Souvenirs, Gustave Courbet. He displayed his work at the Paris Salons. He continued his work until his death inn 1893.

== Legacy ==
There is a Max Claudet Museum in Salins-les-Bains southeast of Dole, Jura in France. The museum is located in the town where Claudet was born and raised. The museum features ceramics and sculptures by Claudet. His work also featured at the Musée des Beaux-Arts de Dijon.

== See also ==
- List of single-artist museums
