= Byans-sur-Doubs =

- Commune
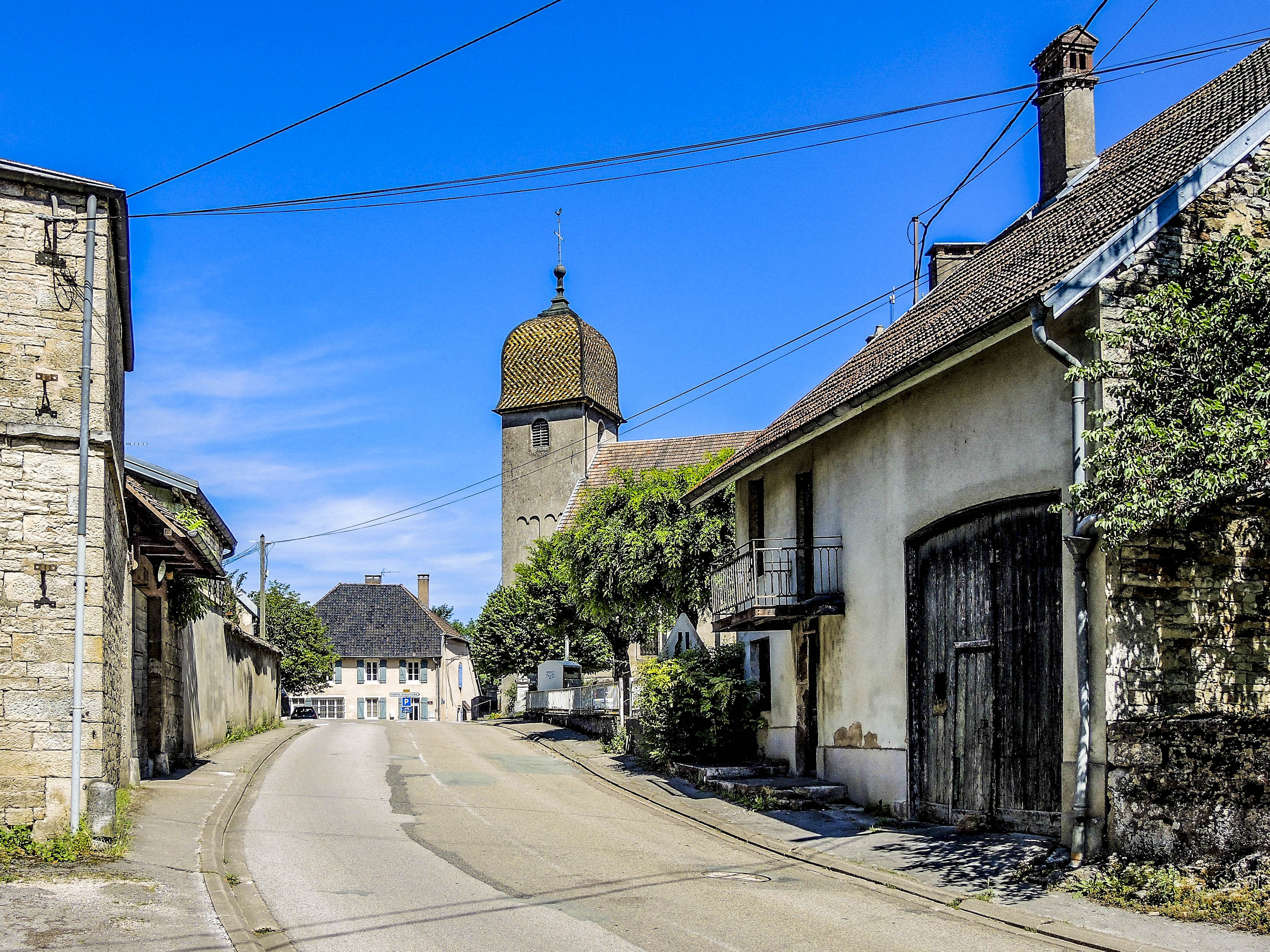
- The main street and the church

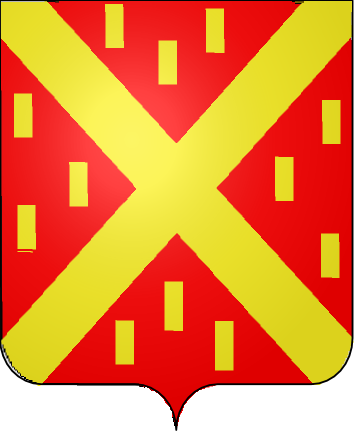
- Coat of arms
- Location of Byans-sur-Doubs
- Location within France Location within Bourgogne-Franche-Comté
- Coordinates: 47°06′58″N 5°51′22″E
- Country: France
- Region: Bourgogne-Franche-Comté
- Department: Doubs
- Arrondissement: Besançon
- Canton: Saint-Vit
- Intercommunality: Grand Besançon Métropole

Government
  - Mayor (2020–2026): Didier Paineau
- Area^{1}: 9.91 km^{2} (3.83 sq mi)
- Highest elevation: 522 m (1,713 ft)
- Lowest elevation: 223 m (732 ft)
- Population (2023): 613
  - Density: 61.9/km^{2} (160/sq mi)
- Time zone: UTC+01:00 (CET)
  - Summer (DST): UTC+02:00 (CEST)
- INSEE/Postal code: 25105 /25320
- ^{1} French Land Register data, which excludes lakes, ponds, glaciers > 1 km^{2} (0.386 sq mi or 247 acres) and river estuaries.

Byans-sur-Doubs (French pronunciation: [bjɑ̃ syʁ du], literally Byans on Doubs) is a commune in the Doubs department in the Bourgogne-Franche-Comté region in eastern France.

== Population ==
Historical population
Year	Pop.	±% p.a.
1968	451	—
1975	447	−0.13%
1982	433	−0.45%
1990	549	+3.01%
1999	560	+0.22%
2007	578	+0.40%
2012	533	−1.61%
2017	560	+0.99%
2023	613	+1.52%
Source: INSEE

== See also ==
- Communes of the Doubs department
