= Ornans =

- Commune
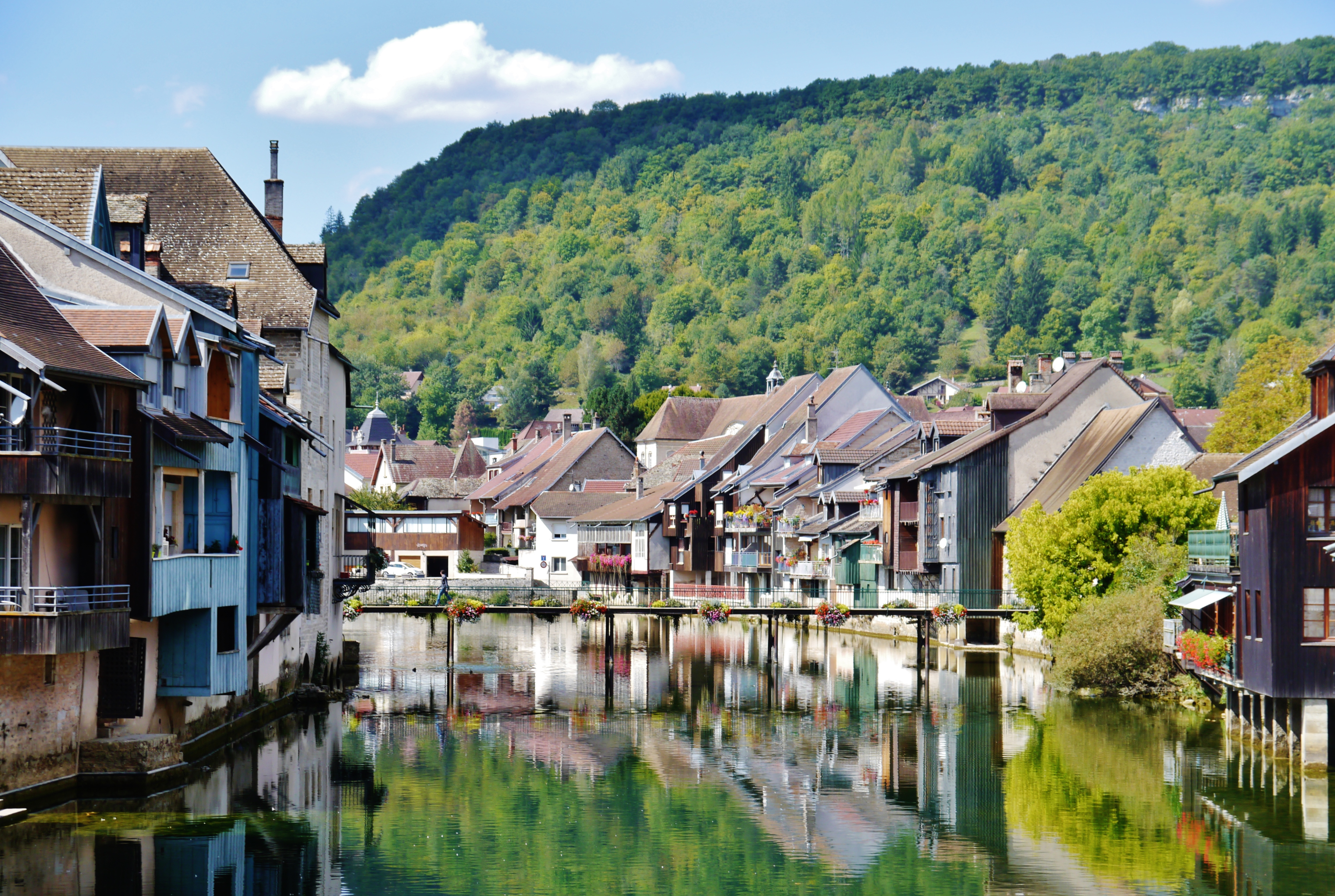
- Facades of buildings along the Loue river.

- Flag Coat of arms
- Location of Ornans
- Location within France Location within Bourgogne-Franche-Comté
- Coordinates: 47°06′22″N 6°08′38″E
- Country: France
- Region: Bourgogne-Franche-Comté
- Department: Doubs
- Arrondissement: Besançon
- Canton: Ornans
- Intercommunality: Loue-Lison

Government
  - Mayor (2020–2026): Isabelle Guillame
- Area^{1}: 35.72 km^{2} (13.79 sq mi)
- Highest elevation: 635 m (2,083 ft)
- Lowest elevation: 323 m (1,060 ft)
- Population (2023): 4,419
  - Density: 123.7/km^{2} (320.4/sq mi)
- Time zone: UTC+01:00 (CET)
  - Summer (DST): UTC+02:00 (CEST)
- INSEE/Postal code: 25434 /25290
- ^{1} French Land Register data, which excludes lakes, ponds, glaciers > 1 km^{2} (0.386 sq mi or 247 acres) and river estuaries.

Ornans (French pronunciation: [ɔʁnɑ̃]) is a commune in the Doubs department in the Bourgogne-Franche-Comté region in eastern France. On 1 January 2016 the former commune Bonnevaux-le-Prieuré was merged into Ornans.

== Personalities ==
Ornans is the birthplace of the French realist painter, Gustave Courbet (1819 - 1877). One of Courbet's most famous paintings is Burial at Ornans, which depicts actual people from the area attending a funeral.

The historical building, l'Hôtel de Granvelle, now designated 67 and 77 Rue Pierre Vernier, was the birthplace of Cardinal Antoine Perrenot de Granvelle (20 August 1517 - 21 September 1586) who was the main minister responsible for Imperial foreign policy over several decades under Charles V, Holy Roman Emperor (called "Charles Quint" in French), Holy Roman Emperor from 1516 to 1556. His father Nicholas Perrenot de Granvelle (1484–1550), also born in Ornans, had been Chancellor of the Empire before him and trusted advisor to Charles V from the time he was elected emperor at 19 years of age. Nicholas (father of 15 children) purchased a building located in the center of the town, and made significant expansions; this became known as L'Hôtel de Granvelle. He groomed his son to assume his advisory position to the Emperor, and to the Pope. In his unique role, and powerful position, it is believed that Antoine was one of the architects of the Counter-Reformation. (i.e. He was charged with addressing the Council of Trent in the name of the emperor (9 January 1543)). "His vast correspondence is an inexhaustible source of information concerning the history of the sixteenth century. It might also be said, writes the celebrated archivist, Gachard, that no minister ever wrote as much as the Cardinal de Granvelle. His correspondence has been edited partly in France by Weiss, "Les papiers d'état de Granvelle" (9 vols., 4to, 1841–52), partly in Belgium, "La correspondence du cardinal Granvelle" (12 vols., 4to, 1878–96), the first three volumes by E. Poullet, the remainder by Ch. Piat."

The mathematician and instrument maker Pierre Vernier, for whom the eponymous scale is named, was also a native of this small town (19 August 1580 -14 September 1637). The main avenue of Ornans bears his name, Rue Pierre Vernier.

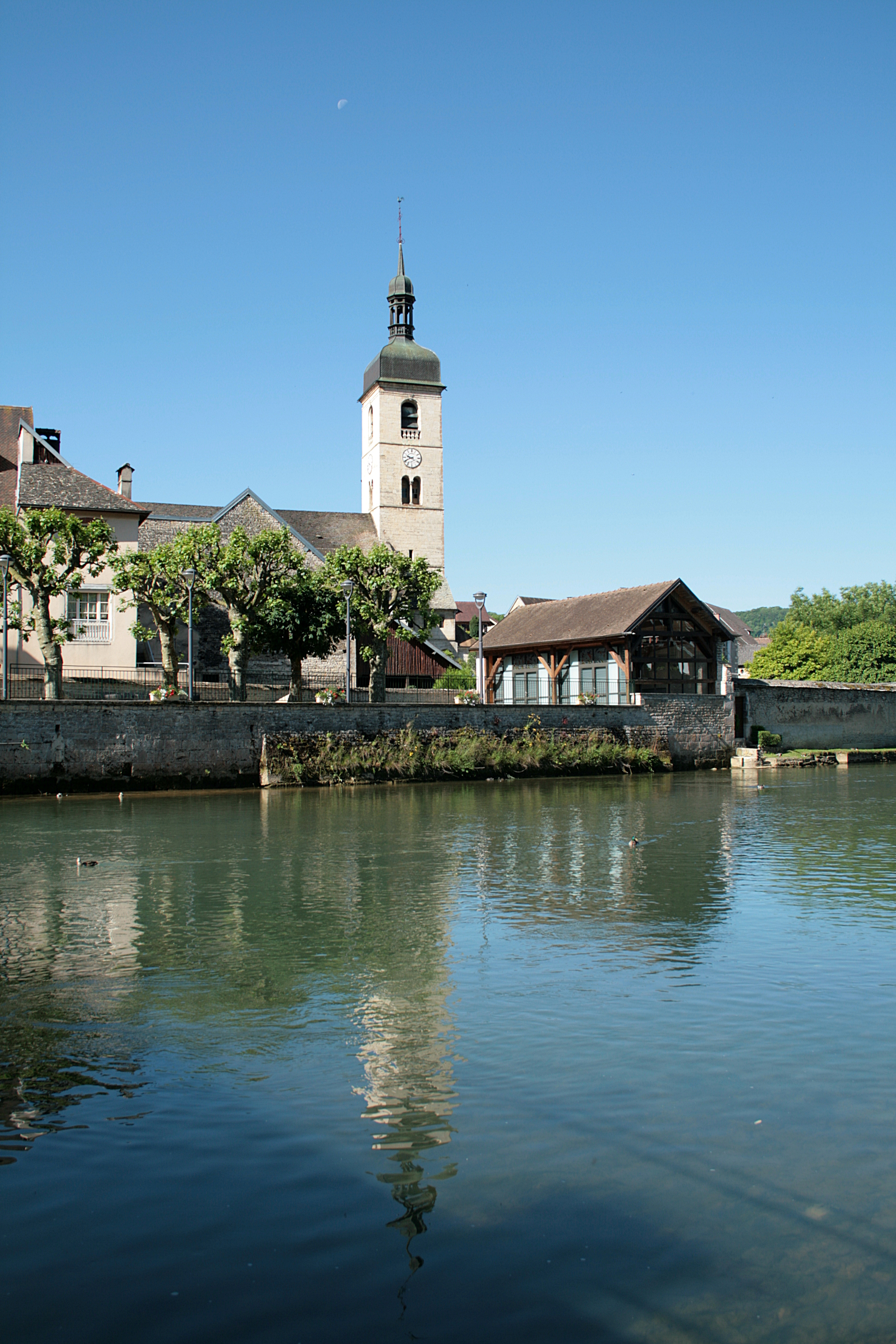
The Loue and the neighborhood of Saint-Laurent

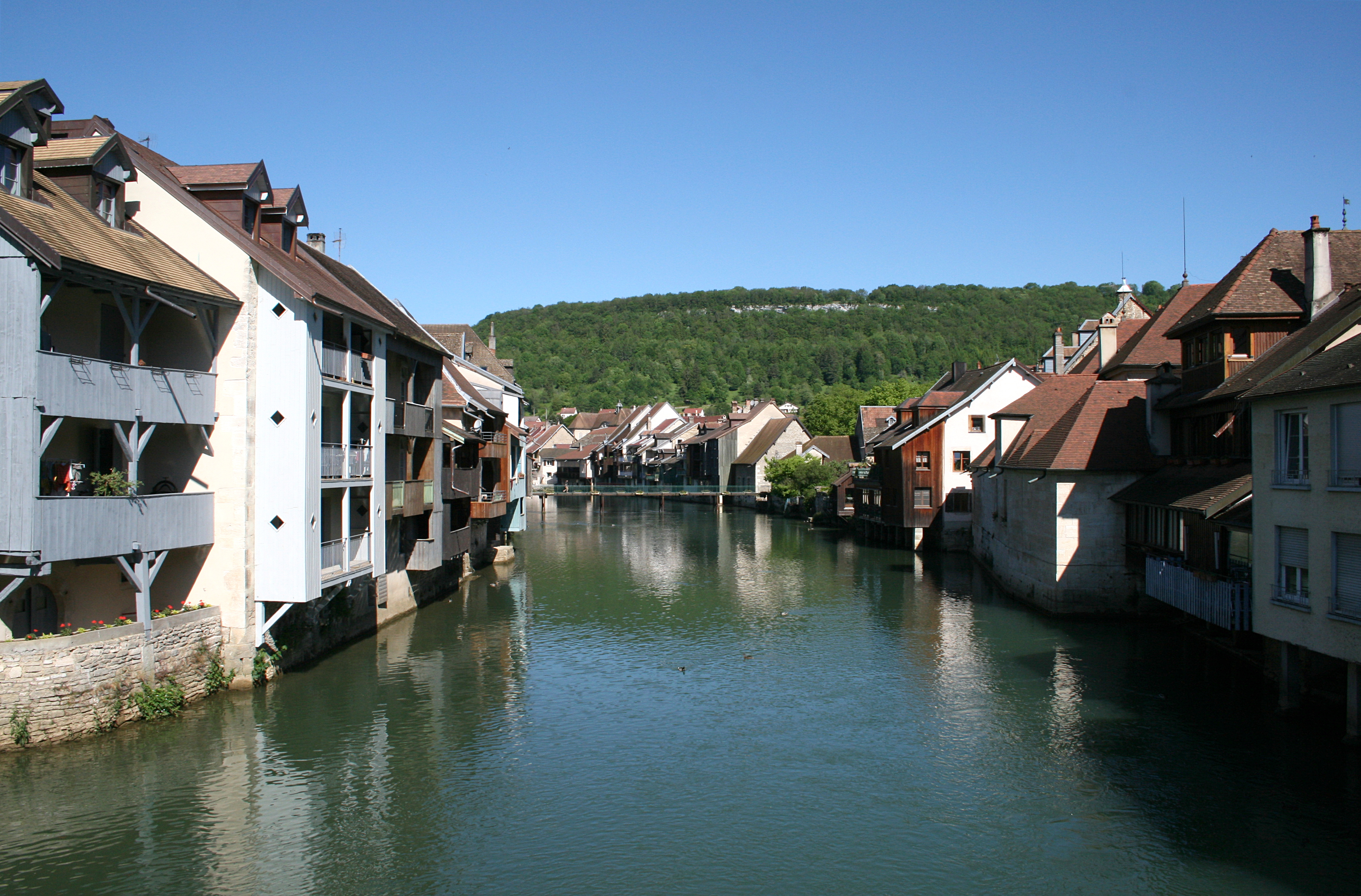
House along the River Loue

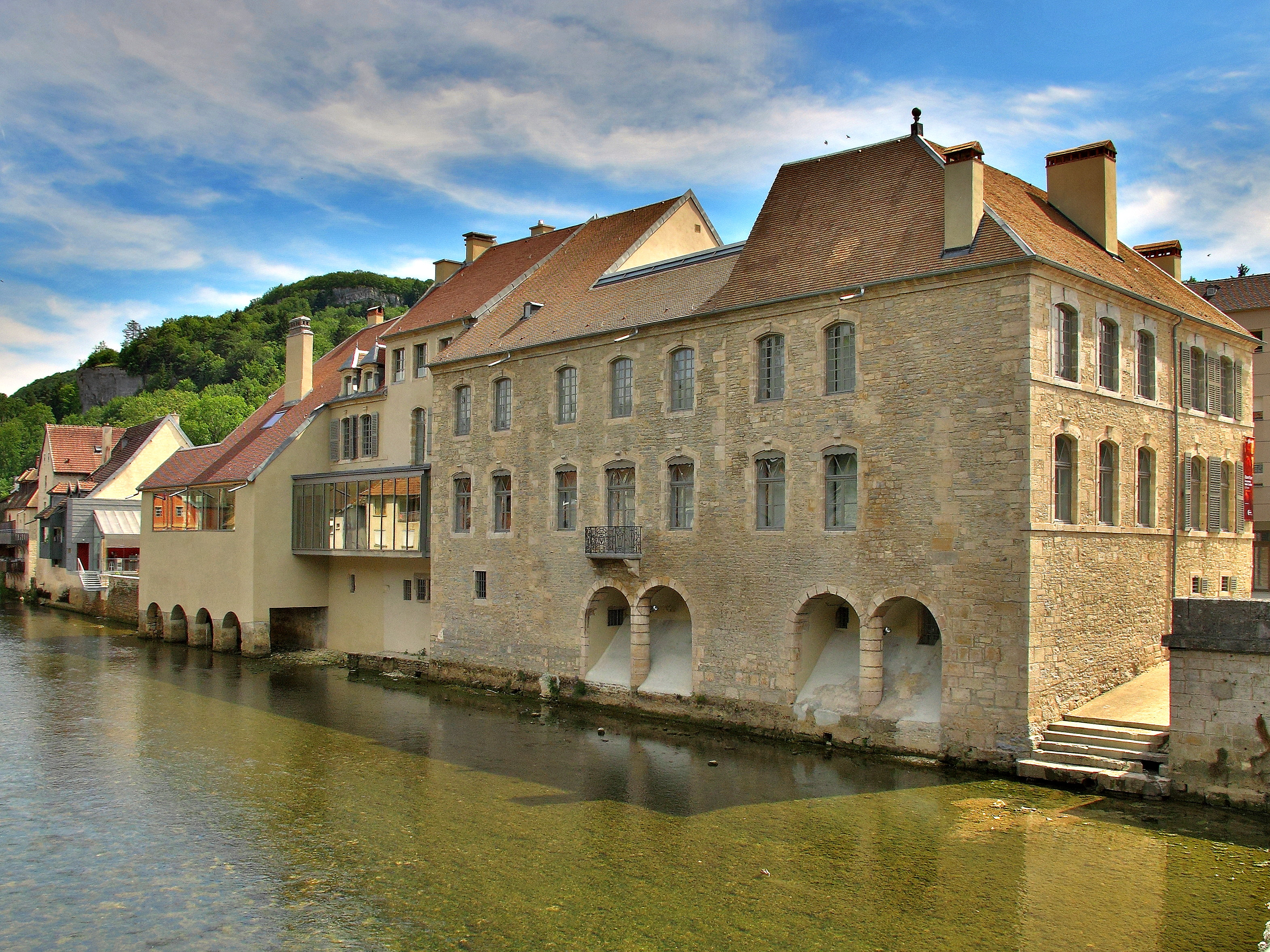
The Courbet Museum

== Population ==
The population data in the table and graph below refer to the commune of Ornans proper, in its geography at the given years. The commune of Ornans absorbed the former commune of Bonnevaux-le-Prieuré in 2016.

Historical population

Year	Pop.	±% p.a.
1793	3,104	—
1800	3,266	+0.73%
1806	3,243	−0.12%
1821	3,019	−0.48%
1831	2,982	−0.12%
1836	3,096	+0.75%
1841	3,306	+1.32%
1846	3,304	−0.01%
1851	3,483	+1.06%
1856	3,189	−1.75%
1861	3,522	+2.01%
1866	3,448	−0.42%
1872	3,173	−1.38%
1876	3,169	−0.03%
1881	3,350	+1.12%
1886	3,279	−0.43%
1891	3,092	−1.17%
1896	3,204	+0.71%
1901	3,153	−0.32%

Year	Pop.	±% p.a.
1906	2,910	−1.59%
1911	2,736	−1.23%
1921	2,628	−0.40%
1926	2,908	+2.05%
1931	3,051	+0.96%
1936	2,969	−0.54%
1946	2,840	−0.44%
1954	3,237	+1.65%
1962	3,619	+1.40%
1968	4,147	+2.30%
1975	4,231	+0.29%
1982	4,134	−0.33%
1990	4,016	−0.36%
1999	4,037	+0.06%
2007	4,106	+0.21%
2012	4,259	+0.73%
2017	4,413	+0.71%
2023	4,419	+0.02%

Source: EHESS and INSEE (1968-2023)

External videos
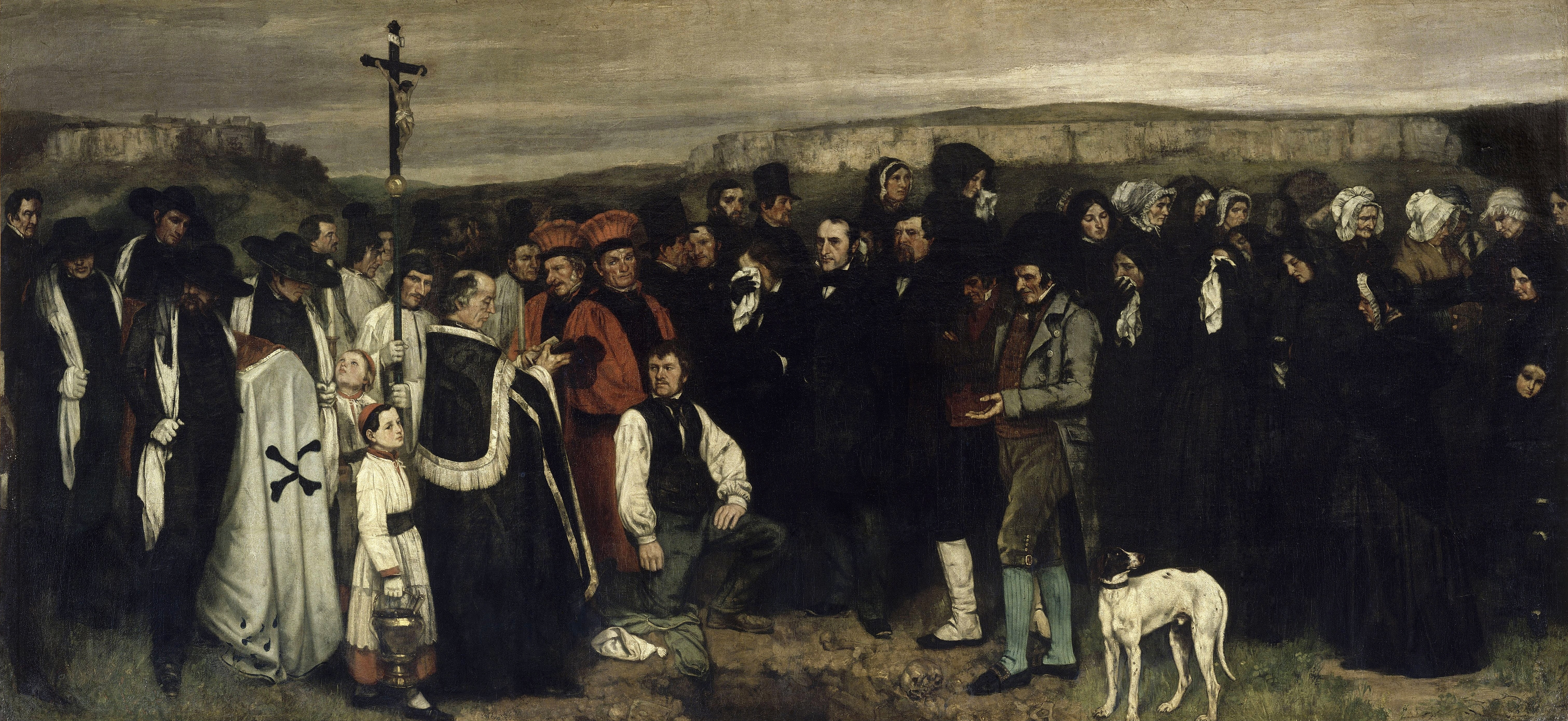
- Smarthistory - Courbet's Burial at Ornans

== See also ==
- Communes of the Doubs department
