= 1917 Swiss federal election =

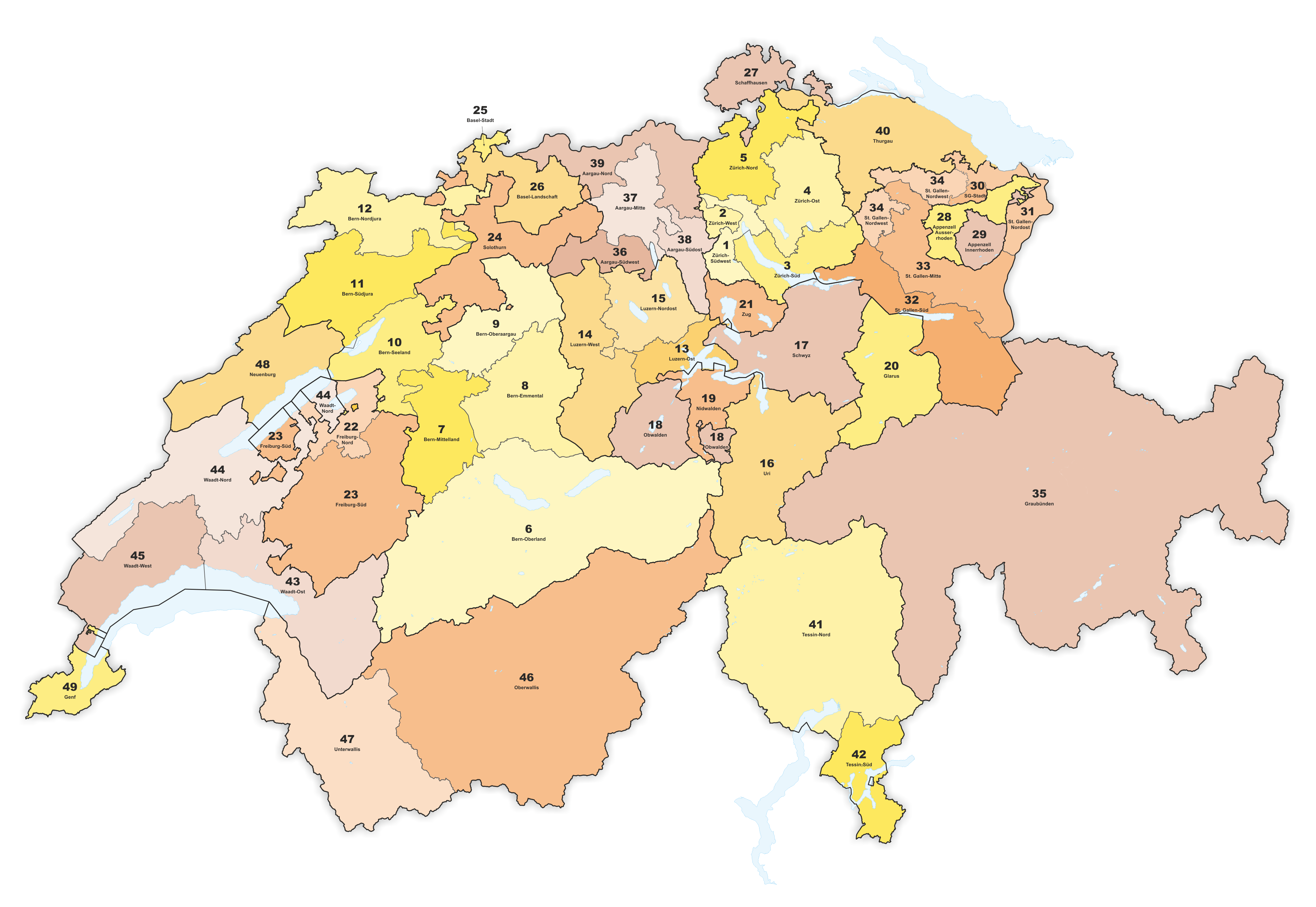
The 49 electoral districts

Federal elections were held in Switzerland on 28 October 1917. The Free Democratic Party retained its majority in the National Council. They were the last elections held under the majoritarian system; following a referendum in 1918 in which two-thirds of voters voted for the introduction of proportional representation, the electoral system was changed and early elections held in 1919.

== Electoral system ==
The 189 members of the National Council were elected in 49 single- and multi-member constituencies using a three-round system. Candidates had to receive a majority in the first or second round to be elected; if it went to a third round, only a plurality was required. Voters could cast as many votes as there were seats in their constituency. There was one seat for every 20,000 citizens, with seats allocated to cantons in proportion to their population.

== Results ==
Voter turnout was highest in Schaffhausen (where voting was compulsory) at 86.8% and lowest in Uri at 23.4%.

Party	Votes	%	Seats	+/–
Free Democratic Party	210,323	40.84	103	–9
Social Democratic Party	158,450	30.77	20	+2
Conservative People's Party	84,784	16.46	42	+5
Liberal Democratic Party	25,188	4.89	12	–4
Democratic Group	16,818	3.27	7	+3
Party of Farmers, Traders and Independents	19,459	3.78	4	+3
Others	19,459	3.78	1	+1
Total	515,022	100.00	189	0
Valid votes	515,022	94.04		
Invalid/blank votes	32,630	5.96		
Total votes	547,652	100.00		
Registered voters/turnout	915,552	59.82		
Source: Mackie & Rose, BFS (seats)

=== By constituency ===
Constituency	Seats	Party	Seats won	Elected members
Zürich 1	7	Free Democratic Party	7	Emil Zürcher; Alfred Frey; Albert Meyer; Jakob Lutz; Friedrich Fritschi; Robert Schmid; John Syz
Zürich 2	5	Social Democratic Party	5	Herman Greulich; August Huggler; Anton Rimathé; Robert Grimm; Fritz Platten
Zürich 3	5	Free Democratic Party	4	Heinrich Hess; Theodor Odinga; Karl August Koller; Emil Rellstab
Zürich 3	5	Liberal Party	1	Johann Rudolf Amsler
Zürich 4	5	Free Democratic Party	4	Hans Sträuli; Carl Jakob Sulzer; Carl Bertschinger; Emil Hardmeier
Zürich 4	5	Social Democratic Party	1	Friedrich Studer
Zürich 5	3	Democratic Group	2	David Ringger; Johann Konrad Hörni
Zürich 5	3	Party of Farmers, Traders and Independents	1	Friedrich Bopp
Bern 6	6	Free Democratic Party	6	Robert Stucki; Emil Lohner; Arnold Gottlieb Bühler; Hermann Schüpbach; Johann Jakob Rebmann; Johann Friedrich Michel
Bern 7	7	Social Democratic Party	3	Gustav Müller; Emil Düby; Oskar Schneeberger
Bern 7	7	Free Democratic Party	3	Felix Koch; Johann Jenny; Johann Hirter
Bern 7	7	Liberal Party	1	Fritz Burren
Bern 8	4	Free Democratic Party	4	Johann Jakob Schär; Fritz Bühlmann; Friedrich Minder; Carl Moser
Bern 9	4	Free Democratic Party	2	Friedrich Buri; Michael Hofer
Bern 9	4	Social Democratic Party	2	August Rikli; Hermann Brand
Bern 10	5	Free Democratic Party	4	Alfred Moll; Karl Scheurer; Jakob Freiburghaus; Eduard Will
Bern 10	5	Social Democratic Party	1	Arnold Knellwolf
Bern 11	3	Social Democratic Party	2	Émile Ryser; Achille Grospierre
Bern 11	3	Conservative People's Party	1	Xavier Jobin
Bern 12	3	Conservative People's Party	2	Joseph Choquard; Ernest Daucourt
Bern 12	3	Social Democratic Party	1	Maurice Goetschel
Lucerne 13	3	Free Democratic Party	3	Gustav Schaller; Peter Knüsel; Ferdinand Steiner
Lucerne 14	2	Conservative People's Party	3	Eduard Häfliger; Josef Anton Balmer
Lucerne 15	3	Conservative People's Party	3	Heinrich Walther; Dominik Fellmann; Franz Moser-Schär
Uri 16	1	Free Democratic Party	1	Martin Gamma
Schwyz 17	3	Conservative People's Party	2	Anton von Hettlingen; Josef Anton Ferdinand Büeler
Schwyz 17	3	Free Democratic Party	1	Martin Steinegger
Obwalden 18	1	Conservative People's Party	1	Peter Anton Ming
Nidwalden 19	1	Conservative People's Party	1	Hans von Matt Jr.
Glarus 20	2	Democratic Group	1	Eduard Blumer
Glarus 20	2	Free Democratic Party	1	Heinrich Jenny
Zug 21	1	Free Democratic Party	1	Hermann Stadlin
Fribourg 22	2	Conservative People's Party	1	Eugène Descheneaux
Fribourg 22	2	Free Democratic Party	1	Hermann Liechti
Fribourg 23	5	Conservative People's Party	4	Jean-Marie Musy; Franz Boschung; Charles de Wuilleret; Eugène Grand
Fribourg 23	5	Free Democratic Party	1	A.-F.-L. Cailler
Solothurn 24	6	Conservative People's Party	2	Siegfried Hartmann; August Kurer
Solothurn 24	6	Free Democratic Party	2	Hermann Obrecht; Friedrich Stuber
Solothurn 24	6	Social Democratic Party	2	Hans Affolter; Jacques Schmid
Basel-Stadt 25	7	Free Democratic Party	2	Christian Rothenberger; Emil Göttisheim
Basel-Stadt 25	7	Liberal Party	1	Paul Speiser
Basel-Stadt 25	7	Party of Farmers, Traders and Independents	1	Rudolf Gelpke
Basel-Stadt 25	7	Democratic Group	1	Karl-Oskar Schär
Basel-Stadt 25	7	Social Democratic Party	1	Johannes Frei
Basel-Stadt 25	7	Conservative People's Party	1	Ernst Feigenwinter
Basel-Landschaft 26	4	Free Democratic Party	3	Gustav Adolf Seiler; Hermann Straumann; Albert Grieder
Basel-Landschaft 26	4	Independent	1	Heinrich Strub
Schaffhausen 27	2	Free Democratic Party	2	Carl Spahn; Robert Grieshaber
Appenzell Ausserrhoden 28	3	Free Democratic Party	2	Arthur Eugster; Johannes Eisenhut
Appenzell Ausserrhoden 28	3	Social Democratic Party	1	Howard Eugster
Appenzell Innerhoden 29	1	Conservative People's Party	1	Adolf Steuble
St. Gallen 30	4	Free Democratic Party	3	Karl Emil Wild; Eduard Scherrer; Albert Mächler
St. Gallen 30	4	Democratic Group	1	J. A. Scherrer-Füllemann
St. Gallen 31	4	Conservative People's Party	2	Carl Zurburg; Johann Baptist Eisenring
St. Gallen 31	4	Democratic Group	1	Heinrich Otto Weber
St. Gallen 31	4	Free Democratic Party	1	Ernst Schmidheiny
St. Gallen 32	3	Free Democratic Party	3	Gallus Schwendener; Ernst Wagner; Robert Forrer
St. Gallen 33	2	Conservative People's Party	2	Emil Grünenfelder; Johann Baptist Schubiger
St. Gallen 34	2	Conservative People's Party	2	Othmar Staub; Thomas Holenstein Sr.
Grisons 35	6	Free Democratic Party	4	Eduard Walser; Johann Anton Caflisch; Paul Raschein Sr.; Andrea Vital
Grisons 35	6	Conservative People's Party	2	Alois Steinhauser; Johann Schmid
Aargau 36	3	Free Democratic Party	3	Otto Hunziker; Johann Rudolf Suter; Alwin Weber
Aargau 37	4	Free Democratic Party	4	Hans Siegrist; Heinrich Eugen Abt; Emil Keller; Arthur Widmer
Aargau 38	1	Conservative People's Party	1	Jakob Nietlispach
Aargau 39	4	Conservative People's Party	2	Alfred Wyrsch; Franz Xaver Eggspühler
Aargau 39	4	Free Democratic Party	2	Gustav Adolf Ursprung; Joseph Jäger
Thurgau 40	7	Free Democratic Party	4	Oskar Ullmann; Heinrich Häberlin; Jakob Zingg; Jakob Müller
Thurgau 40	7	Democratic Group	1	Emil Hofmann
Thurgau 40	7	Conservative People's Party	1	Alfons von Streng
Thurgau 40	7	Party of Farmers, Traders and Independents	1	Carl Eigenmann
Ticino 41	4	Free Democratic Party	3	Emilio Bossi; Achille Borella; Francesco Vassalli
Ticino 41	4	Conservative People's Party	1	Antonio Luigi Riva
Ticino 42	4	Free Democratic Party	2	Brenno Bertoni; Evaristo Garbani-Nerini
Ticino 42	4	Conservative People's Party	2	Giuseppe Cattori; Alfonso Chicherio
Vaud 43	8	Free Democratic Party	5	Paul Maillefer; Émile Gaudard; Henri Chenaux; Henri Bersier; Gustave Bettex
Vaud 43	8	Liberal Party	3	Alois de Meuron; Robert Cossy; Max de Cérenville
Vaud 44	5	Free Democratic Party	4	Ernest Chuard; Henri Grobet; Louis Reymond; Fritz Bosset
Vaud 44	5	Liberal Party	1	Armand Piguet
Vaud 45	3	Free Democratic Party	2	John-Henri Mermoud; Alfred Jaton
Vaud 45	3	Liberal Party	1	Jean Yersin
Valais 46	4	Conservative People's Party	4	Joseph Kuntschen Sr.; Alexander Seiler; Raymond Evéquoz; Victor Petrig
Valais 47	2	Conservative People's Party	1	Jules Tissières
Valais 47	2	Free Democratic Party	1	Eugène de Lavallaz
Neuchâtel 48	7	Free Democratic Party	3	Paul-Ernest Mosimann; Auguste Leuba; Henri Calame
Neuchâtel 48	7	Liberal Party	2	Eugène Bonhôte; Otto de Dardel
Neuchâtel 48	7	Social Democratic Party	2	Charles Naine; Ernest-Paul Graber
Geneva 49	8	Liberal Party	3	Horace Micheli; Albert-Édouard Maunoir; Frédéric-Jules de Rabours
Geneva 49	8	Free Democratic Party	3	Henri Fazy; Marc-Ernest Peter; Jean-Marc Rochaix
Geneva 49	8	Social Democratic Party	1	Jean Sigg
Geneva 49	8	Conservative People's Party	1	Firmin Ody
Source: Gruner
