= Cantonal School of Graubünden =

High school in Graubünden, Switzerland

Coordinates: 46°50′54″N 9°32′12″E

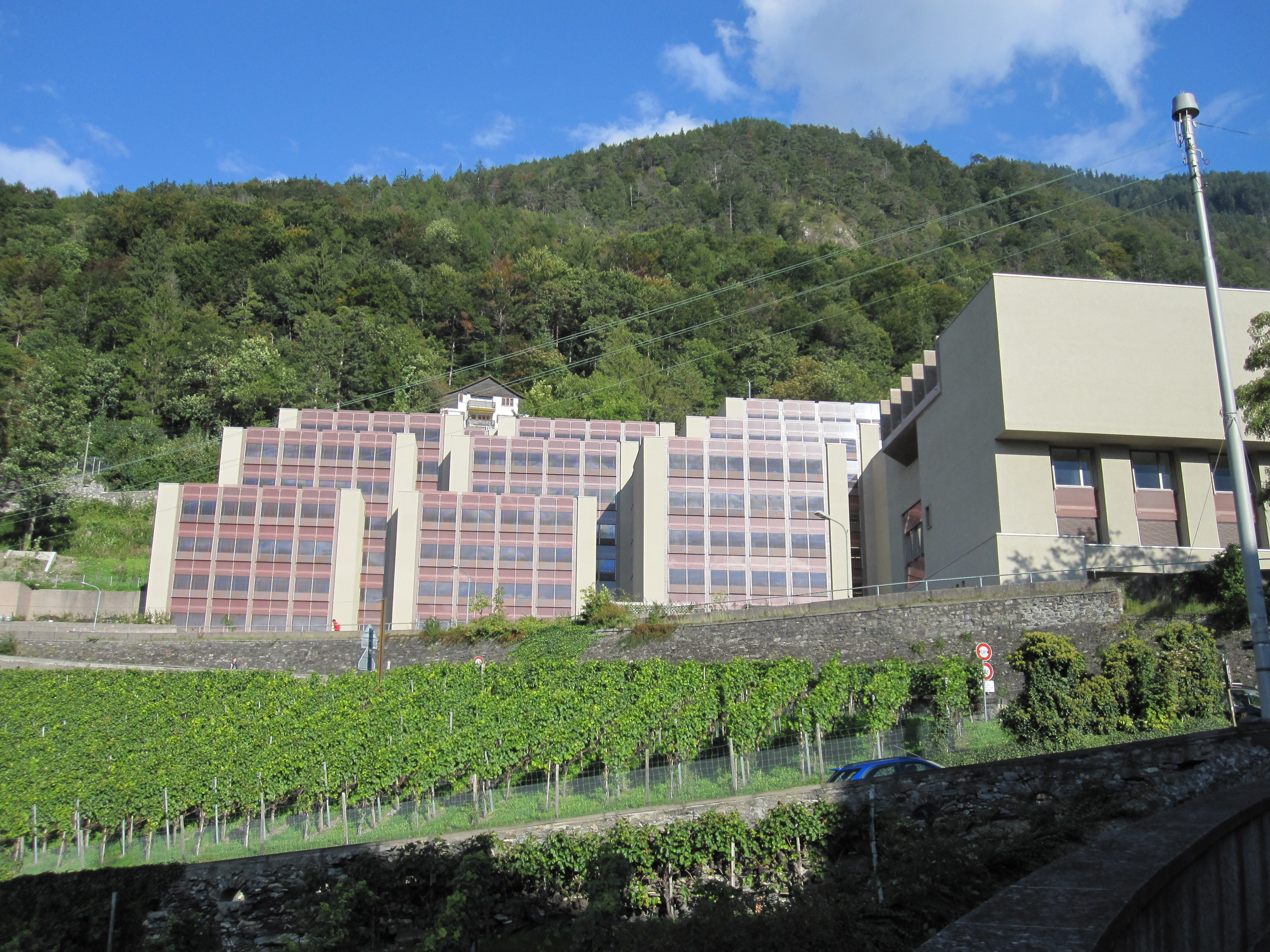
An image of Cantonal School of Graubünden

The Cantonal School of Graubünden (German: Bündner Kantonsschule, also known as Kantonsschule Halde; Romansh: Scola chantunala grischuna; Italian: Scuola cantonale grigione) is the largest high school in the Swiss canton of Graubünden. It is located at the Alte Schanfiggerstrasse / Arosastrasse 2 next to the Theological College in Chur.

== History ==
The school was founded in 1850 by a merger between the Catholic and the Protestant Cantonal Schools, which were both founded in 1804. It was moved to the new building in the same year. According to its name, the Cantonal School of Graubünden is a school for the whole canton, and it is the only school in the whole of Switzerland where three languages must be used (German, Italian, Romansh). There are about 1,250 students (2012) attending classes at the school, taught by approximately 160 teachers.

== Headmasters ==
The school's headmaster is Phillipe Benguerel. The assistant and deputy headmasters are Cristina Maranta, Urs Spirig, Werner Cariget and Frederico Godenzi.

== Former students ==
- Corina Casanova
- Constant Könz
- Iachen Ulrich Könz
- Richard La Nicca
- Rudolf Olgiati
- Andreas Rudolf von Planta
- Alfred von Planta
- Eveline Widmer-Schlumpf
