= Constant Könz =

Swiss artist (born 1929)

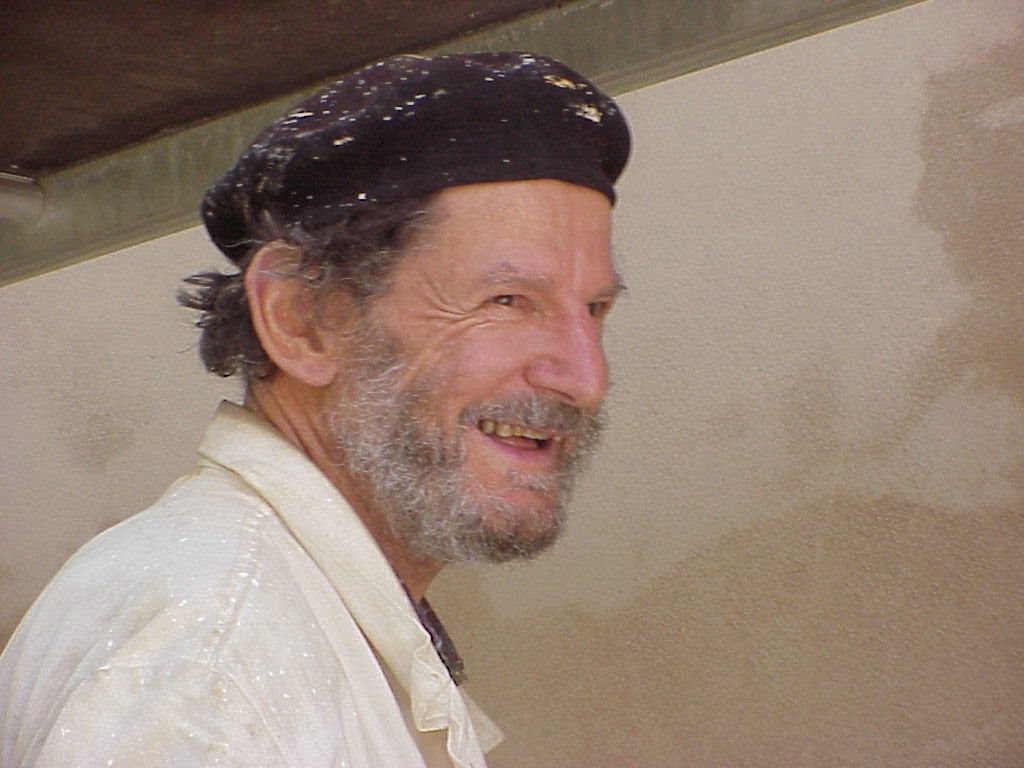
- Könz in 2000
- Born: 10 February 1929 (age 97); Zuoz, Switzerland
- Education: ETH, Zurich; École Supérieure des Beaux-Arts, Geneva
- Style: Sgraffito, Tachisme
- Father: Iachen Ulrich Könz
- Relatives: Steivan Liun Könz (brother)
- Awards: Recognition award of the Canton of Graubünden (1988); Culture Prize of Oberengadin (2014)

Constant Könz (born 10 February 1929) is a Swiss painter, architect, and sgraffito artist. He is known for decorating houses in sgraffito all over Grisons.

== Biography ==
Könz was born in the village Zuoz in 1929. He is the son of the architect and author Iachen Ulrich Könz and Dora Geer. His father remarried with the author Selina Chönz in 1939 and the family moved to Guarda. His half brother was the artist Steivan Liun Könz. Könz grew up in Zuoz and Guarda.

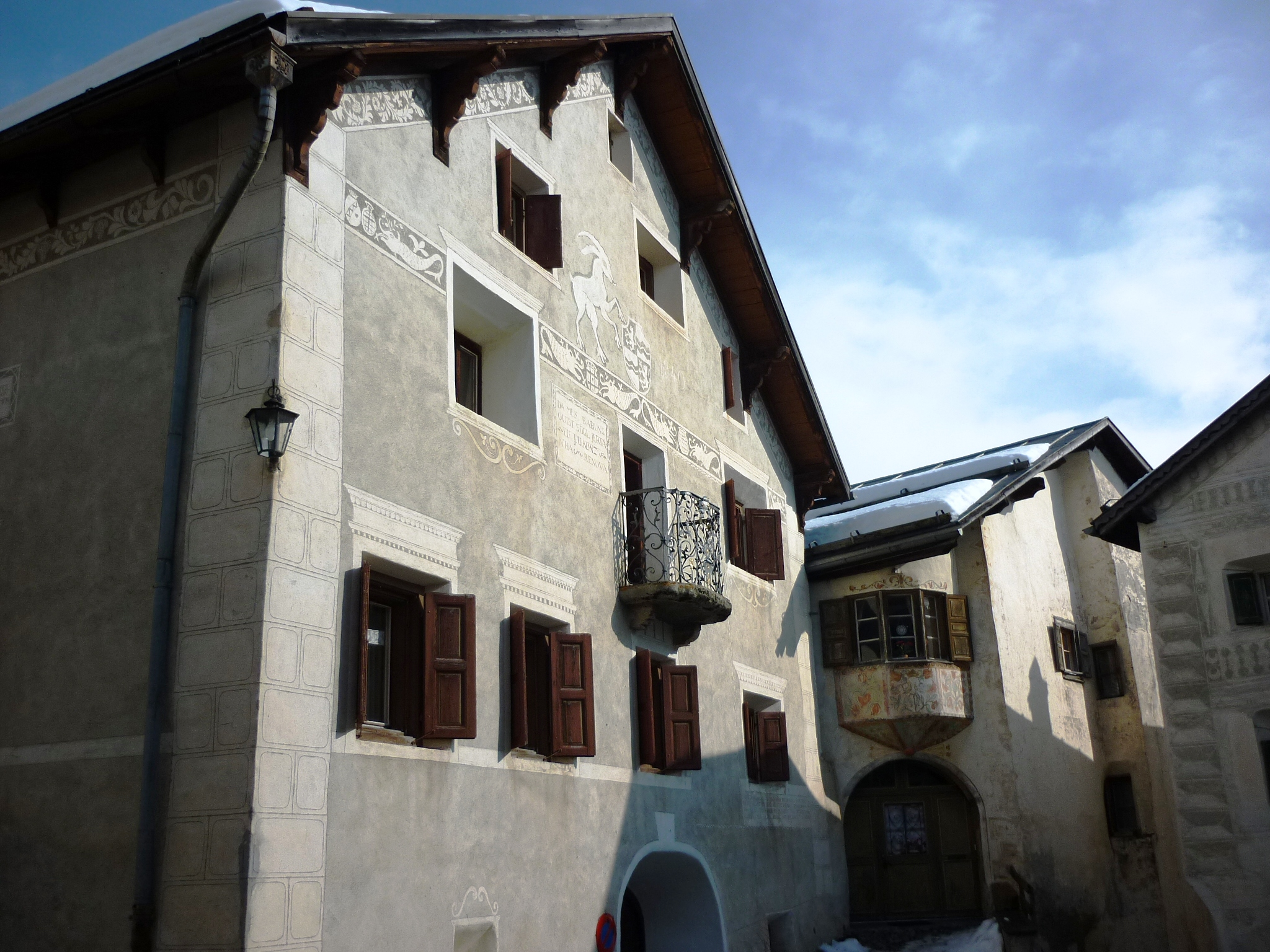
The house in Guarda where Könz spent a part of his childhood.

After secondary education in the Cantonal School of Graubünden (1943–1947) Könz studied architecture in Zurich (1947–1952). He then studied at École Supérieure des Beaux-Arts in Geneva (1952–1956) to become an art teacher. After a visit to Paris in 1957 Könz returned to Switzerland and worked as a teacher 1958–1961 at the Evangelische Mittelschule Schiers in Schiers. Following a car accident he realized the importance of art to him and became a freelance artist.

== Work ==
Könz's sgraffito work can be found all over Graubünden. For instance, groups of houses in the villages Bever, Pontresina, La Punt Chamues-ch, and Ftan and detached houses in the alpine valley regions Engadin, Münstertal, and Albulatal. Könz's murals and paintings can also be seen in public buildings such as schools, courthouses, and banks. Traditional motives are most common in Könz's murals and paintings, but some works feature religious motives. An example of the latter is the three stained glass windows in the church San Luzi in Zuoz. They are called La Cretta (1987), Lebensbaum und lebendiges Feuer (2009), and Sabbatruhe (2010).

Könz is a member of the Gesellschaft Schweizerischer Maler und Bildhauer und Architekten (GSMBA), present name VISARTE, since 1975.

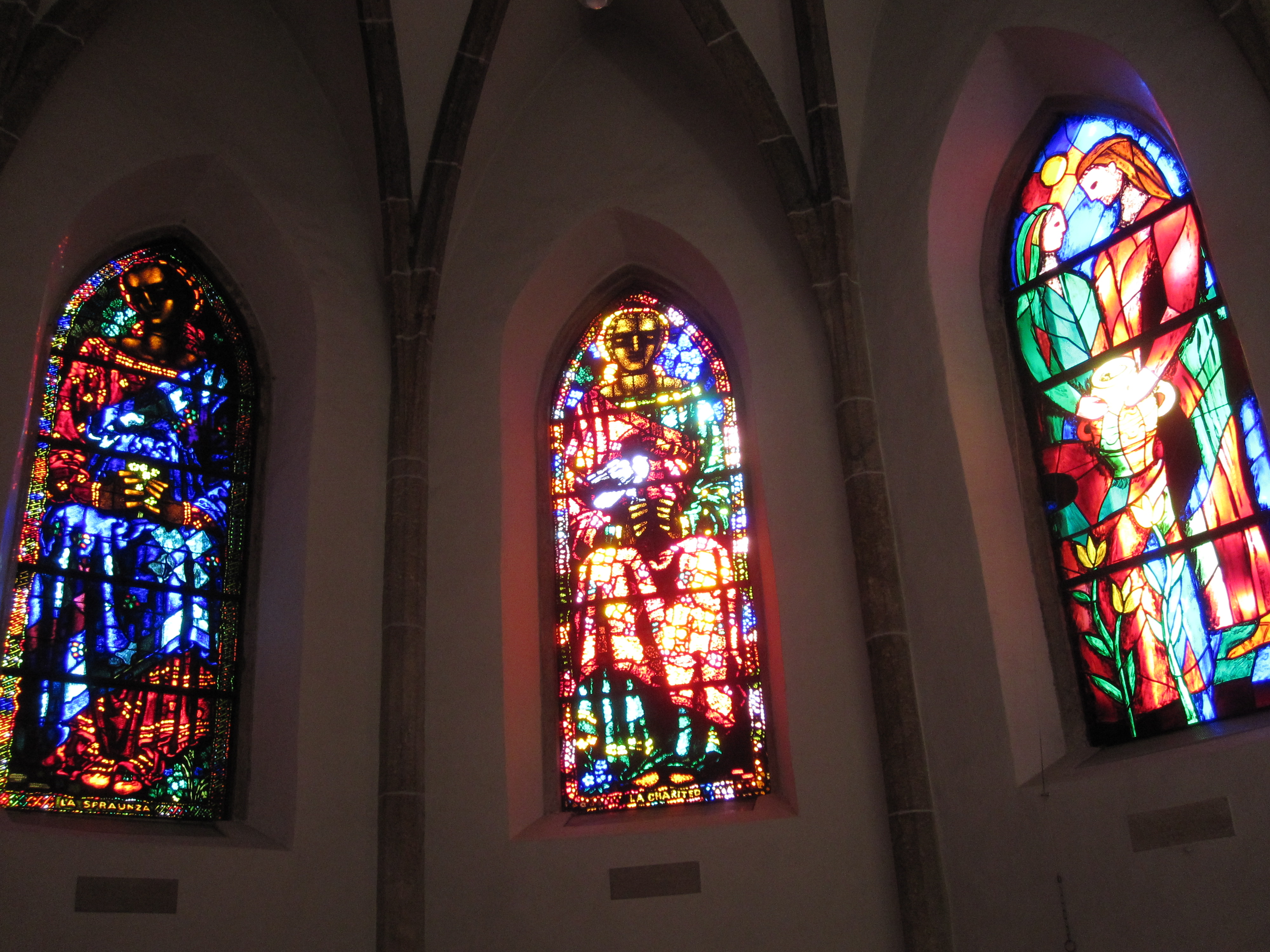
San Luzi church in Zuoz. The rightmost window is La Cretta (1987) by Könz.

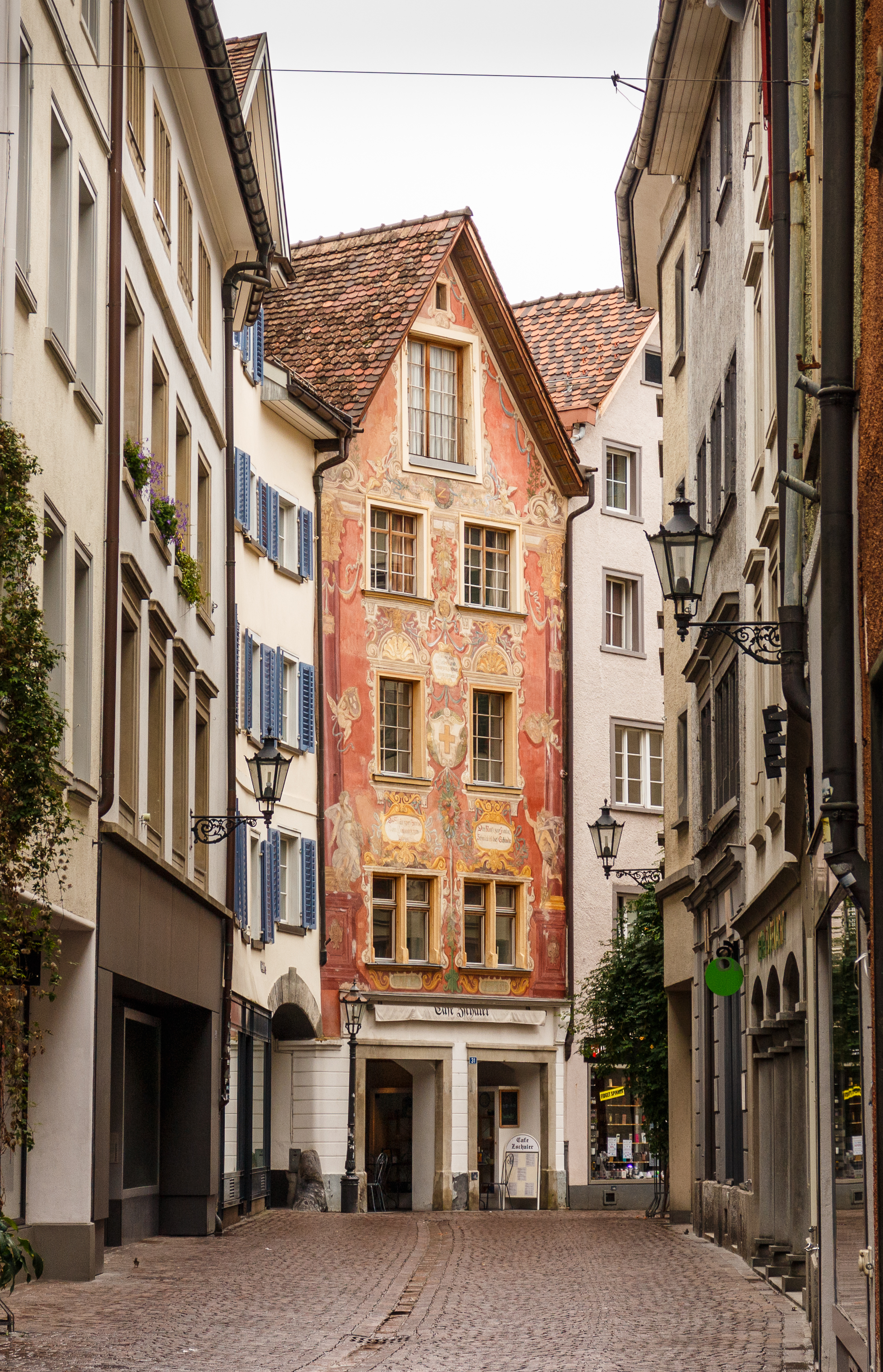
Könz has worked on restorations of the facade of the Zschaler house (Obere Gasse 31) in Chur.

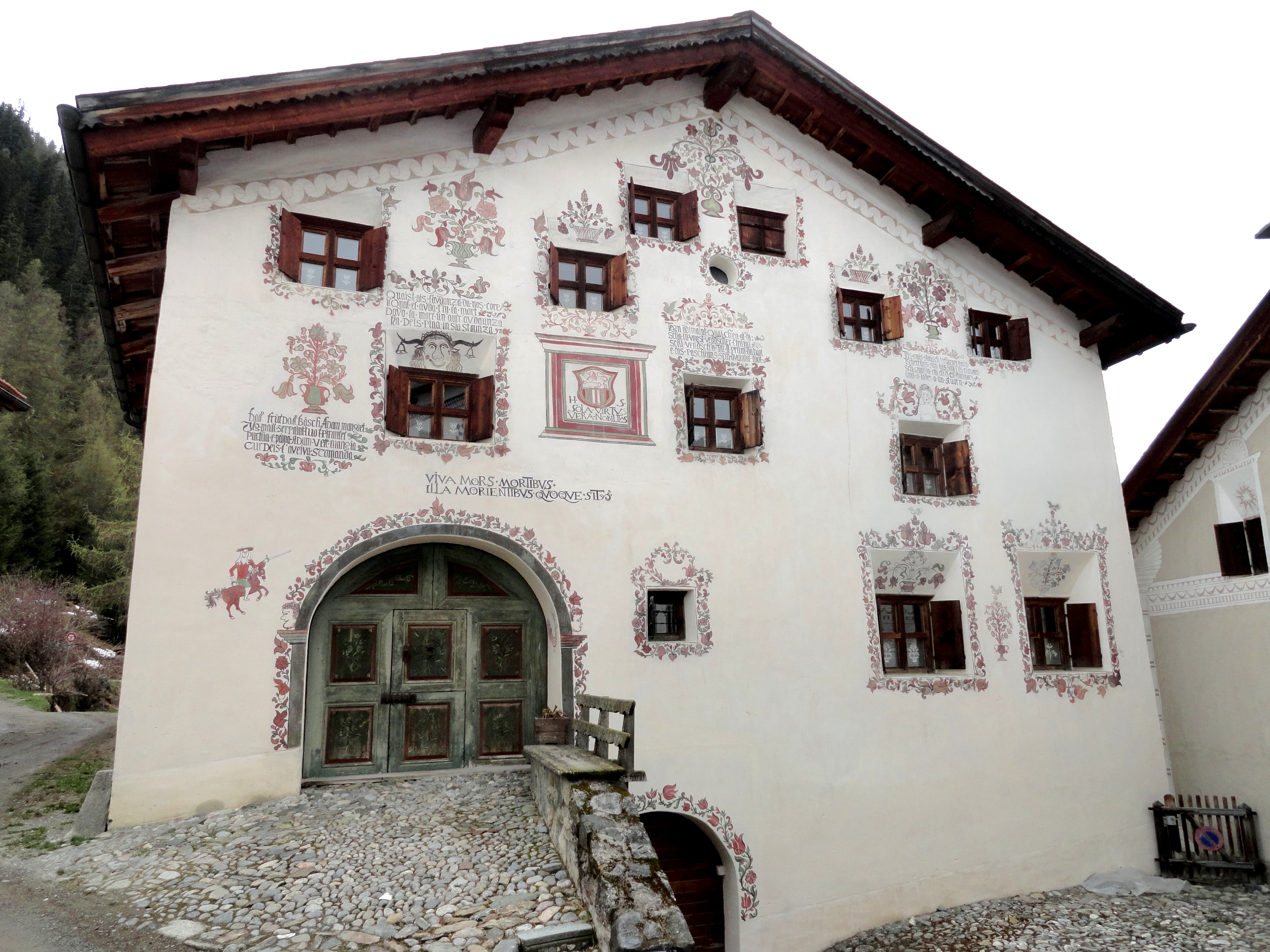
Könz has worked on restorations of the facade of the Tulpenhaus (tulip house) in Sur En.

== Personal life ==
In 1958 Könz married Sibylle Burckhardt of the Burckhardt family. They have two children.

== Awards ==
- 1988 Anerkennungspreis des Kantons Graubünden (Recognition award of the Canton of Graubünden)
- 2012 Premi cultural Paradies (Paradies Culture Prize), awarded by Paradies hotel in Ftan
- 2014 Kulturpreis Oberengadin (Culture Prize of Oberengadin)
