= Virgile Rossel =

Swiss jurist, politician and writer (1858–1933)

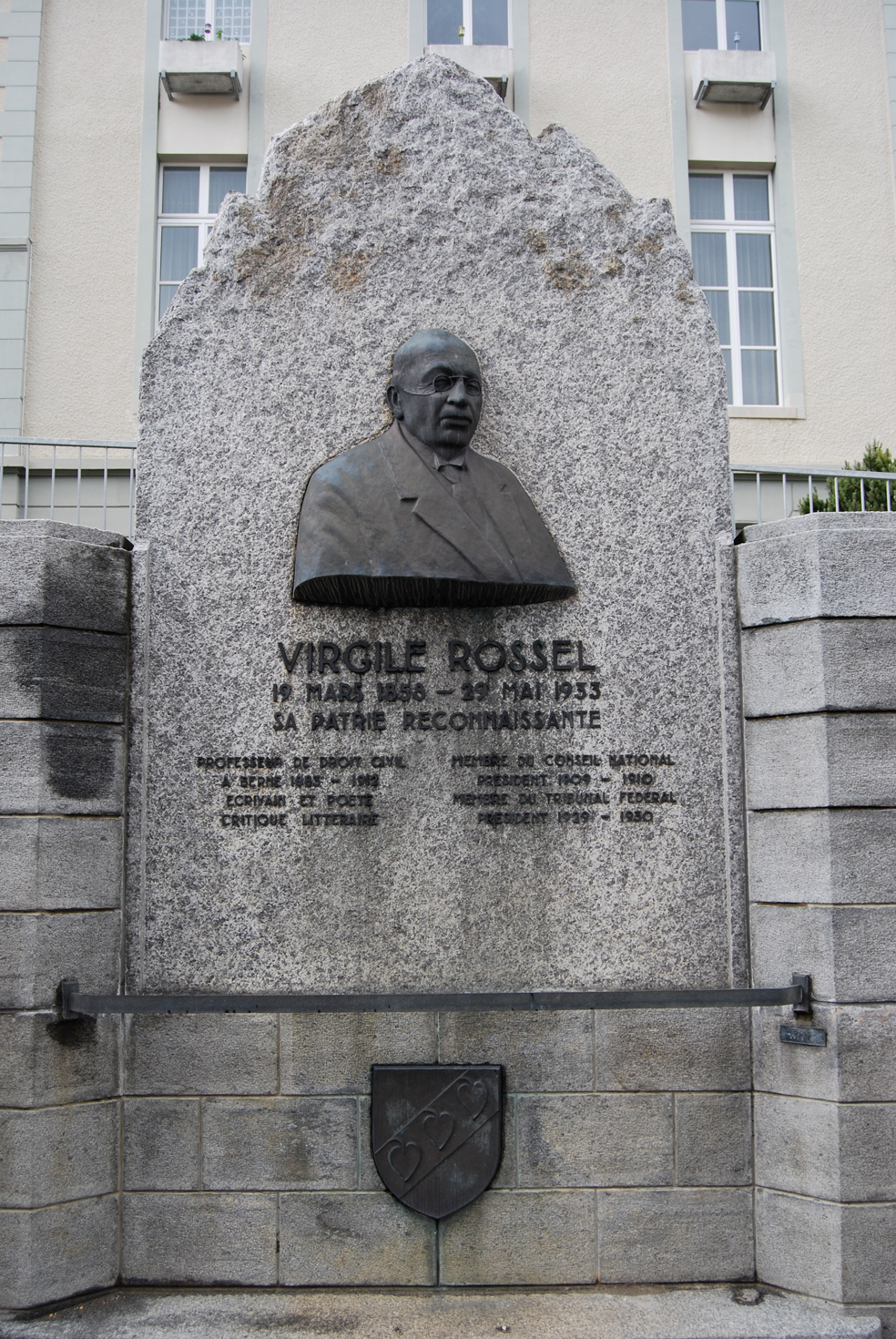
Monument for Virgile Rossel in Tramelan

Histoire littéraire de la Suisse romande des origines à nos jours

Burenfrauen Episode aus dem Burenkriege

Virgile Rossel (19 March 1858 – 29 May 1933) was a Swiss jurist, politician and writer. He was President of the Swiss National Council in 1909/1910 and President of the Federal Supreme Court 1929–1930.

Rossel was born in Tramelan. He graduated in legal and literary studies at the Universities of Leipzig, Berne, Strasbourg and Paris. He received a doctorate in law from the University of Berne in 1879. He also had an honorary doctorate from the University of Geneva in 1909. He began teaching from 1883, when he was appointed a professor of civil law at the University of Berne. He taught until 1912. He was also rector of the university in 1894 and 1907. From 1912 to 1932, Rossel was a judge of the Federal Supreme Court. He was succeeded by his son Jean Rossel.

Avenue Virgile-Rossel in Lausanne and rue Virgile Rossel in Tramelan are named after him. A monument with his portrait in relief by Joseph Constantin Kaiser and Joseph Robert Kaiser was erected in Tramelan.

== Works ==
- Histoire littéraire de la Suisse romande des origines à nos jours, Genève 1889–1891, 2 vol. (rééd. Neuchâtel 1903; Lausanne 1990)
- Histoire du Jura bernois, Genève 1914
- Le Roi des paysans, Lausanne, 1915
- Sorbeval, roman jurassien, Lausanne 1925
- Ce que femme veut..., roman féministe, Neuchâtel, 1931.
- Anne Sentéri : Roman. Mœurs romanches, 1908
- Au cœur de la vie : Vers - Sonnets et poèmes - Petite et grande patrie, Lausanne, 1935
- Blanche Leu et autres nouvelles bernoises, Lausanne, 1913
- Le chemin qui monte : Pièce morale en deux actes, La Neuveville, 1895
- Clément Rochard : Roman de mœurs politiques suisses. La Chaux-de-Fonds, 1903
- Cœurs simples : Roman de mœurs suisses. Genève, 1894
- La course au Bonheur : Roman, Lausanne, 1923
- Davel : Poème dramatique en cinq actes, Lausanne, 1898
- Démétrius : Drame en vers: un prologue, quatre actes, six tableaux, Zurich, 1912
- La démocratie et son évolution. Berne, 1905
- Les deux Forces : Roman, Lausanne 1905
- Eugène Rambert : Sa vie, son temps et son œuvre. Lausanne, 1917
- Le flambeau : Roman, Lausanne, 1920
- Le grand jour : Roman. Lausanne, 1929
- Histoire de la littérature française hors de France, Lausanne, 1895
- Histoire des relations littéraires entre la France et l'Allemagne, Genève, 1970, réédition
- Histoire littéraire de la Suisse romande des origines à nos jours, Neuchâtel, 1903
- Jours difficiles : Roman de mœurs suisses, Genève, 1896
- Là-haut sur la Montagne ... : Poèmes alpestres, Lausanne, 1921
- Le Maître : Roman, Lausanne, 1906
- Une mère : Épisode de la guerre Anglo-transvaalienne. Drame en un acte en vers. Lausanne, 1901
- Morgarten : Drame en quatre actes en vers, Lausanne, 1905
- Le peuple Roi ou Grandeur et misères de la démocratie, Lausanne, 1933
- Robert Caze : notes et souvenirs, Porrentruy, 1983, réédition
- Le roman d'un Neutre, Lausanne, 1918
- La seconde Jeunesse : Journal d'un Poète. Lausanne, 1888
- La vaudoise : Pièce en trois actes. Lausanne, 1907
- Poèmes suisses, Lausanne, 1893
- Rossel, Virgile (1893). Louis Ruchonnet: Sa vie, son esprit, son œuvre (in French). Lausanne: F. Payot.
- Rossel, Virgile (1909). Un magistrat républicain : le conseiller fédéral Schenk (in French). Delémont.

Preceded by Adolf Germann	President of the National Council; 1909/1910	Succeeded by Joseph Kuntschen
