= John Syz Sr. =

Swiss businessman and diplomat

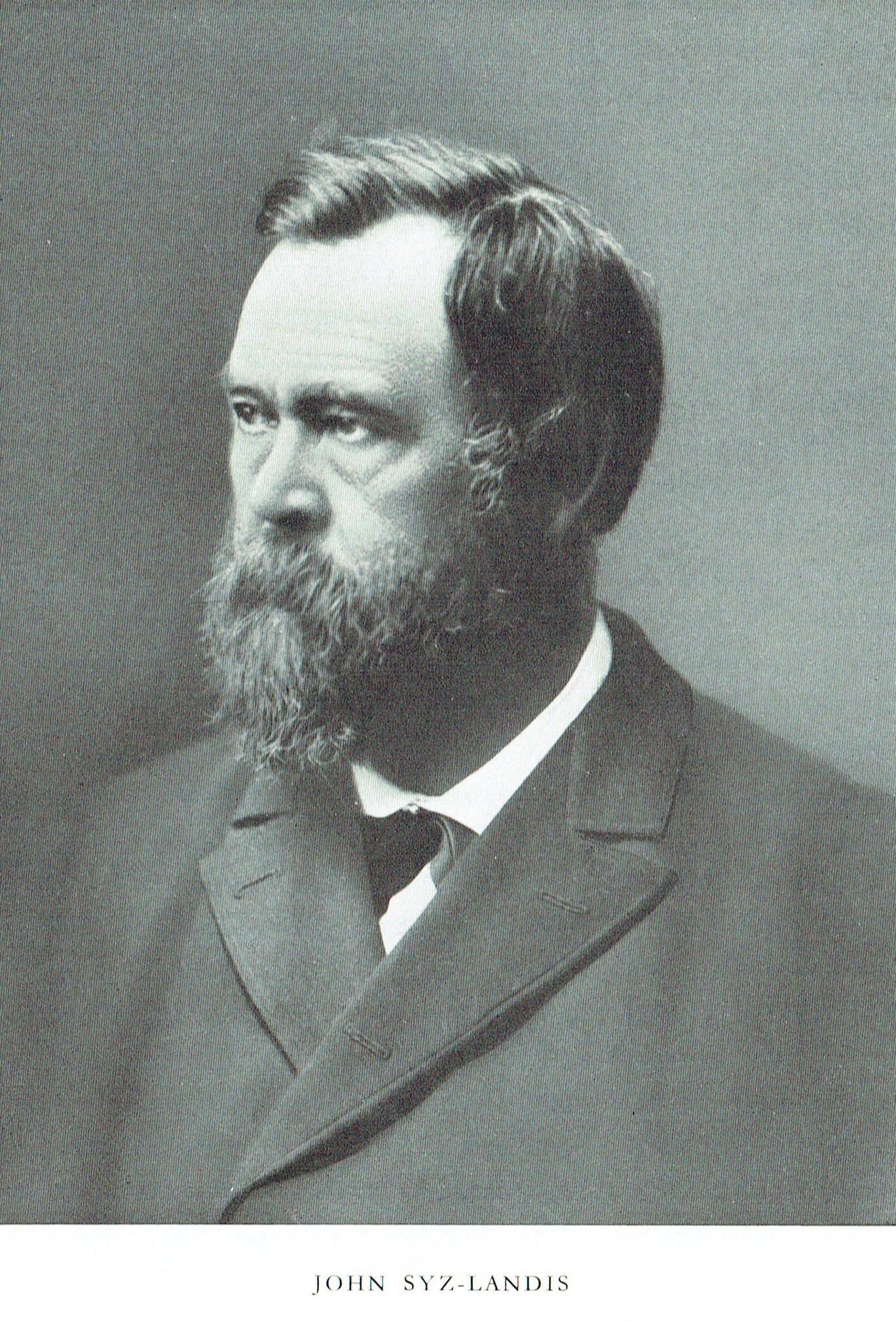

Consul General of Switzerland to Philadelphia, Pennsylvania
- In office 4 August 1846 – 1 January 1856

Personal details
- Born: Johannes Syz; December 31, 1822 Knonau, Switzerland
- Died: December 21, 1883 (aged 60) Zurich, Switzerland
- Relations: Hans Syz (grandson)
- Children: 6, including John
- Occupation: Businessman, diplomat

John Syz Sr. respectively Johannes Syz (31 December 1822 – 21 December 1883) was a Swiss businessman and diplomat who served as Honorary Consul of Switzerland to Philadelphia from 1846 to 1853. After his consular assignment, he was active as merchant in Philadelphia and New York City.

In 1861, Syz and family returned to Switzerland, where he became the owner of Weberei Dietikon (Dietikon weaving mills), which were later taken over by his son John Syz. He also was the co-founder of Zurich Insurance Group, Schweizerische Allgemeine (presently Helvetia Insurance) and served as a board member of Credit Suisse.

== Personal life ==
In 1850, Syz married Anna Landis (1831–1901), a daughter of Hans Heinrich Landis (1806–1873), textile manufacturer, and Katharina Landis (née Hürlimann; 1804–1872), both of Richterswil on Lake Zurich. They had six children;

- Harry William Syz (1853–1910), industrialist, married to German-born Maria Adamina Günther (1865–1936), originally of Frankfurt am Main. They had three children, including Hans Syz.
- Anna Selina Syz (1856–1926), married to Gustav von Schulthess-Rechberg (1852–1916). Three sons.
- John Syz (1859–1939), businessman and politician, married to Clara Schindler. Three children.
- Georg William Syz (1861–1946), merchant, silk manufacturer and diplomat, married to Anna Margaretha Hünerwadel. They had one son.
- Gertrud Syz (born 1867), married to Georg Heinrich von Wyss (vom Angel), two children.

Syz died December 21, 1883 in Zurich, Switzerland aged 60.
