= Iachen Ulrich Könz =

Swiss architect (1899–1980)

- Born: 20 February 1899; Arezzo, Italy
- Died: 25 December 1980 (aged 81); Samedan, Switzerland
- Education: ETH Zurich; HFT Stuttgart
- Occupation: Architect
- Spouses: Dora Geer; Selina Chönz
- Children: Constant Könz; Steivan Liun Könz

Iachen Ulrich Könz (20 February 1899 – 25 December 1980) was a Swiss architect, conservator-restorer, and author.

== Biography ==
Iachen Ulrich Könz was born in 1899 in Arezzo, Tuscany. He was the son of the merchant Peider Könz and Constanza (born Vital). He studied architecture at ETH in Zürich and Stuttgart Technology University of Applied Sciences in Germany.

Könz was married to Dora Geer and they had four sons. One of them is the painter Constant Könz. In 1939 Könz remarried with the author Selina Chönz (born Meyer). They had one son, the painter Steivan Liun Könz.

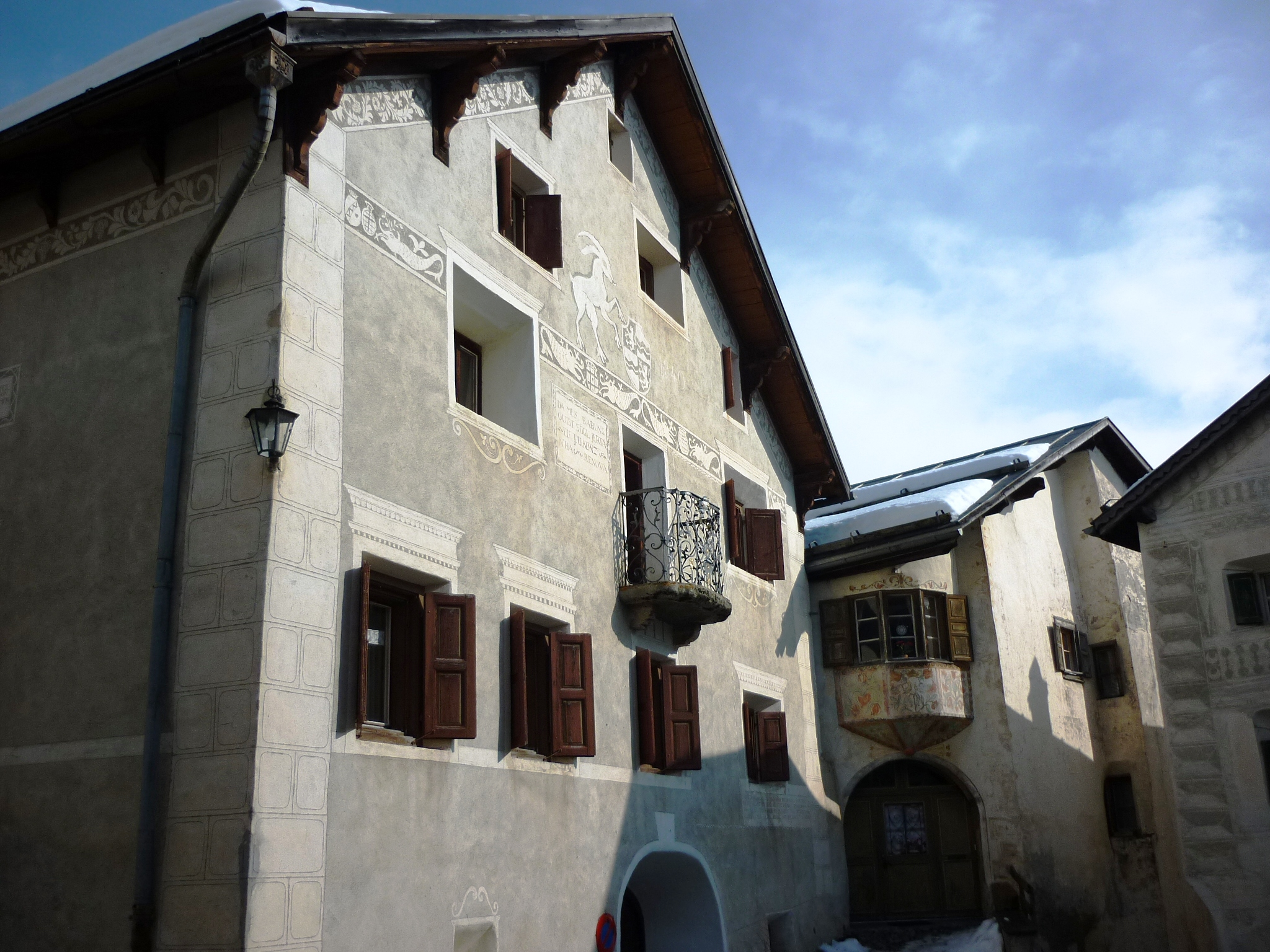
Könz's house in Guarda.

== Work ==
Könz started an architecture firm which he ran in Davos (1926–1927), then Zuoz, and from 1939 in Guarda. Könz worked on a number of different constructions and restorations in Grüabunden, such as the machine house of the power station at Zervreilasee, the Wildenberg castle in Zernez, and the house Casa Grande (Ciäsa Granda) in Stampa. One notable category is the restoration work on several churches in Graubünden, e.g. the reformation church in Zuoz, the reformation church in Giarsun and the tower of the reformation church in Guarda. His main work is, however, the major building restoration of the village Guarda between 1939 and 1945.

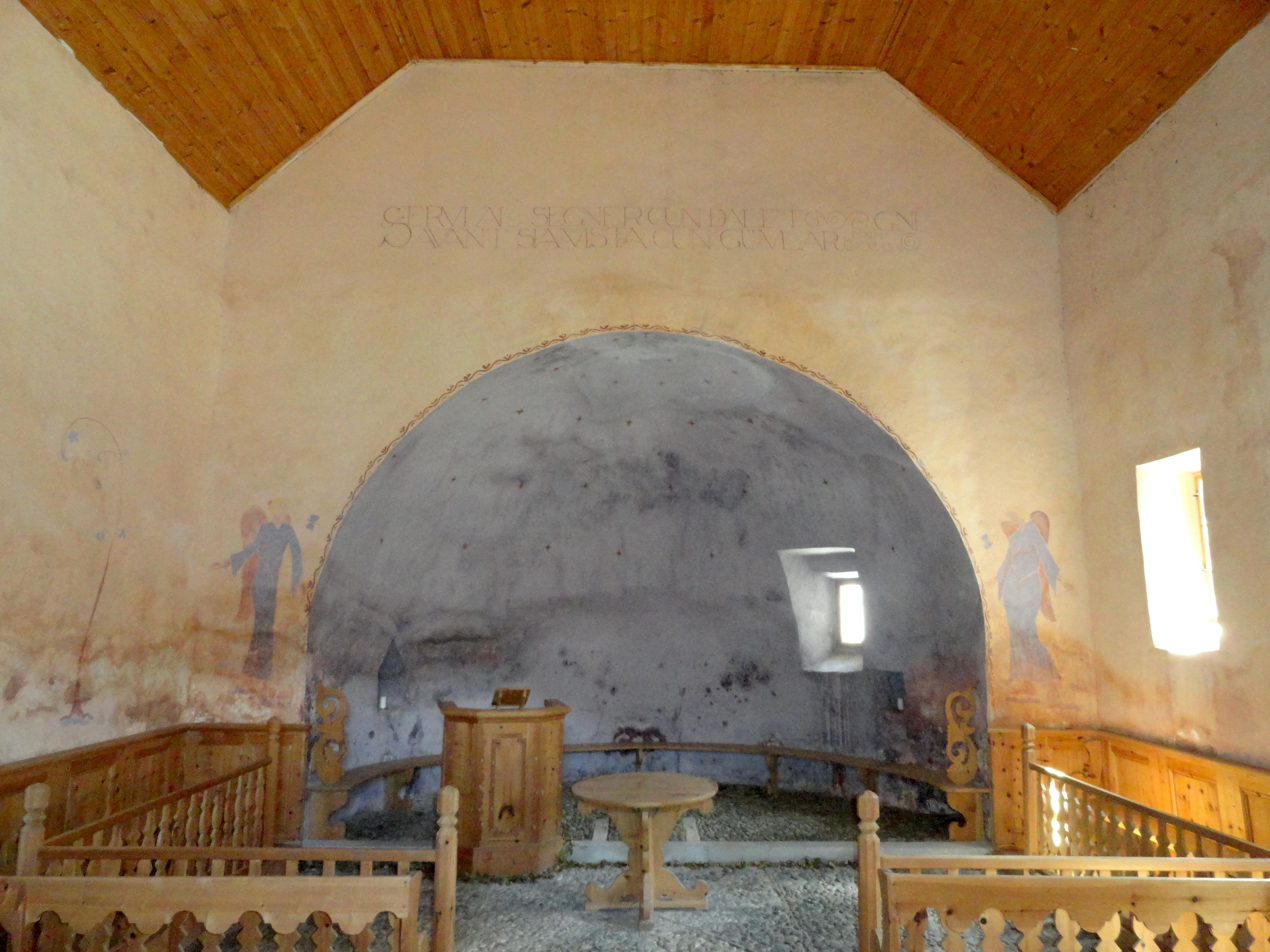
Church in Giarsun

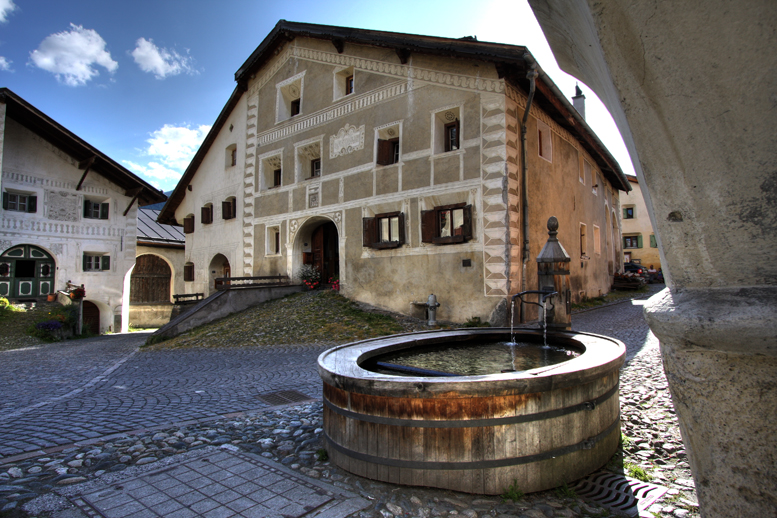
Guarda

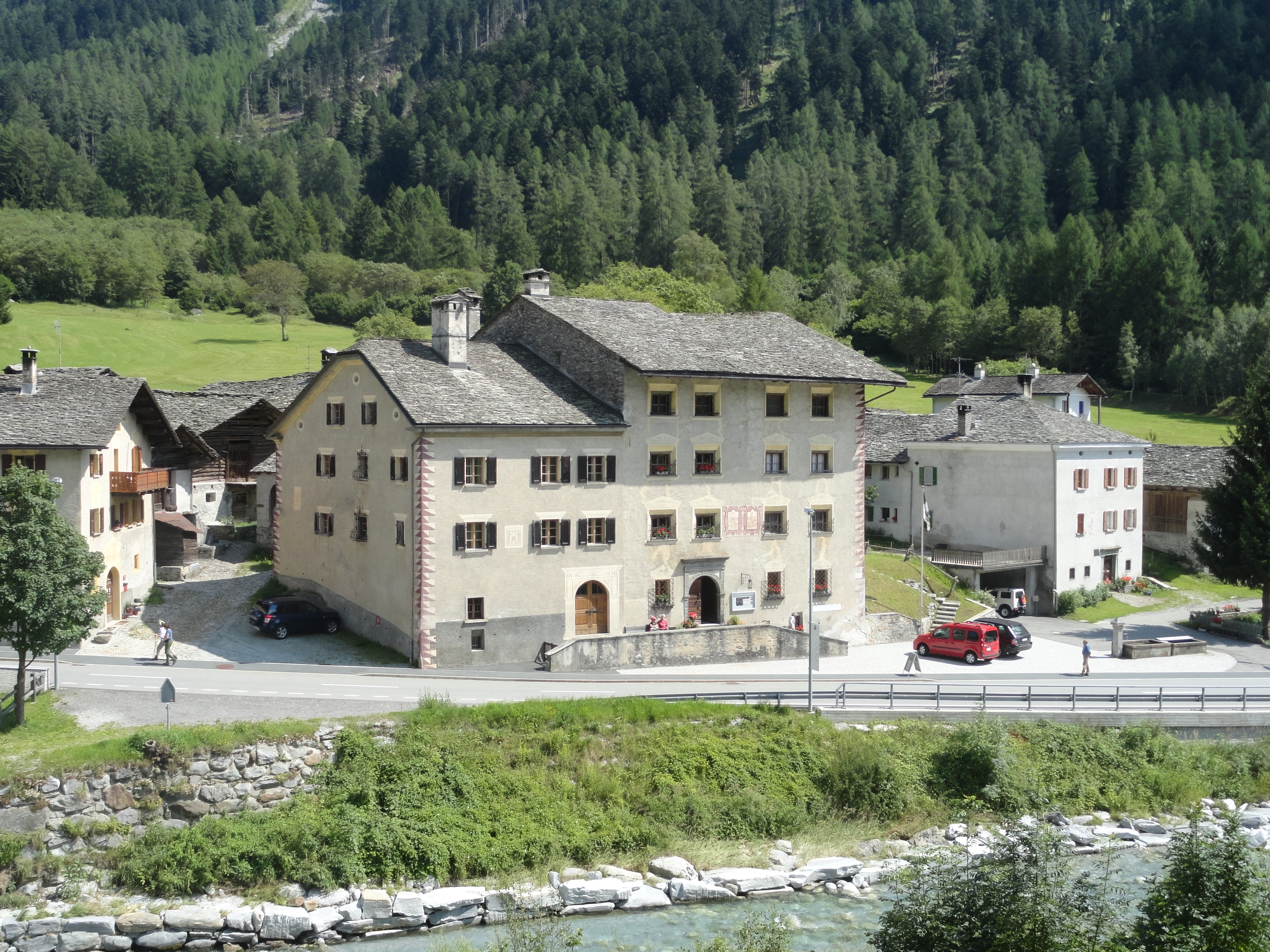
Casa Grande in Stampa

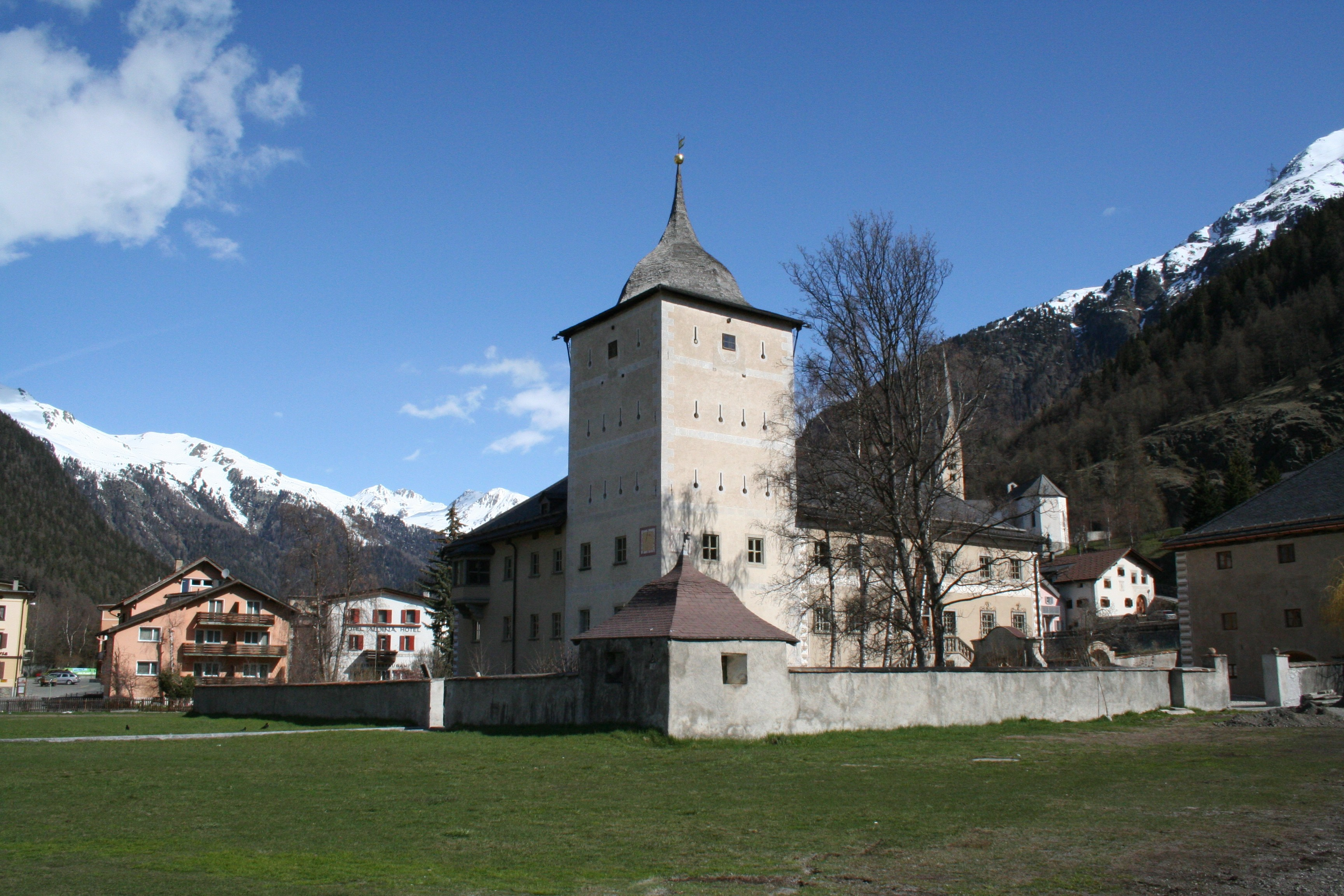
Wildenberg castle in Zernez

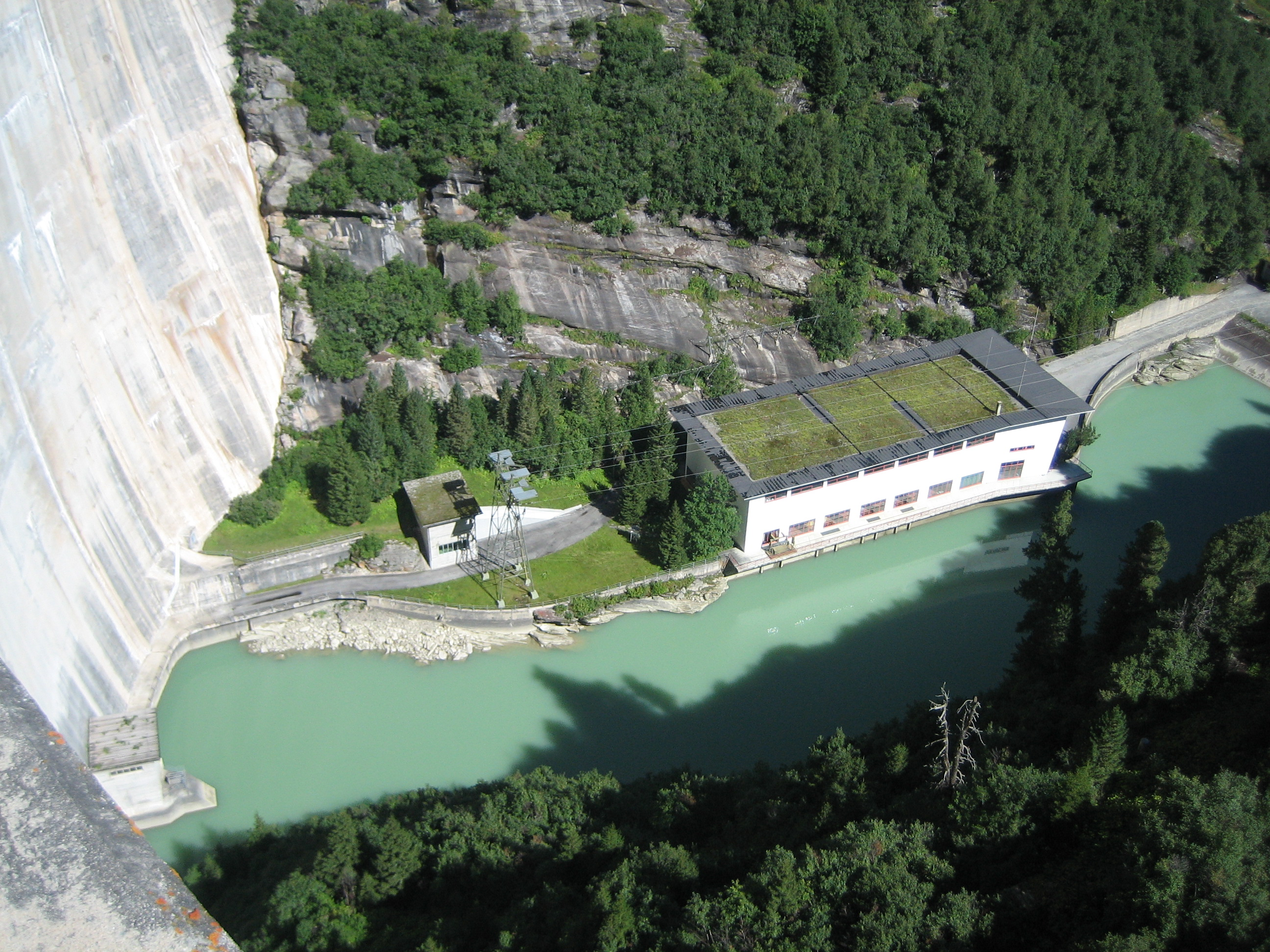
Machine house of the power station at Zervreilasee

== Awards ==
- 1954 Premio per l’architettura e l’urbanistica montana from University of Turin
- 1978 Culture prize from the Kulturzentrums Laudinella in St. Moritz

== Bibliography ==
- Könz, Iachen Ulrich (1952). Das Engadiner Haus. Bern: Paul Haupt. ISBN 3-258-03215-7.
- Könz, Iachen Ulrich (1976). Guarda. Bern: Paul Haupt. ISBN 3-258-02430-8.
- Könz, Iachen Ulrich (1977). Sgraffito im Engadin und Bergell. Zurich: Atlantis. ISBN 3-7611-0524-X.
