= Linus Birchler =

Swiss art historian (1893–1967)

- Birchler around 1950
- Born: 24 April 1893; Einsiedeln, Switzerland
- Died: 2 January 1967 (aged 73); Männedorf, Switzerland
- Occupations: Art historian; professor
- Employer: ETH Zurich
- Spouse: Rose Schill
- Awards: Central Switzerland Culture Prize (1962)

Linus Birchler (24 April 1893 – 2 January 1967) was a Swiss art historian and a specialist in the early Middle Ages and the Baroque in Switzerland. He was professor at ETH Zurich from 1934 to 1961 and president of the Federal Commission for Monument Preservation (Eidgenössische Kommission für Denkmalpflege) from 1942 to 1963.

== Biography ==
Linus Birchler was the son of Ferdinand Birchler, a hardware dealer, and Louise née Kälin. He married Rose Schill, daughter of Emil, a painter. After attending the Gymnasium in Einsiedeln, he first studied law in Zurich, then art history (under Professor Josef Zemp), music, and French and German literature in Zurich, Basel, and Munich. He received his doctorate in 1924.

Birchler was a specialist in the early Middle Ages and the Baroque in Switzerland. He also tried his hand at literature, writing poems, novellas, and a novel. In Einsiedeln he initiated the revival of performances of religious plays (the Welttheater, from 1924). In October 1924 he was among the founders of the Societas Sancti Lucae, an association of Swiss Catholic artists and art lovers.

From 1927 to 1935 he wrote the volumes of the series Die Kunstdenkmäler der Schweiz on the cantons of Schwyz, which were the first of the entire series to appear, and Zug. He was a pioneer of the inventorying of art monuments. From 1934 to 1961 he was professor of architectural history and general art history at ETH Zurich, and from 1942 to 1963 president of the Federal Commission for Monument Preservation. In 1951 he was a co-founder and the first president of the Swiss Institute for Art Research (Schweizerisches Institut für Kunstwissenschaft). In 1962 he received the Central Switzerland Culture Prize (Innerschweizer Kulturpreis). He was scientific director and adviser for the restoration of many art monuments, among them the convent of St. John the Baptist in Müstair, the church of St. Justus in Flums, and the parish church of St. John the Baptist in Bernhardzell.

== Bibliography ==
- A. A. Schmid (ed.), Corolla Heremitana, 1964
- Erinnerungen an Linus Birchler, 1993
- M. Stettler, Lehrer und Freunde, 1997
