= Alfred von Planta =

Swiss politician

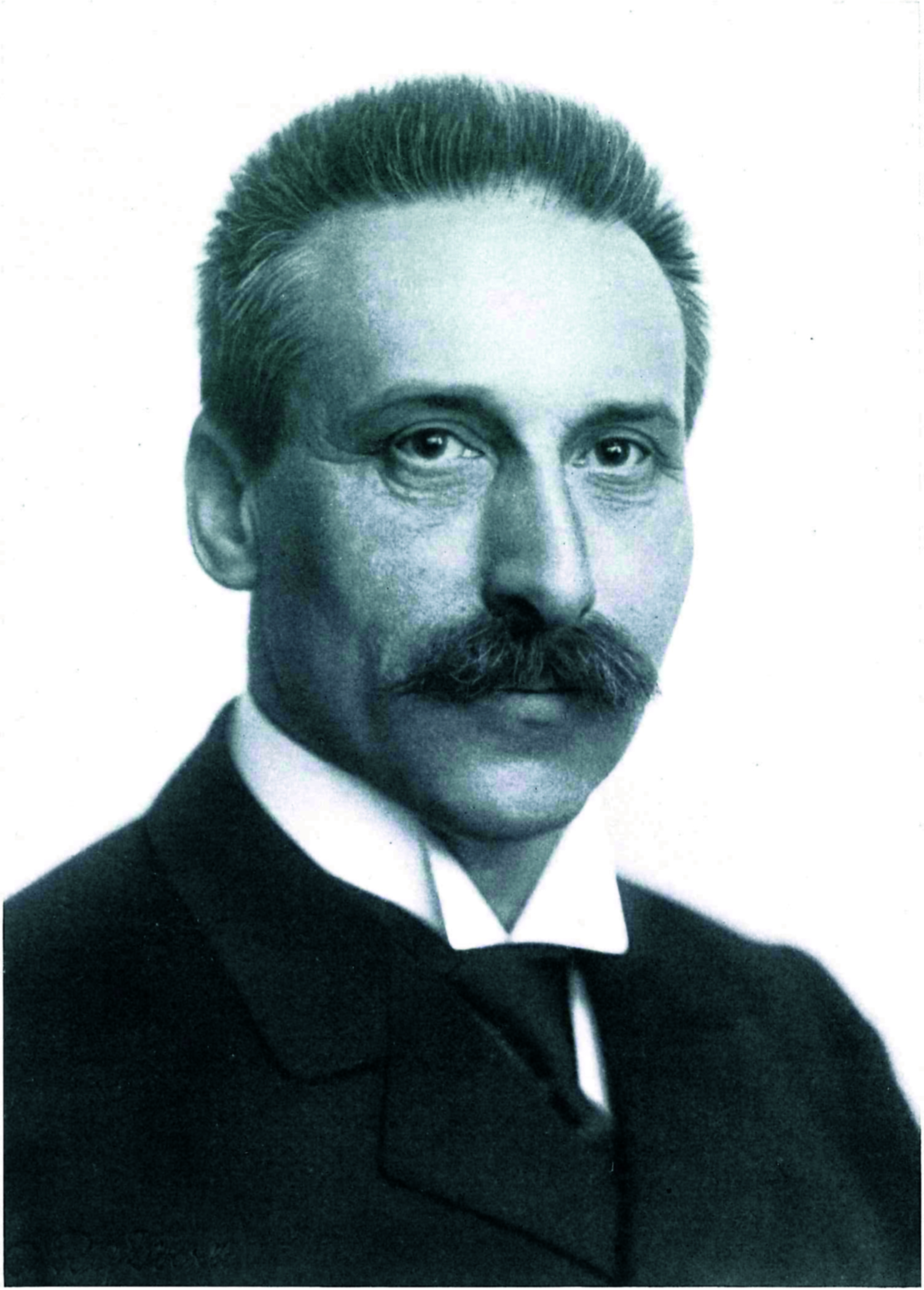
Alfred von Planta (year unknown)

Alfred von Planta (1 April 1857, in Tamins – 2 March 1922, in Davos) was a Swiss politician and President of the Swiss National Council (1913/1914).

Preceded by Carl Spahn	President of the National Council; 1913/1914	Succeeded by Félix Bonjour
