= John Syz =

Swiss businessman and politician (1859-1939)

Member of the National Council (Switzerland)
- In office 4 June 1917 – 1 November 1919
- Constituency: Canton of Zurich

Member of the Cantonal Council of Zurich
- In office 1909 – 1917

Personal details
- Born: John Syz; 23 March 1859 Brooklyn, New York, U.S.
- Died: 27 March 1939 (aged 80) Zurich, Switzerland
- Party: The Liberals
- Spouse: Clara Schindler (m. 1891)
- Relations: Hans Syz (nephew)
- Children: 3
- Occupation: Businessman, association functionary, politician

John Syz (23 March 1859 – 27 March 1939) was an American-born Swiss businessman, association functionary and politician who most notably served on the National Council (Switzerland) for The Liberals from 1917 to 1919. He previously served on the Cantonal Council of Zürich from 1909 to 1917.

Through his business activity, as the proprietor of cotton weaving mills, Syz became a negotiator of international trade deals with Woodrow Wilson in 1917 regarding the export of copper, cotton, grain and other commodities, for Switzerland. He later also presided the Zurich Chamber of Commerce and served on several company boards.

== Early life and education ==
Syz was born 23 March 1859 in Brooklyn, New York, the fourth of six children, to Johannes Syz (1822–1883), a merchant and consul, and Anna Syz (née Landis). His father hailed from the well established Syz family originally from the Freiamt of Affoltern (presently Affoltern District).

In 1861, the family returned to Switzerland, where his father purchased the Haus zum Greifenstein, where he and his siblings were raised. He spent all his vacations with his grandparents in Richterswil on Lake Zurich. After completing the Matura, he studied at Ecole de Commerce in Lausanne, followed by a commercial apprenticeship at Cramer, Frey & Co. He then spent several years abroad in Paris, London and the United States.

== Career ==
In 1890, Syz became a partner in the Weberei Dietikon (cotton weaving mills), in Dietikon near Zurich. In 1900, he acquired the entire company, and gradually turned it into Syz & Co. He was active on several associations of the cotton industry, on a municipal, regional and even international level. In 1917, Syz served as a delegate and negotiator, to represent Switzerland in a trade negotiation with Woodrow Wilson.

== Personal life ==
In 1891, Syz was married to Susanna "Clara" Schindler, daughter of Caspar Schindler, a wealthy silk manufacturer and philanthropist, and Elise Escher. Her father also served as honorary consul of Austria-Hungary from 1872 to 1885. They had two daughters and one son;

- Lilly Syz (1892–1983), married to Werner Sebes.
- Dr. med. Hans Caspar Syz (1894–1991), married Emily Burrow (1909–2002), they had two sons and a daughter.
- Hildegard "Hilde" Syz, married Max Tschudi.

In 1935, Syz was among the wealthiest citizens of Switzerland, with an estimated taxable net worth of 10,629 million Swiss Francs (approximately $95 million in modern equivalency).

He died 27 March 1939 in Zurich, Switzerland aged 80.
