= Henri Fazy =

Swiss politician and historian

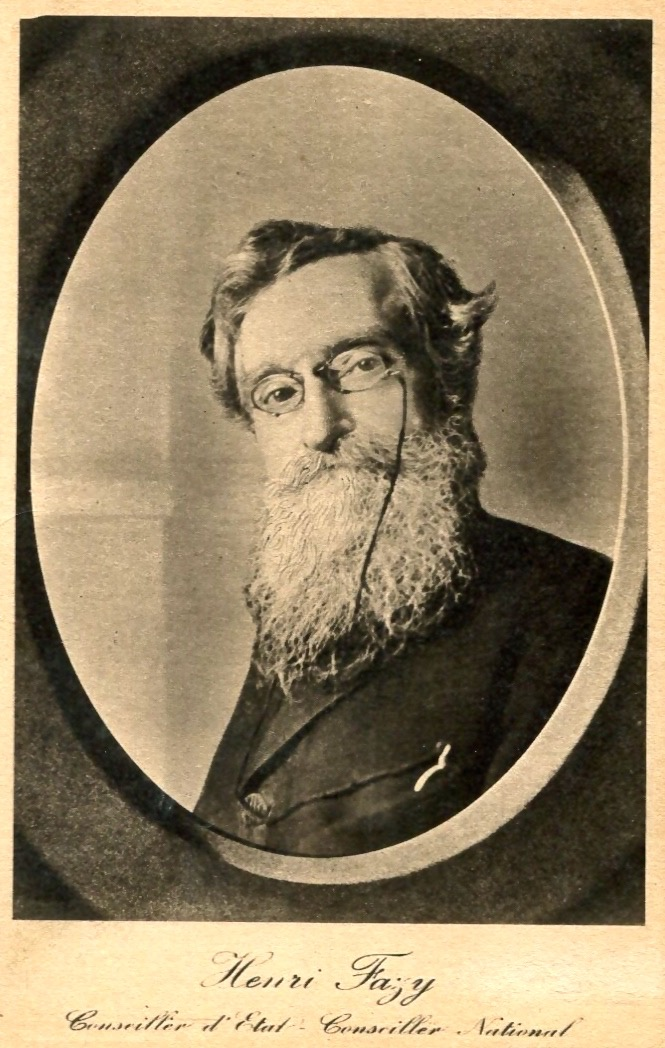
Henri Fazy

Henri Fazy (31 January 1842 – 22 December 1920) was a Swiss politician and historian. As professor of Swiss history, he wrote much on the history of Geneva.

== Biography ==
Fazy was born on 31 January 1842 in Bern. He was a member of a family which at the date of the Revocation of the Edict of Nantes (1685) came from Dauphiné to Geneva to seek protection for religious reasons. The most prominent member of the family was the Radical statesman James Fazy, his great uncle, whose biography he wrote in 1887.

Henri Fazy studied at Geneva for his doctorate in philosophy and law, became a member of the Genevese cantonal parliament in 1868, and was a member of the cantonal executive from 1897 until his death. He was a Radical in politics, but of a more moderate type than his great uncle, and founded a Radical group opposed to the more extreme section which his great uncle led. Carteret, the successor of James Fazy as leader of the latter, died in 1889, and henceforward Henri Fazy played a more and more prominent part in Radical Genevese politics. As a member of the canton of Geneva's executive, Fazy had charge of the department of finances and was much criticised by Gustave Ador, the leader of the Democrats or Whigs. In 1880, his proposal to separate church and state in Geneva was rejected by the people but was finally accepted by them in 1907. He was a member of the Swiss Conseil National from 1896 to 1899, and from 1902 onwards. After the Radical defeat of 1918, Fazy was the only member of his party who was not turned out of office, but he became more and more conservative as time went on.

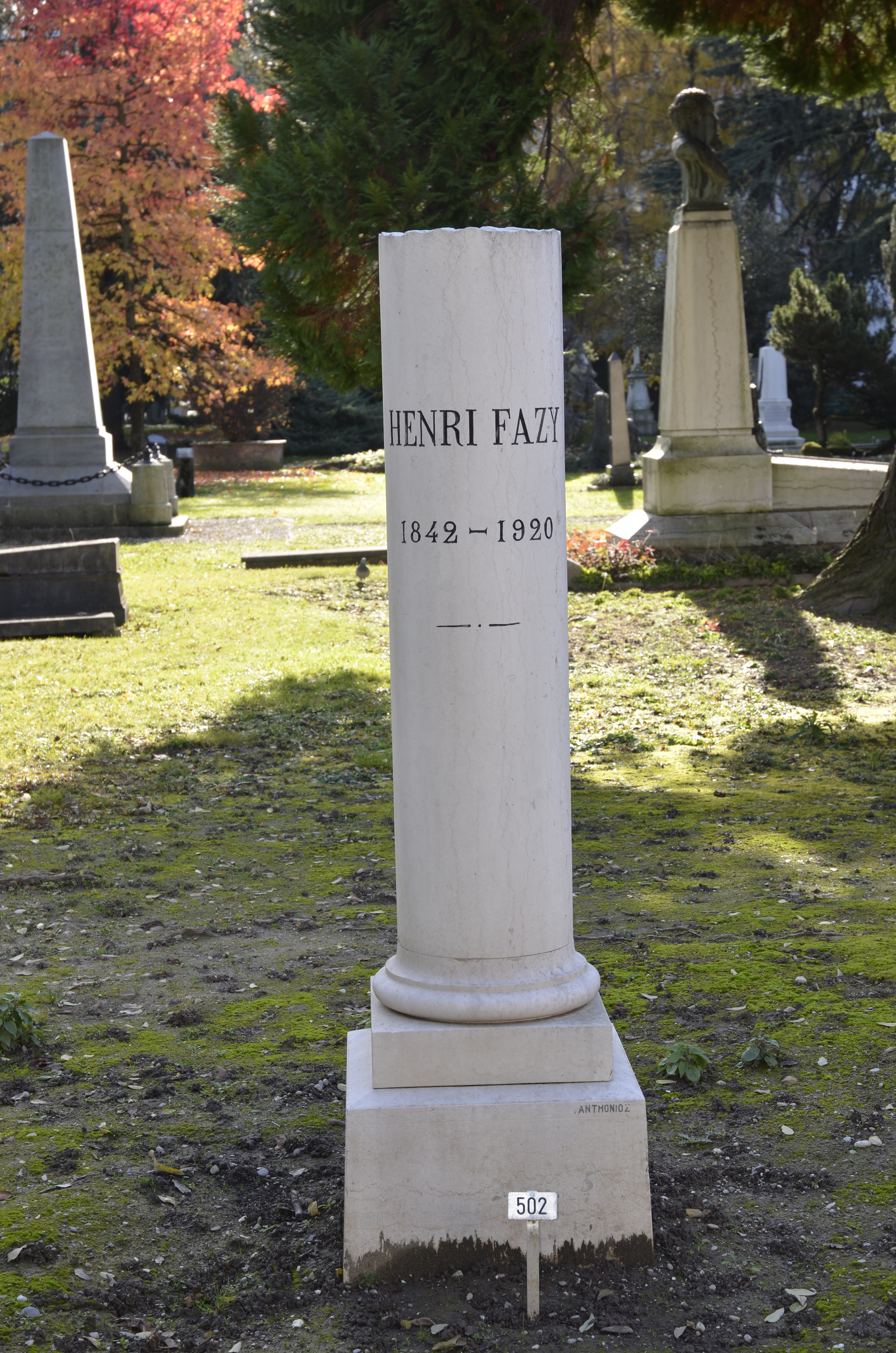
Tomb of Henri Fazy at the Cimetière des Rois, Geneva

For many years, Fazy was the archivist of Geneva, and also a professor of Swiss history at the University of Geneva (1896–1899 and from 1902). He died on 22 December 1920 in Geneva.

== Writing ==
As professor of Swiss history, he wrote much on the history of Geneva. Among his works are:

- Life of James Fazy (1887)
- Constitutions de Genève (1890)
- L'Alliance de 1584 entre Berne, Zurich et Genève (1891)
- Les Suisses et la Neutralité de Savoie (1895)
- La Guerre du Pays de Gex et l'Occupation genevoise, 1589-1601 (1897)
- Histoire de Genève a l'Epoque de l'Escalade, 1589-1601 (1902)
- Genève et Charles Emmanuel (1909)

He published many papers in the Proceedings of the Institut National Genevois.
