= Joseph Kuntschen =

Swiss politician

Joseph Kuntschen (12 November 1849 – 16 April 1928) was a Swiss politician and President of the Swiss National Council (1910/1911).

Preceded by Virgile Rossel	President of the National Council; 1910/1911	Succeeded by Karl Emil Wild
