= Carl Spahn =

Swiss politician

Carl Spahn (25 February 1863 – 19 February 1943) was a Swiss politician, mayor of Schaffhausen (1895–1917) and President of the Swiss National Council (1912/1913).

Preceded by Karl Emil Wild	President of the National Council; 1912/1913	Succeeded by Alfred von Planta
