= Karl Emil Wild =

Swiss politician and architect (1856–1923)

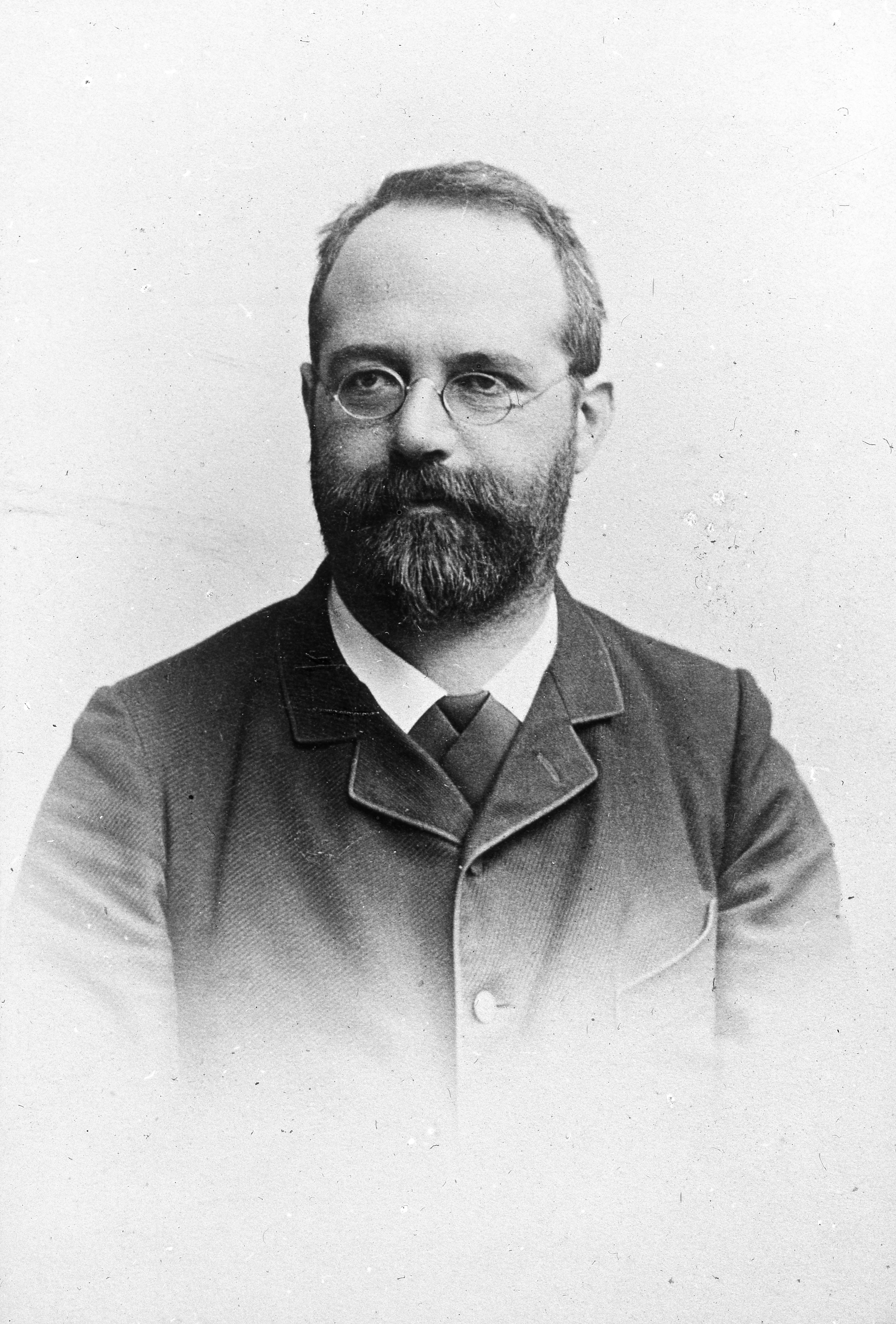
Karl Emil Wild (ca. 1900)

Karl Emil Wild (27 June 1856 – 17 February 1923) was a Swiss politician and architect from St. Gallen.

Wild was the son of the doctor Bernhard Wild and Wilhelmina Wild (née Brunner). In 1883 he married Clara Gsell. He studied architecture at the Technical University of Stuttgart from 1875 to 1878 and subsequently worked in Zurich and St. Gallen. Among other projects, he designed the municipal orphanage in St. Gallen.

From 1882 to 1923 Wild was the director of the St. Gallen Museum of Industry and Trade, which included an embroidery school and a drawing school. In 1886, the museum moved into the new building on Vadianstrasse (colloquially known as "Palazzo Rosso") planned by Gustav Gull and executed by Wild.

Wild also held office for the FDP as a cantonal councillor from 1891 to 1923 and as a national councillor from 1893 to 1919. In 1911/1912 he was President of the National Council. In the Federal Factory Commission he was an advocate of the eight-hour day. As president of the Central Association of the Embroidery Industry, he campaigned for better working conditions in the textile companies of eastern Switzerland and Vorarlberg.

In 1898 he was elected to the commission which was entrusted by the canton with the establishment of an academy for trade, commerce and administration. He was thus one of the co-founders of today's University of St.Gallen (HSG) and was appointed the first director of the academy (1899-1903). He himself never belonged to the teaching staff, but gave several public lectures on textile economics.

Preceded by Joseph Kuntschen	President of the National Council; 1911/1912	Succeeded by Carl Spahn
