= Otto Hunziker =

Swiss politician (1879–1940)

Otto Hunziker (6 May 1879, Aarau – 7 February 1940) was a Swiss politician and writer. Hunziker was the President of Canton Aargau and member of the National Council
