= Selina Chönz =

Swiss children's author

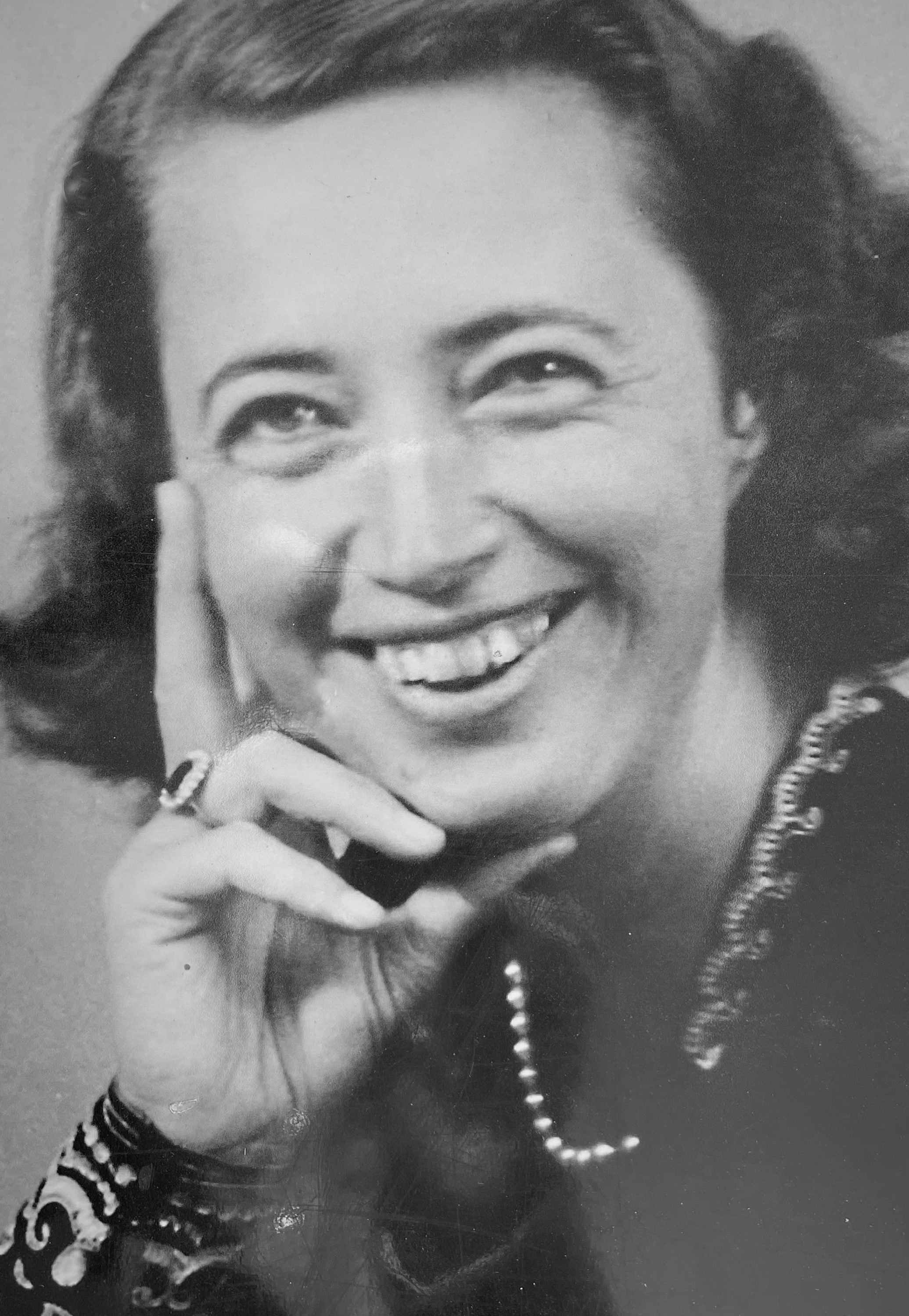
- Born: 4 August 1910; Samedan, Switzerland
- Died: 17 February 2000 (aged 89); Samedan, Switzerland

Selina Chönz or Selina Choenz (4 August 1910 – 17 February 2000) was a Swiss children's author. Her most famous work is A Bell for Ursli, a children's book illustrated by Alois Carigiet.

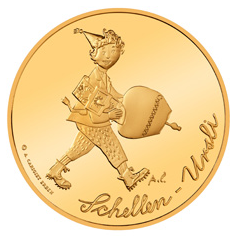
Swiss commemorative coin 2011

== Biography ==
Selina Chönz was born in Samedan on 4 August 1910 as the oldest child and the only daughter to printer and typesetter Anton M. Meyer from Hof and his wife, Marie Louise Ronzi. Chönz trained as a Montessori kindergarten teacher in Bern. She then spent time learning languages by moving to Spain, England and Italy. Her first teaching position was in Zuoz in the Engadin. Shortly after she moved to Zürich to teach kindergarten teachers. While there she decided to write a children's book herself.

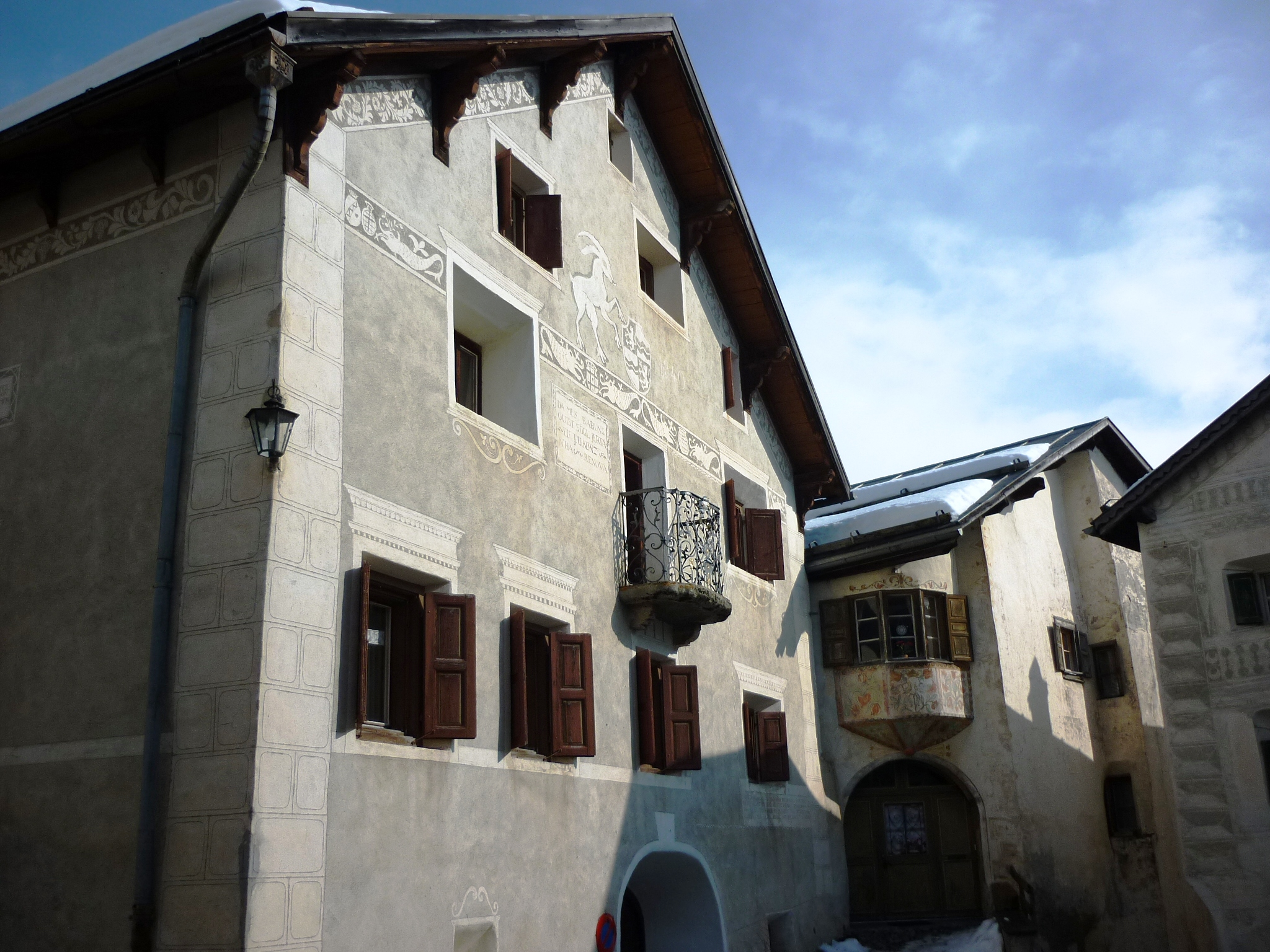
Chönz house, Guarda 47

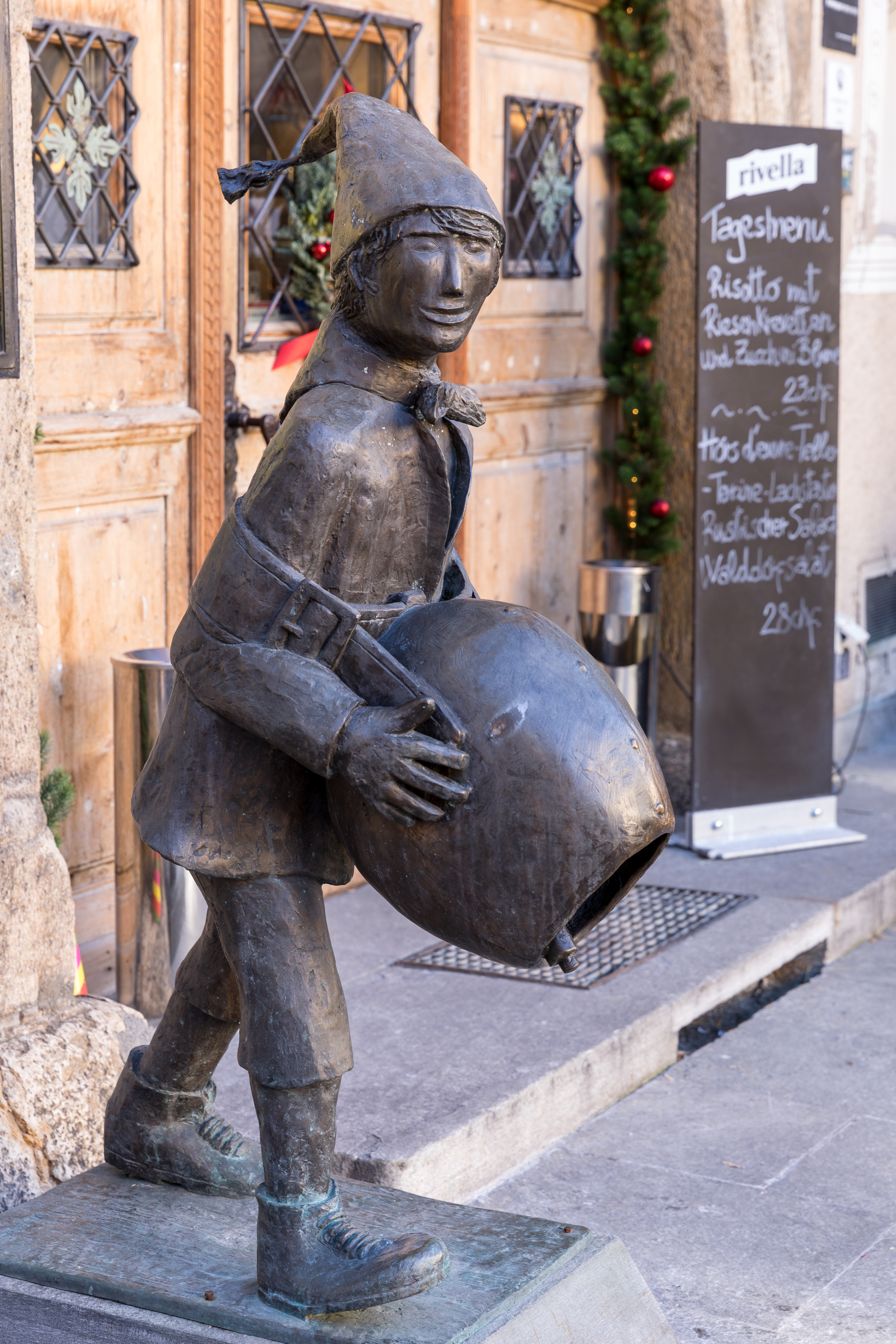
A Bell for Ursli sculpture in Zuoz

Chönz was a proponent of Romansh. When she married, she changed the spelling of her name to replace the German "K" with the "Ch". She wrote the original version of the A Bell for Ursli in Upper Engadin Romansh. She persuaded artist Alois Carigiet to be her illustrator. From 1940 to 1945 he visited Guarda, Switzerland and created the illustrations. He used the nearby houses Chasa 51 as the template for the Ursli house in the book.

Several further stories followed and the books were translated into a number of languages. She was awarded the Hans Christian Andersen Prize.

== Personal life ==
In 1939 she married the architect Iachen Ulrich Könz who already had four sons from his previous marriage. Together they had a son, painter and draftsman Steivan Liun Könz. Chönz lived in Guarda until 1981. She suffered from senile dementia towards the end of her life dying in 2000.

== Bibliography ==
Tales

- La chastlauna (1940)
- Il purtret da l'antenat (1943)
- La scuvierta da l'orma. Novel volume (1950)

Children's Books

- A bell for Ursli, (1945) Illustrated by Alois Carigiet.
- Florina and the wild bird, (1952) Illustrated by Alois Carigiet.
- The snowstorm, (1957) Illustrated by Alois Carigiet.
