= Society for Art History in Switzerland =

Swiss learned society

The Society for Art History in Switzerland (German: Gesellschaft für Schweizerische Kunstgeschichte (GSK), French: Société d'histoire de l'art en Suisse (SHAS), Italian: Società di storia dell' arte in Svizzera (SSAS)) is a Swiss learned society dedicated to promoting the understanding of Swiss art history and particularly of Swiss topography of art, including the study and maintenance of Swiss cultural heritage sites. The society, founded in 1880, publishes a wide range of monographs, guides, and inventories. These include the series Art monuments of Switzerland (German: Kunstdenkmäler der Schweiz, French: Monuments d'art et d'histoire de la Suisse), which includes more than one hundred volumes, the first of which was published in 1927. It also publishes the quarterly journal Kunst und Architektur in der Schweiz.

== History ==
=== Founding ===
The society was founded on June 20, 1880 in Zofingen as the Patriotic Society for the Preservation of Historic Monuments (German: Vaterländische Gesellschaft für Erhaltung historischer Denkmäler). Its creation was due to members of the Schweizerischer Kunstverein (Swiss Society of Fine Arts), and its first president was the Genevan painter Theodore de Saussure. The vice-presidency was held by the Zurich art historian Johann Rudolf Rahn. The society had as its aim to preserve and restore architectural monuments, to save scattered works of art by bringing them together in museums, to arouse a better understanding of and appreciation for the fine arts, and to support artists, painters, and sculptors. In the statutes adopted at the meeting of the founding committee, the name of the society was altered to Association for the Preservation of Artistic Monuments of the Fatherland (German: Verein für Erhaltung vaterländischer Kunstdenkmäler). The regulations stipulated that the money received by the society must be divided into two equal shares, where the first was to be used to finance publications and the other to buy works of art and old objects of value. This second part of the fund was also allocated for the restoration of historic monuments that were at risk of being destroyed or falling into ruin.

The association changed its name again at the general meeting in Lausanne in 1881 to become the Swiss Society for the Preservation of Historic Art Monuments (German: Schweizerische Gesellschaft für Erhaltung historischer Kunstdenkmäler). It shifted its stance towards buying items and buildings of national importance, though it still kept publishing various works. A brief treatise on the reliquary cross of Engelberg (from the end of the 12th or beginning of the 13th century) appeared in 1881 written by Rahn. Rahn also wrote a description of the stained glass window dating from 1530 in the Reformed Church of St. Saphorin (Vaud) and an article on the Casa Borrani (or Serodine) in Ascona with its baroque façade. In 1934, the society changed its name for the last time, taking its current name of the Society for Art History in Switzerland.

At the general meeting in 1882, a request was made to set up an inventory of buildings requiring preservation or restoration works and of objets d'art which were at risk of being destroyed or sold.

In March 1884, the Federal Department of the Interior responded to a motion on the subject of the creation of a Swiss National Museum and entrusted the society with the acquisition of a certain number of objects of its choice, but the ownership of which would revert to the Confederation. In the implementing ordinance of February 25, 1887, a Federal Commission for the Preservation of Antiquities of Switzerland was created and its competences and duties were passed to the committee of the society. In the same year, the statutes of the society were adapted to its new function.

=== Creation of Swiss National Museum ===
In 1891, the Federal Council (Swiss Government) founded the Swiss National Museum with its head office in Zurich and the purchase of antiquities then no longer was a duty of the society. This decision was confirmed on March 12, 1892. The society continued its inventory, preservation, and restoration work on historic works of art and excavations. In 1896, Karl Stehlin, then President of the society, was called on to take charge of a new subsidiary research commission relating to the Roman period. Josef Zemp, a later president, and Albert Naef, who took over the presidency from Zemp, pleaded for equality of treatment of the different old styles, rejecting any organization of the periods into a hierarchy. They attached great importance to as complete a job of preservation as possible of the authentic work and a distinction between what was original and what was reconstructed, in order to avoid any pastiche.

Starting from 1899, the Directory of Swiss Antiquities (German: Anzeiger für schweizerische Altertumskunde), published by the Swiss National Museum, served as the official organ of the society, complemented from 1901 on by the publication of the society's Communications in two editions, German and French. The first issue of this series was devoted to the stained-glass windows of the chancel of the church in Oberkirch near Frauenfeld and the Weinmarkt (wine market) fountain in Lucerne, with texts by Rahn and Zemp. In 1900, Paul Ganz suggested the establishment of a directory with photographs of old stained-glass windows in Switzerland, as well as working drawings and designs of stained-glass windows. Appointed director of the Kunstmuseum Basel, he succeeded in building up a small collection by 1902 which became the starting point of the Archives of the History of Art in Switzerland (German: Archiv für schweizerische Kunstgeschichte). Rahn also began to create an inventory of Switzerland's art and history monuments. The state archivist Robert Durrer later edited the statistics of the monuments of Obwalden and Nidwalden, published in a supplement to the Directory and reprinted in 1971.

=== Creation of Federal Commission of Historic Monuments ===
In 1915, the Department of the Interior created a Federal Commission of Historic Monuments (German: Eidgenössische Kommission für Denkmalpflege) and the society's activity in the field of the preservation of monuments also came to an end. Funds of 2000 francs (later 3000) for small restoration works were granted to the society as a consolation. These funds were paid until 1960. Having thus been successively relieved of two essential tasks, the society devoted itself from then on to the publication of works.

== Major publications ==
In 1920, under the presidency of the Genevan architect Camille Martin, the scholarly inventory of Switzerland's art and history monuments was able to commence. Samuel Guyer undertook the architectural inventory of the canton of Zurich and Linus Birchler (the first president of the Federal Commission of Historic Monuments) that of the cantons of Schwyz and Uri. The society's committee submitted a request for grants to the federal authorities and drew up rules in 1924 to determine the organization of these far-reaching works. In 1925, in agreement with the Department of the Interior and various scholarly associations, the society undertook the publication of the national inventory of the Monuments of Art and History of Switzerland (German: Inventar der Kunstdenkmäler der Schweiz) in close collaboration with the cantons. The first volume, written by Birchler and devoted to three districts of the canton of Schwyz, Einsiedeln, March and Höfe, appeared in 1927.

Since then, more than 120 volumes of this collection have been published. They were complemented between 1982 and 2004 by the Swiss Inventory of Architecture (German: Inventar der neueren Schweizer Architektur, 1850-1920 INSA), a collection of eleven volumes. The society also publishes the Guides to Swiss Monuments (German: Schweizerischer Kunstführer), a series launched in 1935 by Paul Ganz, of regional or cantonal guides, which are special issues touching on specific subjects linked to the history of art and architecture. It also publishes a quarterly review, Art + Architecture in Switzerland (German: Kunst+Architektur in der Schweiz).

== Presidents ==
- Theodore de Saussare
- Julius Kunkler (1888–1895)
- Karl Stehlin (1895–1898)
- Josef Zemp (1898–1904)
- Albert Naef (1904–1915)
- Josef Zemp (1915–1916)
- Camille Martin (1916–1922)
