= Giarsun =

Coordinates: 46.7699°N 10.1445°E

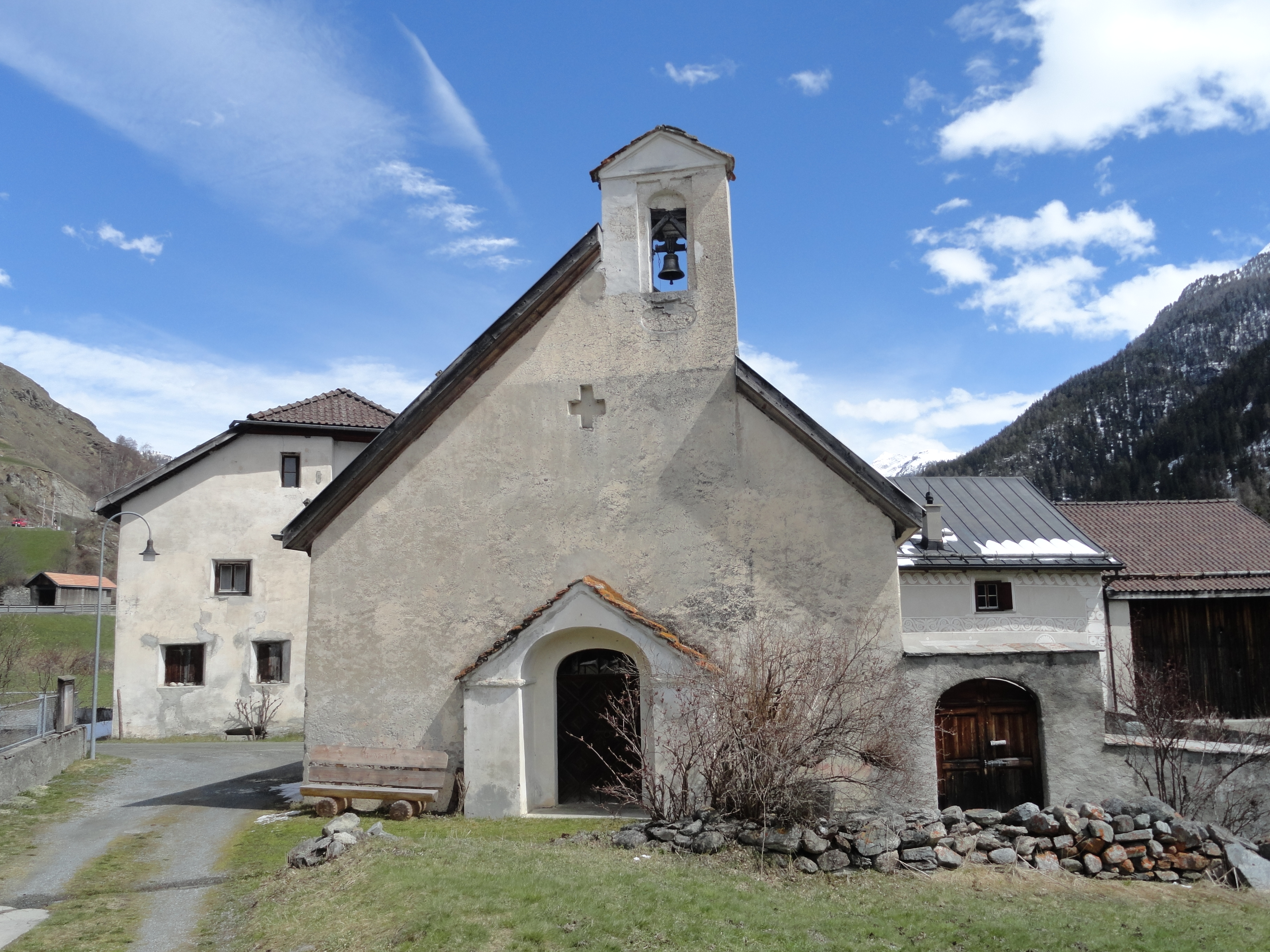
Local church

Giarsun ([dʑɐrˈzʊn]) is an Alpine village in the Lower Engadin valley in the Graubünden canton in Switzerland.
